= Paiser Meul, Peize =

Windmill in Peize, Netherlands

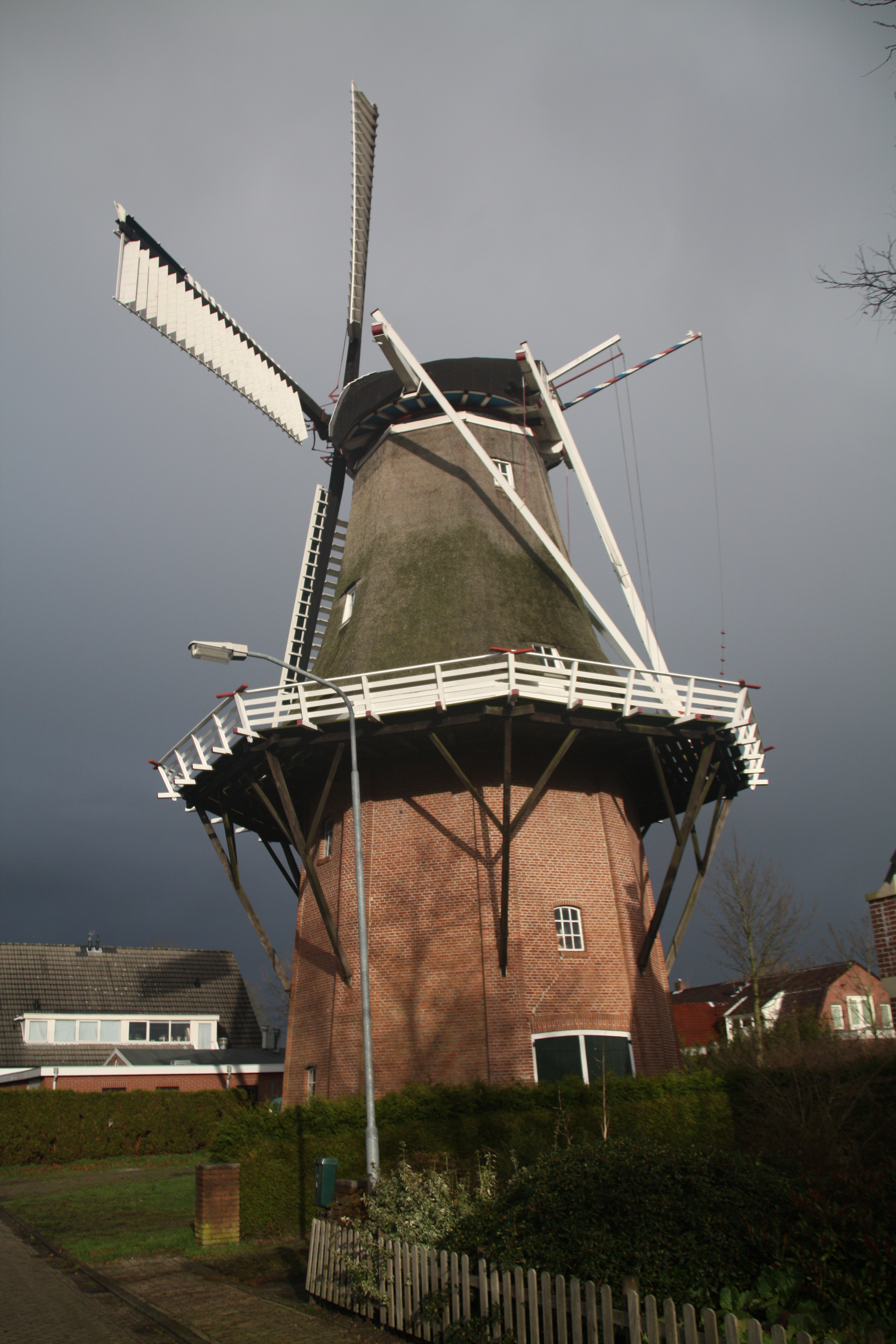
- Paiser Meul, December 2008
- Interactive map of Paiser Meul, Peize

Origin
- Mill name: Paiser Meul
- Mill location: Molenpad 1, 9321 CA, Peize
- Coordinates: 53°08′54″N 6°29′32″E
- Operator: Gemeente Noordenveld
- Year built: 1898

Information
- Purpose: Corn mill
- Type: Smock mill
- Storeys: Two-storey smock
- Base storeys: Four-storey base
- Smock sides: Eight sides
- No. of sails: Four sails
- Type of sails: Patent sails
- Windshaft: Cast iron
- Winding: Tailpole and winch
- No. of pairs of millstones: Two pairs
- Size of millstones: 1.50 metres (4 ft 11 in) diameter each

Paiser Meul is a smock mill in Peize, Drenthe, the Netherlands. It was built in 1898 and is listed as a Rijksmonument, number 32145.

== History ==
Paiser Meul was originally built in 1845 at Enumatil, Groningen. It was dismantled in 1890. In 1898, the mill was re-erected at Peize by millwright Christiaan Bremer of Adorp, Groningen for F Staal. The mill was built with Patent Sails and the smock and cap were clad in Dakleer. In 1936, Bremer fitted the sails with Dekkerised leading edges. In that year the mill was sold to De Goede Verwachting Coöperatie. The stage was renewed in 1961 and in 1967 the mill was sold to the Gemeente Peize. The mill was restored in 1971–72 by millwright Alserda of Doezum, Groningen. The Patent sails were replaced with Common sails and the smock was thatched. In 1980, new patent sails were fitted by millwright Doornbosch of Adorp, Groningen. They were renewed in 1990, again by Doornbosch.

== Description ==
Paiser Meul is what the Dutch describe as an "achtkante stellingmolen". It is a two-storey smock mill on a four-storey brick base. The stage is at third-floor level, 8.90 metres (29 ft 2 in) above ground level. The smock is thatched. The mill is winded by a tailpole and winch. The four Patent sails have a span of 21.40 metres (70 ft 3 in) are carried in a cast-iron windshaft, which was cast by Koning. The windshaft also carries the brake wheel, which has 65 cogs. The brake wheel drives the wallower (42 cogs) at the top of the upright shaft. At the bottom of the upright shaft the great spur wheel, which has 103 cogs, drives the 1.50 metres (4 ft 11 in) diameter Cullen millstones and 1.50 metres (4 ft 11 in) diameter French Burr millstones via lantern pinion stone nuts which have 24 staves each.

== Public access ==
Paiser Meul is open on Wednesdays and Saturdays from 13:30 to 17:00 and at other times by appointment.
