= Gert Ligterink =

Dutch chess player (born 1949)

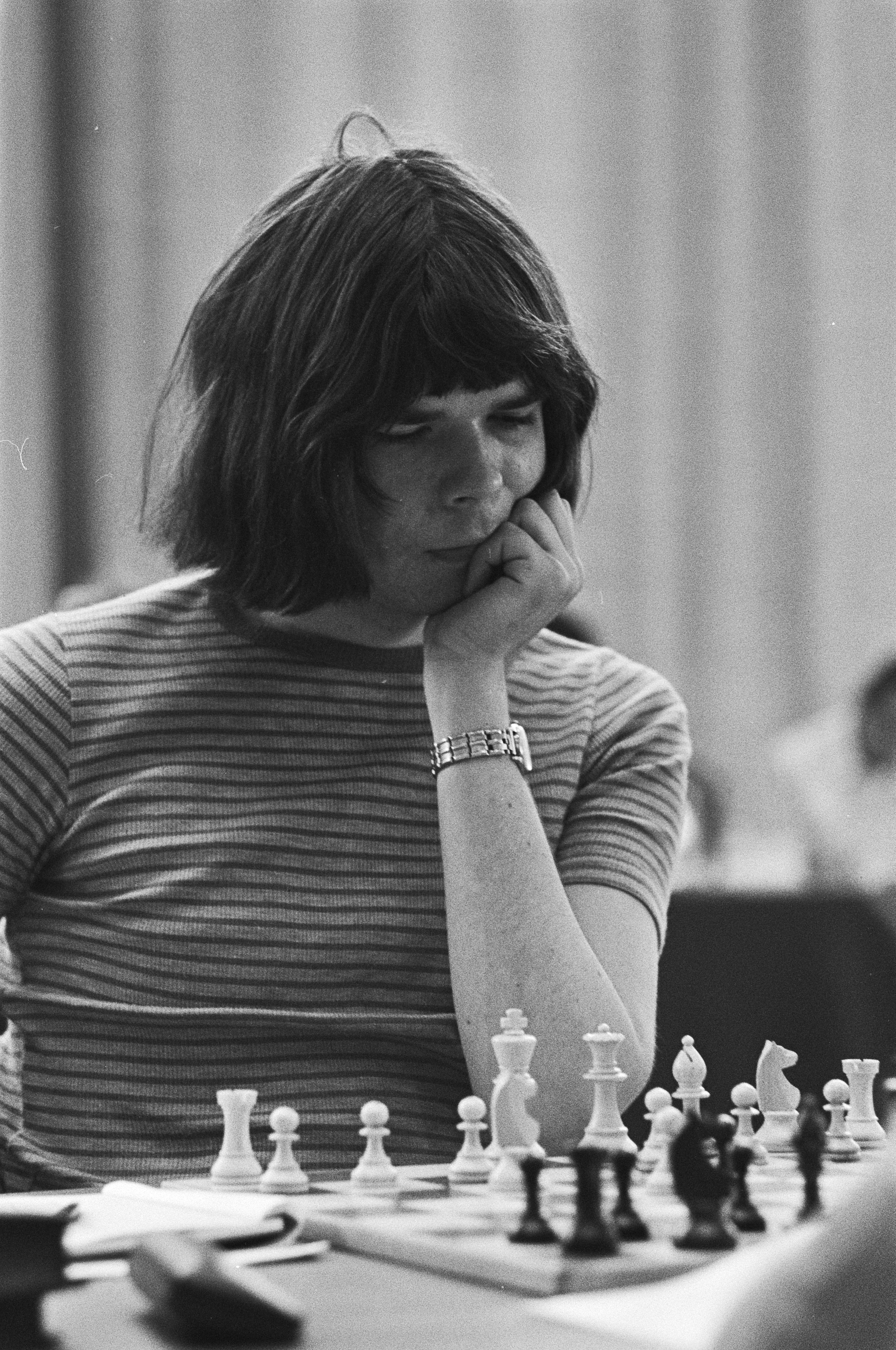

Personal information
- Born: November 17, 1949 (age 76) Oldekerk, Netherlands

Chess career
- Country: Netherlands
- Title: International Master (1977)
- FIDE rating: 2403 (July 2026)
- Peak rating: 2470 (January 1986)

Gert Ligterink (born 17 November 1949 in Oldekerk) is a Dutch chess player. He was awarded the International Master title in 1977 and won the Dutch Chess Championship in 1979. He played for the Netherlands in the Chess Olympiads of 1976 (individual bronze medal), 1978, 1980 and 1982 and in the European Team Chess Championship of 1983 (individual silver medal).

Ligterink wrote the chess column for Tata Steel Chess from 2003 to 2011.
