= Enumatil =

Enumatil Aimtil / IJmentil (Gronings)
- Village
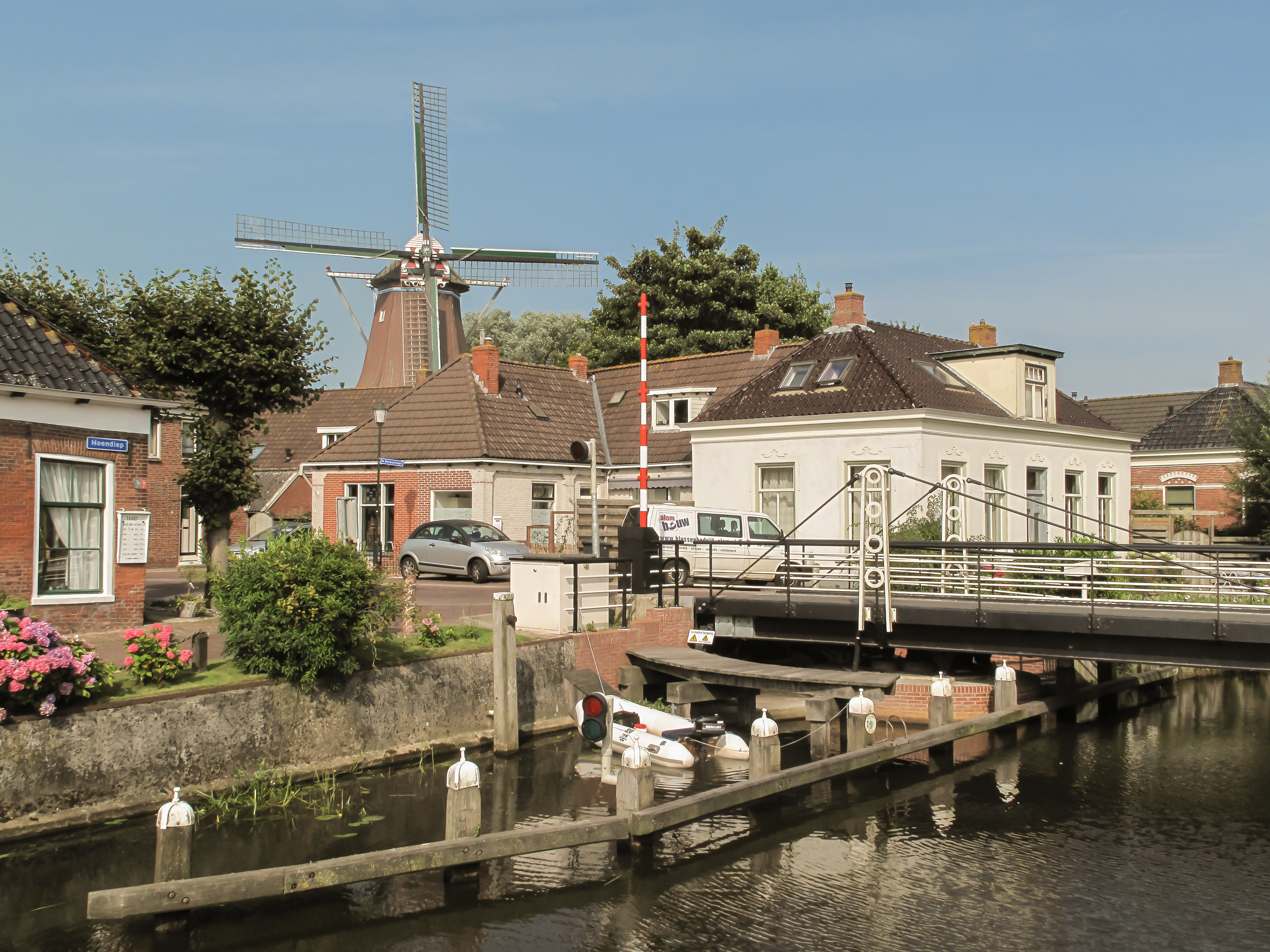
- Flour mill Eben Haëzer in street view of Enumatil

- Location in the province of Groningen in the Netherlands Enumatil (Netherlands)
- Coordinates: 53°13′N 6°25′E
- Country: Netherlands
- Province: Groningen
- Municipality: Westerkwartier

Area
  - Total: 3.36 km^{2} (1.30 sq mi)
- Elevation: 0.7 m (2.3 ft)

Population (2021)
  - Total: 335
  - Density: 99.7/km^{2} (258/sq mi)
- Time zone: UTC+1 (CET)
  - Summer (DST): UTC+2 (CEST)
- Postcode: 9811-9812
- Area code: 0594

Enumatil (Dutch: [ˈeːnymaːtɪl]; Gronings: Aimtil or IJmentil) is a village in the municipality of Westerkwartier in the province of Groningen in the Netherlands. As of 2021, it had a population of 335. It is located to the south of Briltil and to the west of Den Horn.

== Geography ==
Just south of the village, the Lettelberterdiep and the Enumatilster Matsloot flow into the Hoendiep. The last part of the current Matsloot from the Eerste Brug towards the Hoendiep was built around 1818. Previously, this last stretch ran from the Tweede Brug to the north side of the village and connected to the Hoendiep.

The village owns three bridges over the Matsloot, called the Eerste ('First') and the Tweede Brug ('Second Bridge'). The third bridge, known as the Auwemadraai, is located just outside the village on the road to Leek. This bridge was completely renovated in 2009.

The corn mill Eben Haëzer is located in the middle of the village. Southeast of Enumatil is the American wind engine Enumatil.

== History ==
The name Enumatil comes from the bridge (til) of Enuma (Enema, Eme; a family name) built around 1445. The village had its own chapel around 1500. In 1582, the Spaniards built a defensive rampart around Enumatil to protect the shipping route to and from the pro-Spanish city of Groningen.

The municipal boundary between the former municipalities of Leek, Zuidhorn, and Oldekerk (part of the municipality of Grootegast since 1990) ran right through the village before the municipal reorganization of 1985, so that Enumatil was in three different municipalities. This boundary was changed in such a way that the village came to lie almost completely in Leek. As of January 1, 2019, all these municipalities have been merged into the municipality of Westerkwartier.

== Gallery ==
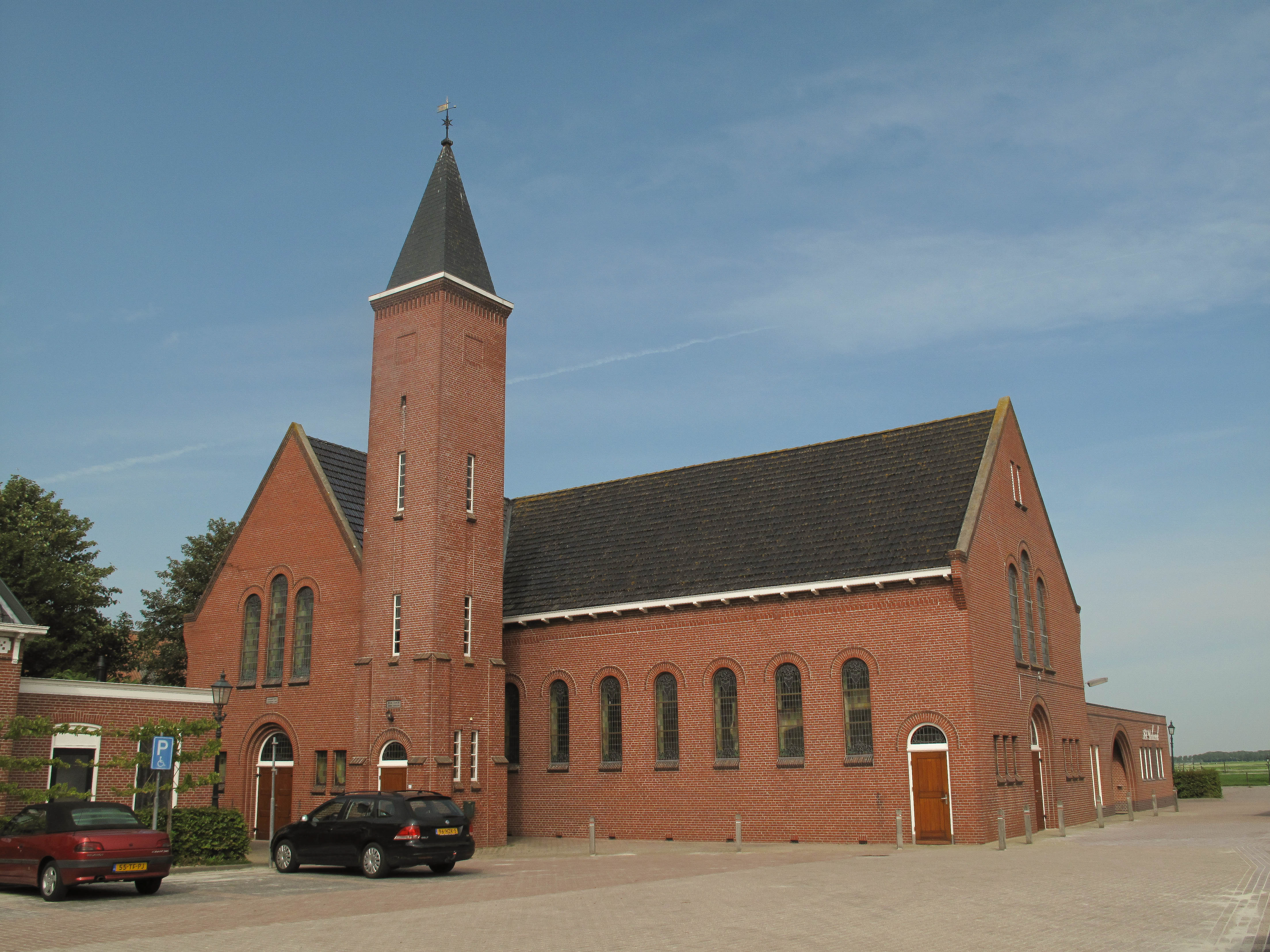
Reformed Church (Liberated) of Enumatil

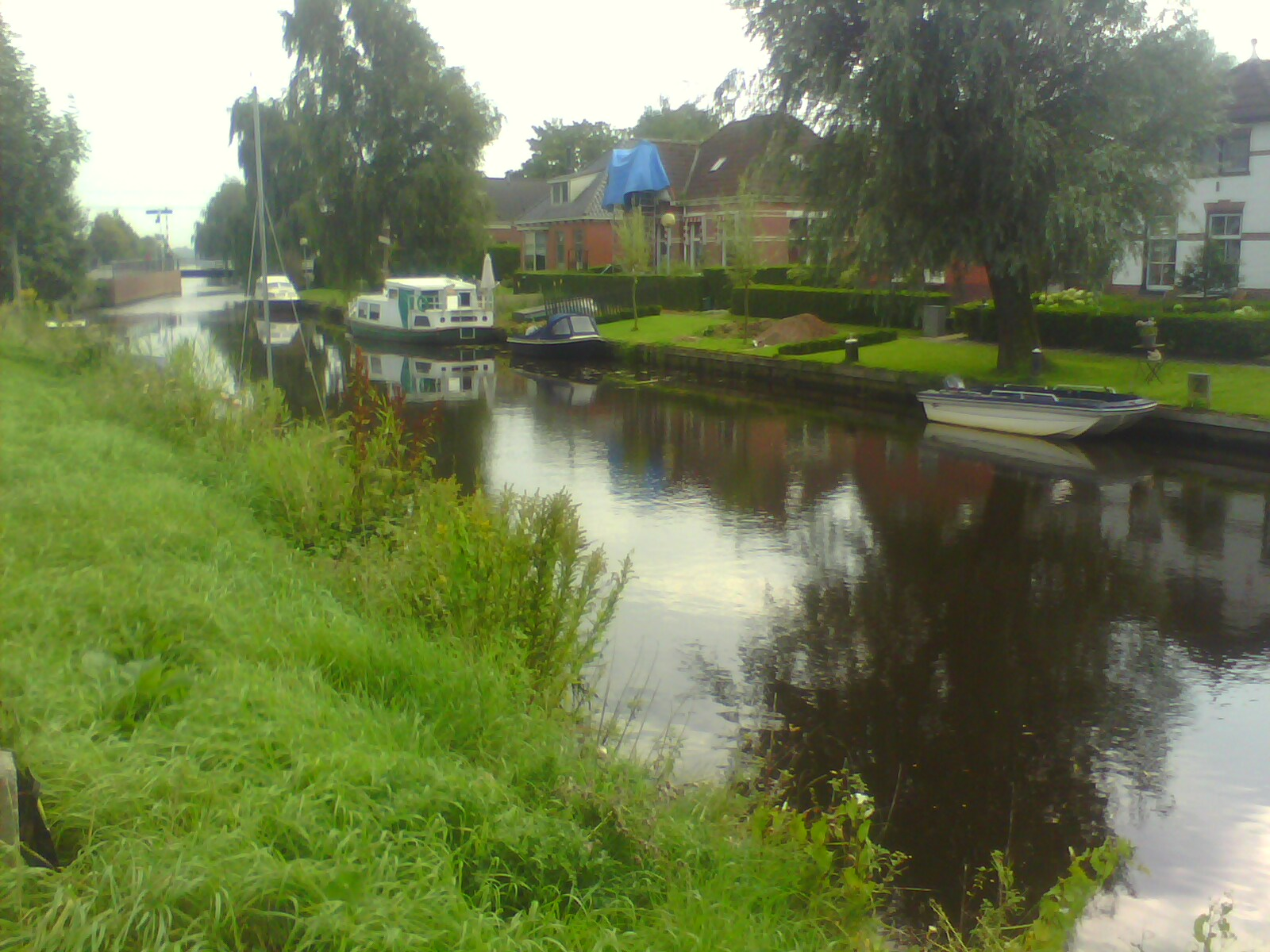
View of the Hoendiep

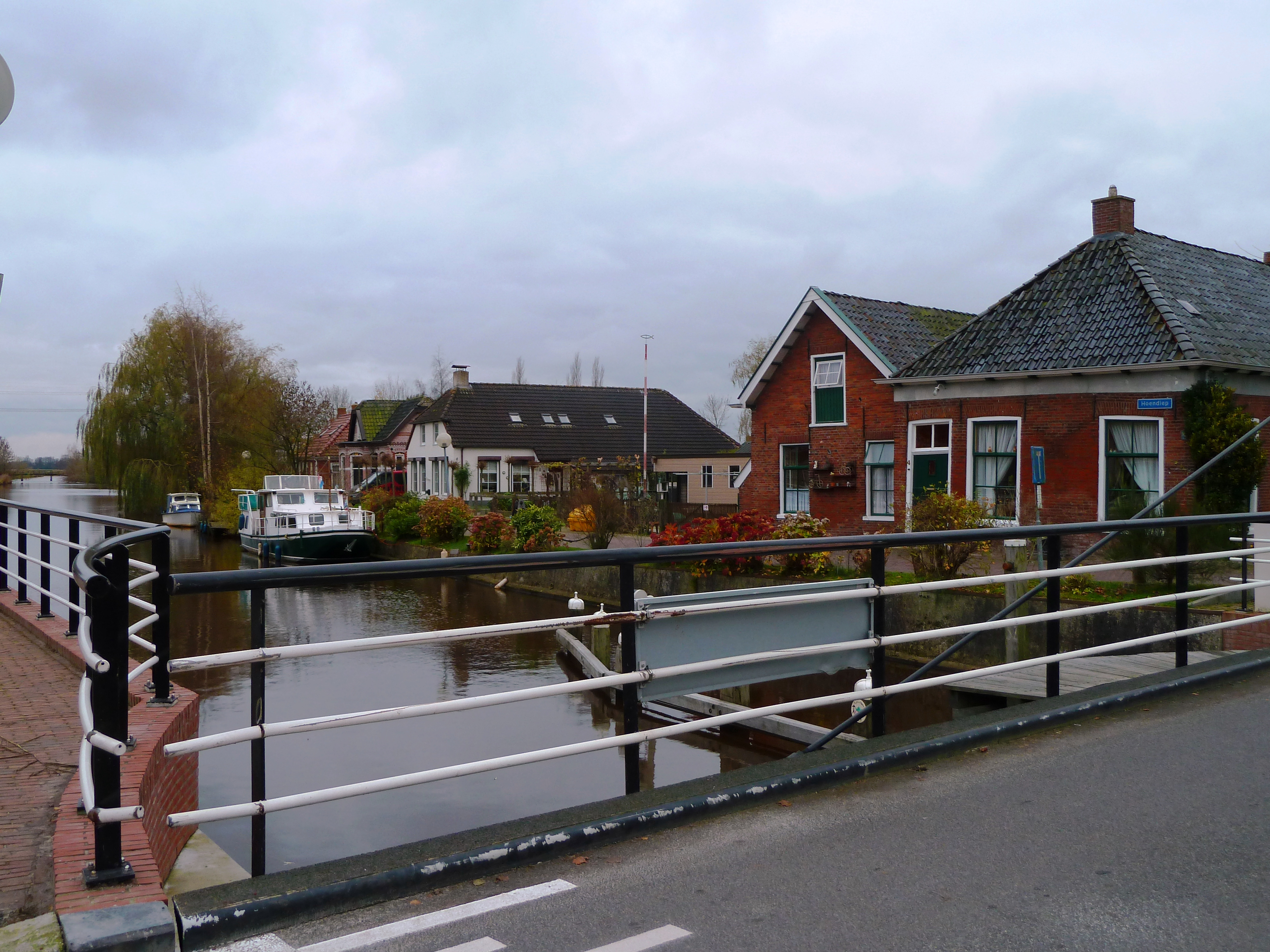
View from the swing bridge

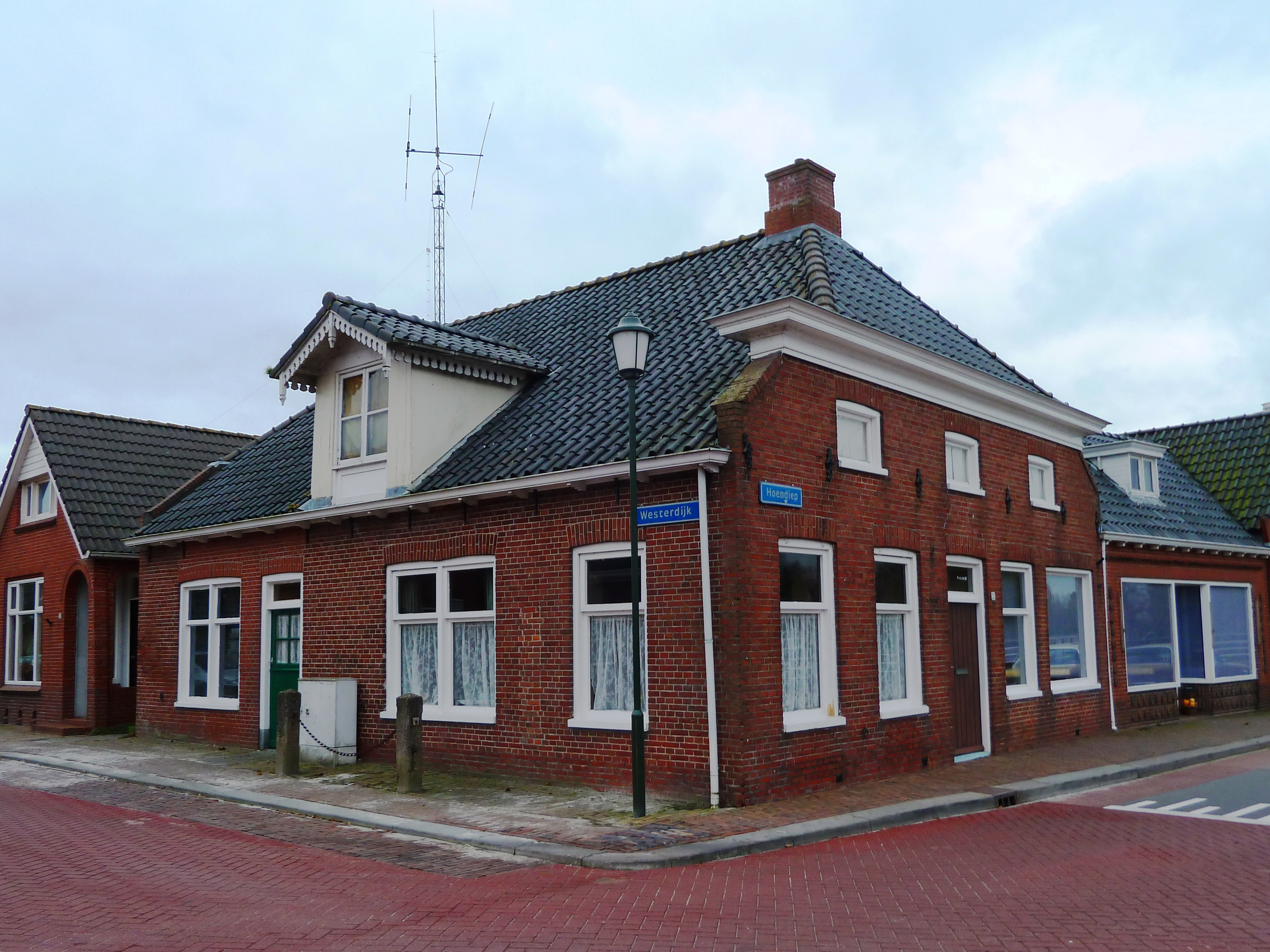
Former café Otter
