= Grootegast =

- Village, former municipality
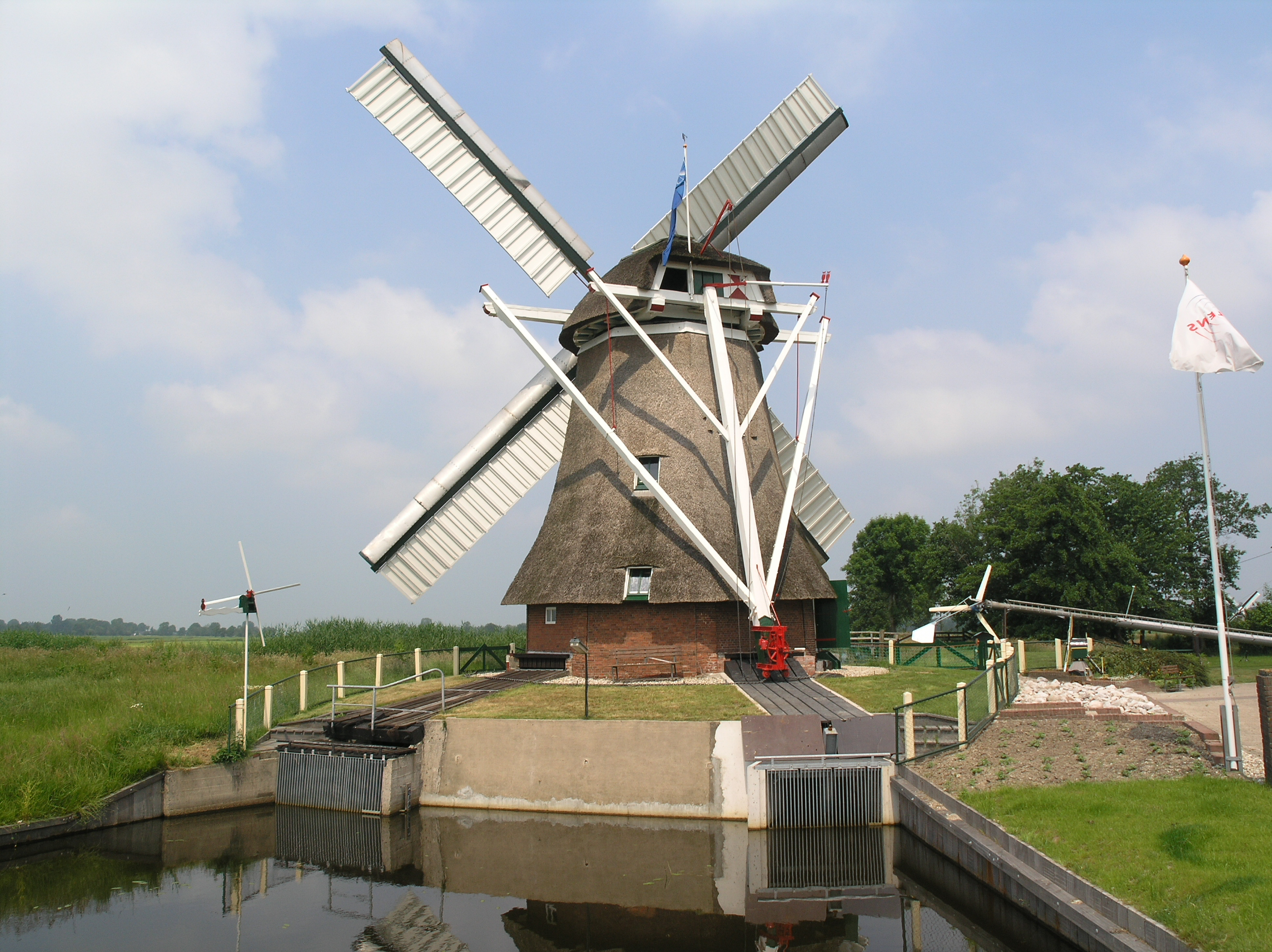
- Wind mill in Sebaldeburen

- Flag Coat of arms

- Location in Groningen
- Coordinates: 53°13′N 6°17′E
- Country: Netherlands
- Province: Groningen
- Municipality: Westerkwartier

Area
  - Total: 31.27 km^{2} (12.07 sq mi)
- Elevation: 2 m (6.6 ft)

Population (2021)
  - Total: 3,350
  - Density: 107/km^{2} (277/sq mi)
- Time zone: UTC+1 (CET)
  - Summer (DST): UTC+2 (CEST)
- Postcode: 9820–9823, 9860–9869
- Area code: 0594

Grootegast (Dutch pronunciation: [ˈɣroːtəˌɣɑst]; Gronings: Grodegast; West Frisian: Gruttegast) is a village and former municipality in the northeastern Netherlands. It is the sister city of Kingston, Tasmania. The municipality was merged into the municipality of Westerkwartier on 1 January 2019.

== Geography ==
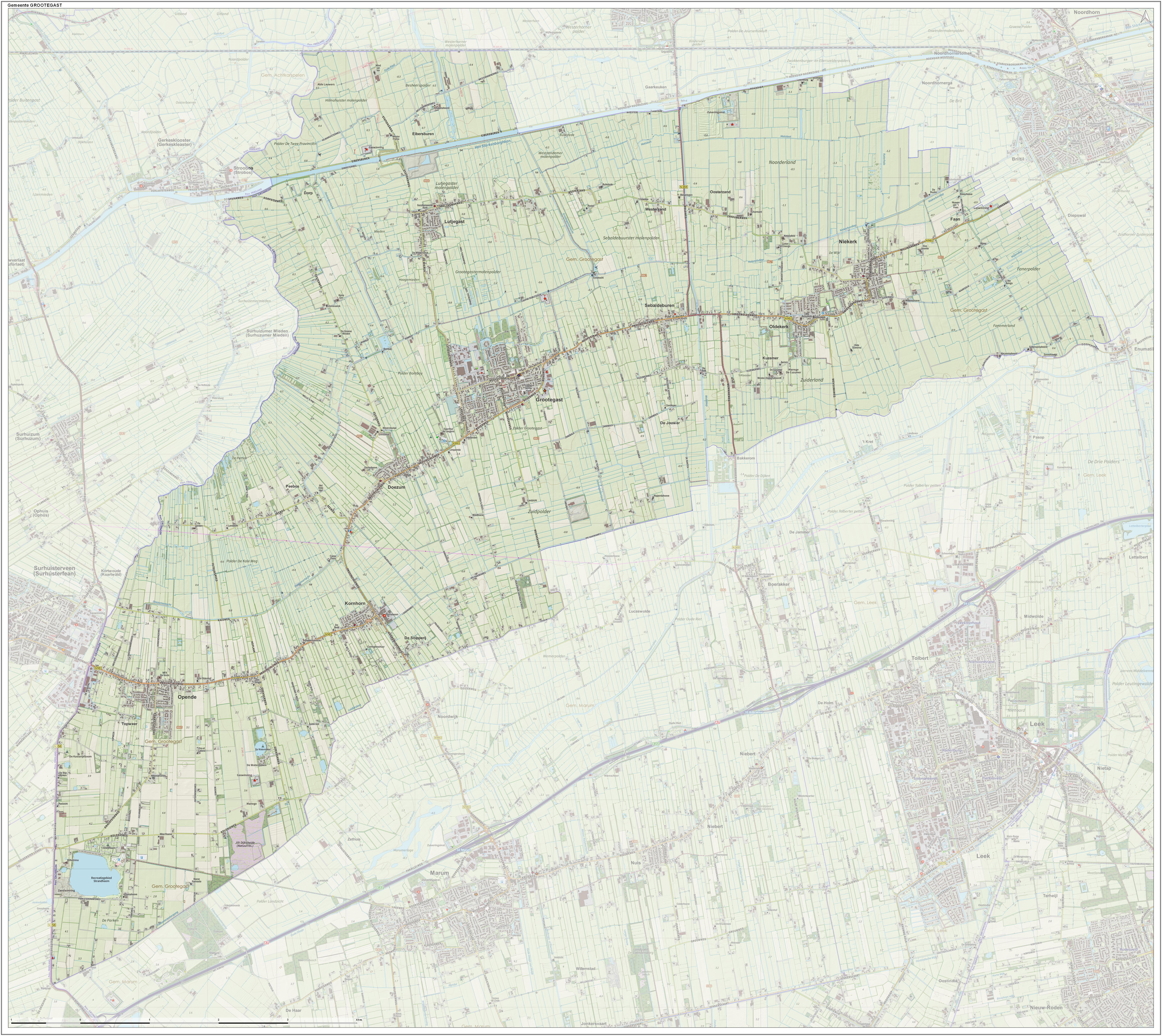
Municipality of Grootegast, June 2015

The former municipality contained the population centres: Doezum, Enumatil, Faan, Grootegast, Kornhorn, Lutjegast, Niekerk, Oldekerk, Opende, Sebaldeburen. In some of these villages, they still speak the West Frisian language.

== History ==
The village originated around the year 1000 (as Majorgast) and was profiled from 1400 onwards as the counterpart of Lutjegast. The village contains a 17th-century church, the so-called Witte Kerkje ('Little White Church'). This church was restored in 1829.

Grootegast was the main village of the former municipality. The name of the village refers to a gast or gaast, a higher, sandy ridge in an otherwise swampy area. Groot is Dutch for 'large'.

== Dialect ==
The Grootegasters dialect, or Westerkwartiers, is clearly a borderline case. Linguistically, the influences of three provinces are noticeable: the dialect is a variant of Gronings, but in terms of intelligibility it is more like Drents; however, the accent and grammar sound rather Frisian, which can be explained by the fact that almost all of Lutjegast still spoke Frisian 100 years ago. Being a border village of Lutjegast, Frisian influence is still noticeable today in the number of villagers of Frisian origin and the many business and social contacts with Friesland.

== Notable people ==
- Cornelius Van Til (1895–1987), theologian
- Ron Groenewoud (1937), football player
