= Kornhorn =

- Village
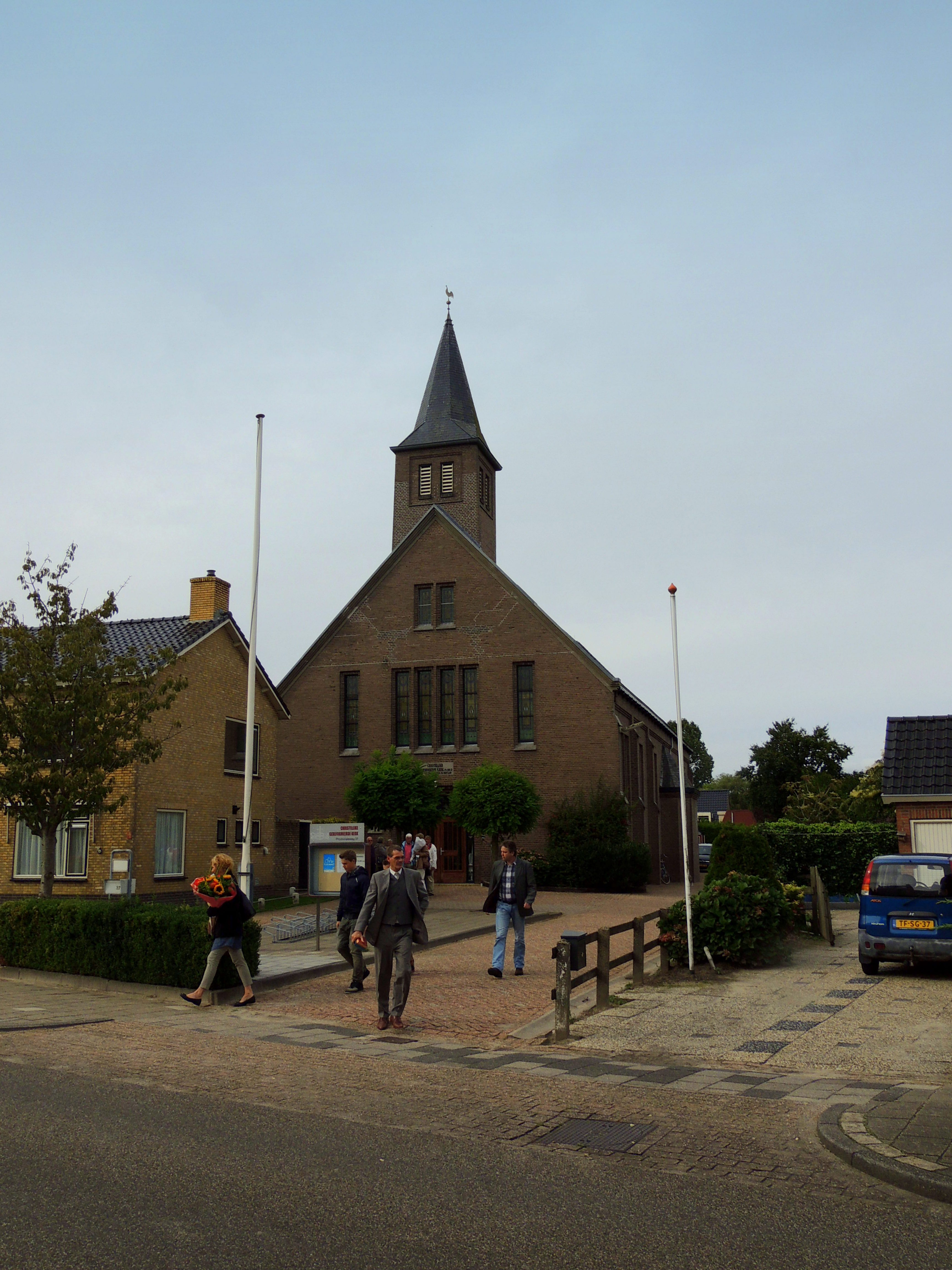
- Kornhorn church

- Location of the village in the province of Groningen Kornhorn (Netherlands)
- Coordinates: 53°11′N 6°15′E
- Country: Netherlands
- Province: Groningen
- Municipality: Westerkwartier

Area
  - Total: 0.49 km^{2} (0.19 sq mi)
- Elevation: 2 m (6.6 ft)

Population (2021)
  - Total: 495
  - Density: 1,000/km^{2} (2,600/sq mi)
- Time zone: UTC+1 (CET)
  - Summer (DST): UTC+2 (CEST)
- Postal code: 9864
- Dialing code: 0594

Kornhorn (Dutch pronunciation: [ˈkɔrnɦɔrn]) is a village in Westerkwartier municipality in the Dutch province of Groningen. It had a population of around 495 in 2021.

== Overview ==
Kornhorn is situated along a dike in a raised bog. It was first mentioned in 1596 as Corriger sandt. The current name means the people of Corre/Curre near the bend (of the dike). (See also: Koarnjum). In 1840, the hamlet was home to 61 people, and considered part of Doezum. In 1930, it received the status of a village. In the 1940s, a disagreement to which parish Kornhorn belonged, resulted in a schism and the establishment of three churches. In 2017, one of the churches dissolved. In 2018, it became part of the municipality Westerkwartier.

== Notable people ==
- IJje Wijkstra (1895–1941), murderer about whom the film The Mark of the Beast was made
