= Hoendiep =

Canal in the Netherlands

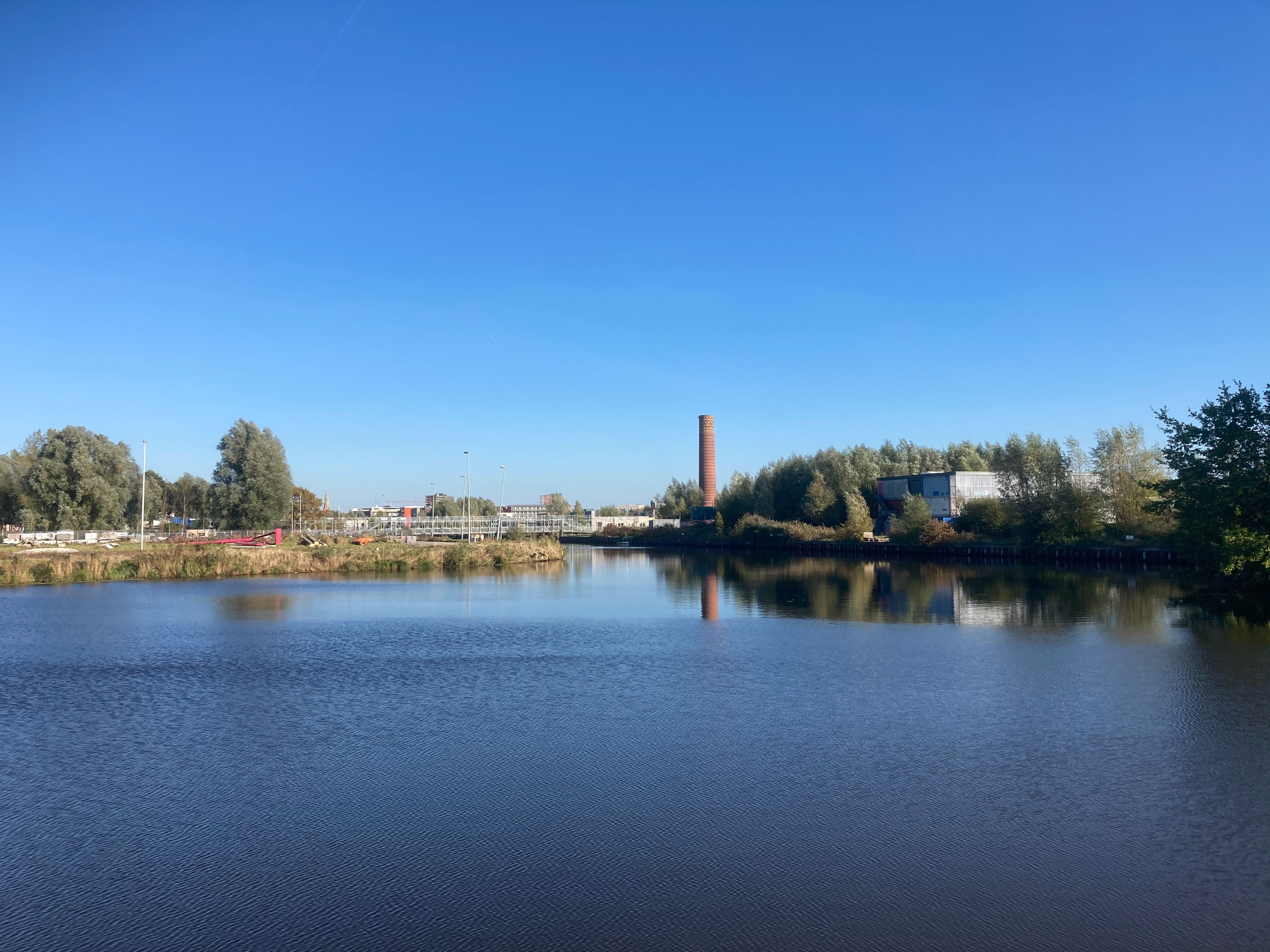
- The Hoendiep in Groningen

- Location within Groningen (province)
- Interactive map of Hoendiep
- Location: Groningen
- Country: Netherlands

Specifications
- Length: 15 km (9.3 miles)

History
- Date of first use: 1616

Geography
- Start point: Groningen
- End point: Noordhornerga
- Beginning coordinates: 53.2143°N 6.5524°E
- Ending coordinates: 53.2533°N 6.3787°E

The Hoendiep (Dutch: [ˈɦundip]; Gronings: Houndaip) is a canal in the Dutch province of Groningen, located between the city of Groningen and Zuidhorn. Before 1949, the section of the Van Starkenborgh Canal from Zuidhorn to the Frisian border was also called Hoendiep. The road on the south side of the Van Starkenborgh Canal is still called Hoendiep.

The current canal is 15 km long. The settlements of Groningen, Hoogkerk, De Poffert, Enumatil, Zuidhorn and Briltil are located on the Hoendiep.

== Etymology ==
According to Moritz Schönfeld, the name Hoendiep refers to dirty, muddy water and is related to names such as Hoerediep, Honte and Hunze. The name may even be a corruption of Hunsinge, a decayed natural body of water that begins in almost the same place.

The similar name also occurs in, for example, Lower Saxony: the Hunte river. Furthermore, a gat south of the German island of Langeoog bears the name Hungat.

== History ==
The Hoendiep originally ran from a point west of the Groninger Aapoort to De Poffert. From there, to get to Friesland, sailors sailed via the Gave (now largely disappeared) to the Lettelberterdiep. They followed this canal to Briltil and from there went via the Niekerksterdiep and the Kolonelsdiep to the Burgumer Mar. The extension of the Hoendiep between Briltil and the Oude Riet is called the Stille Diep.

From 1654 to 1657, the Hoendiep was extended from Briltil via the Stille Diep to the north to Noordhornertolhek. From there they went west, along the current route of the Van Starkenborgh Canal, until it rejoined the Kolonelsdiep near Gerkesklooster. The canal was moved in or just before 1675. North of Oostwold, a connection was dug from De Poffert to the Lettelberterdiep (the current route De Poffert - Enumatil). The Gave near Oostwold lost its meaning and silted up. The new route made the connection approximately 2 km shorter. In the days of towing, this quickly meant a time saving of one hour.

In 1863, a connection was dug between the Hoendiep and the Hoornsediep south of the city. This went via the Westerhaven (part of the former city fortification moats). The Westerhaven Lock was constructed to manage the difference in water levels. Land traffic along the Westerhaven to Paterswolde, which had to cross the new connection, then used the Kroodersbrug.

From 1862 to 1870, the Hoendiep was improved. This facilitated an increase in traffic on the canal from 500,000t in 1878 to 1,250,000t in 1898. However, the maximum size of the barges on the canal remained only 120-140t.

To improve this winding shipping route though the city's inland ports, the Eendrachts Canal was put into use in 1909. This new canal circumvented the Westerhaven and the Hoendiep port, but did little to improve the overall situation. In fact, the situation worsened in the years leading up to World War I. Only a little bit west of the Eendrachts Canal, two new chokepoints were created. The first was the Vierverlaten sugar factory built in 1896. The other the Groningen sugar factory built in 1914. During the sugar beet campaign, these sugar factories attracted swarms of small barges that often queued up till right into the Westerhaven.

In 1899, a society was founded to improve the waterways of Groningen, 'in particular the Eems Canal and the waterway to Lemmer'. The society ordered an engineering firm to make a plan to improve the Hoendiep and its bottlenecks: the Westerhaven Lock, the Westerhaven, and the Hoendiep port. The local and national governments went along with this idea, but as the size of barges increased, the expected cost also rose. In the early 1920s, the plan for an overall upgrade of the Hoendiep was cancelled. This was primarily due to the cost of upgrading the Westerhaven Lock and the Hoendiep in Hoogkerk.

As an alternative, the Van Starkenborgh Canal was completed in 1937. The present Hoendiep has virtually lost its function for commercial shipping. The only part that is still used as such is a section near Vierverlaten, which can be reached via the Aduarderdiep. The same can be said of the section west of Noordhorn, which was renamed Van Starkenborgh Canal in 1949.

The Westerhaven and the part of the canal between this harbor and the Eendrachtskanaal were later filled in. The street name is still Hoendiep.

== Gallery ==
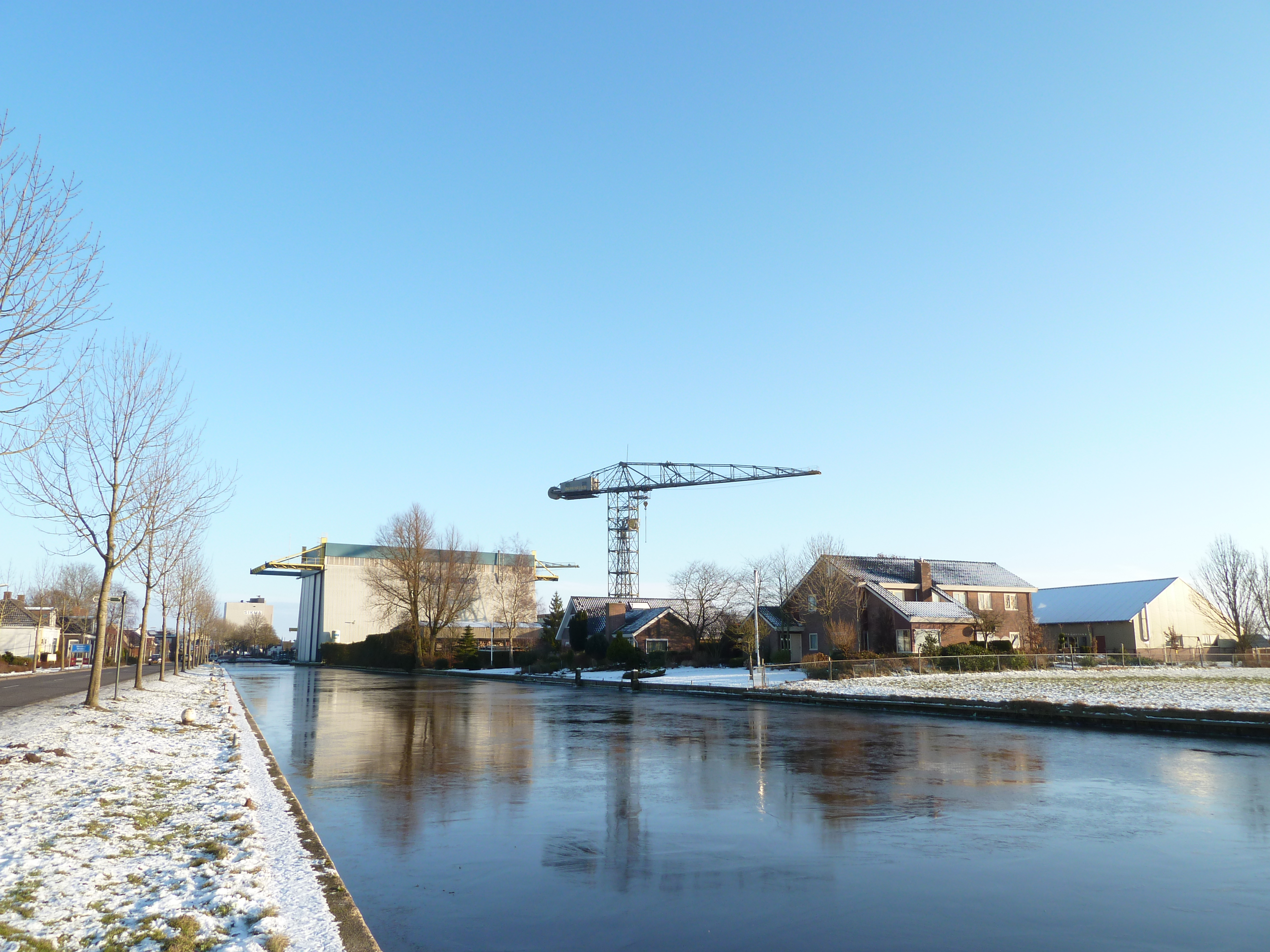
Hoendiep section near Stroobos (now Van Starkenborgh Canal)

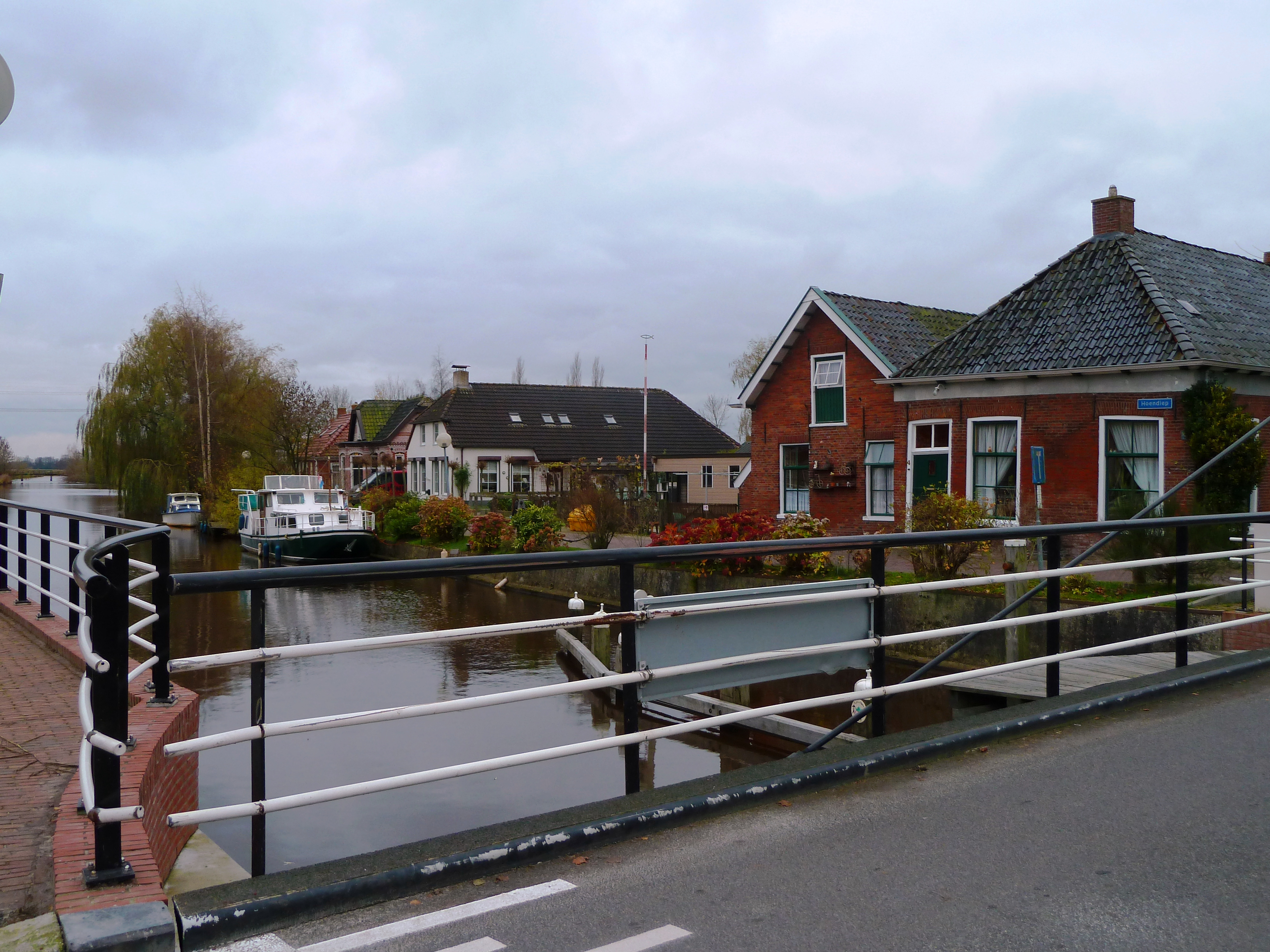
The Hoendiep in Enumatil

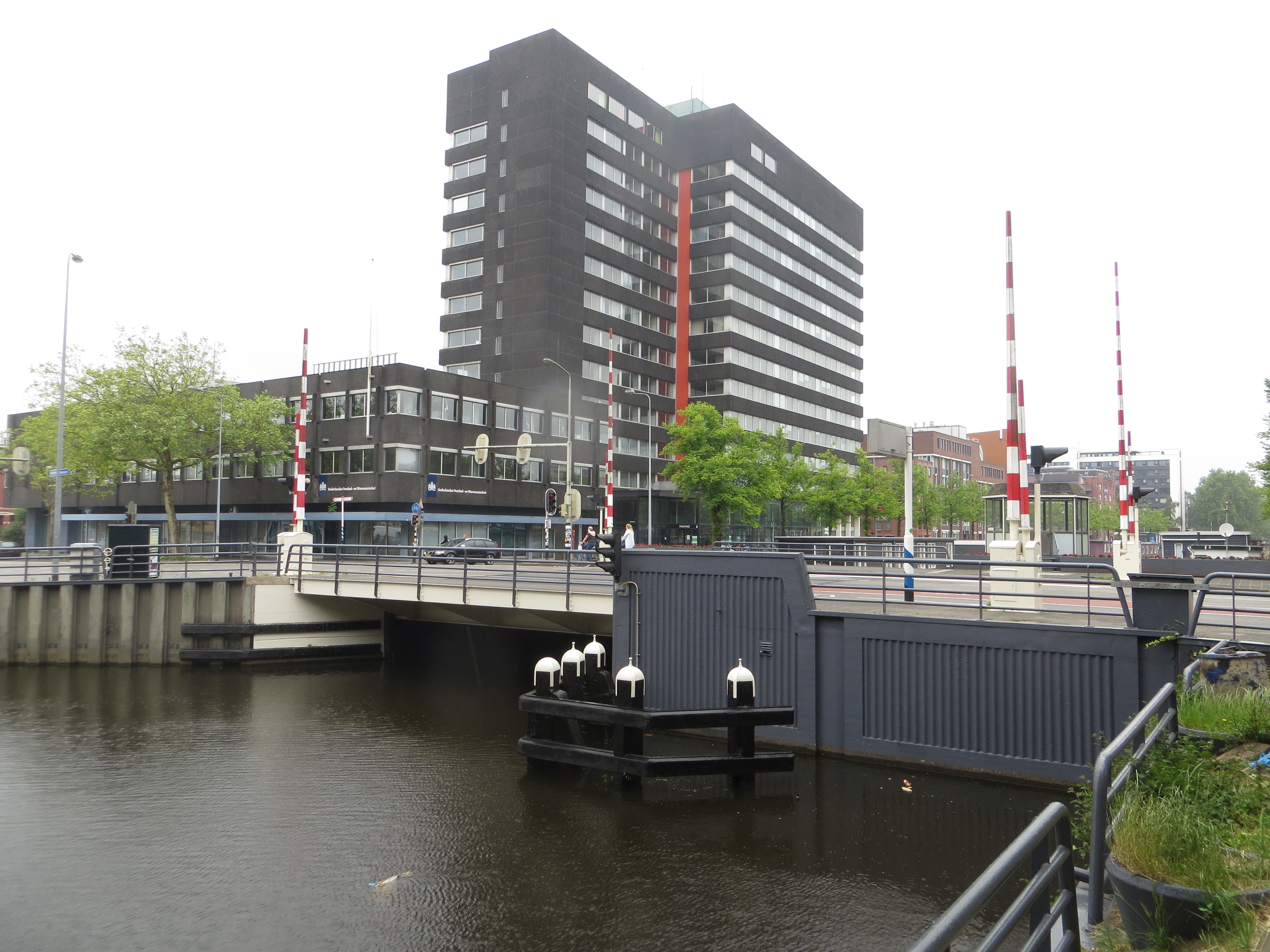
Bridge over the Hoendiep in Groningen

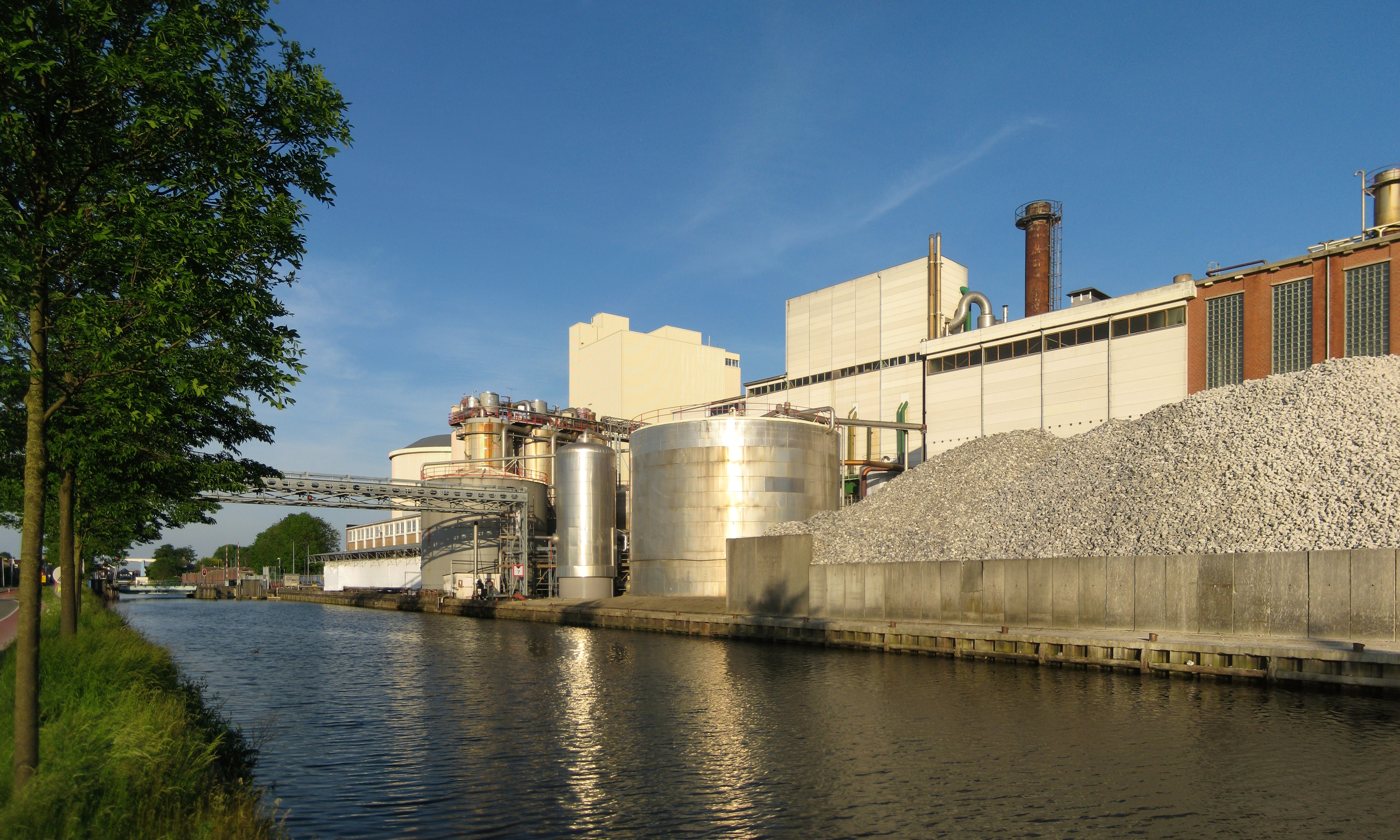
The Vierverlaten sugar factory on the Hoendiep
