= Sebaldeburen =

Sebaldeburen Seballeburen (Gronings)
- Village
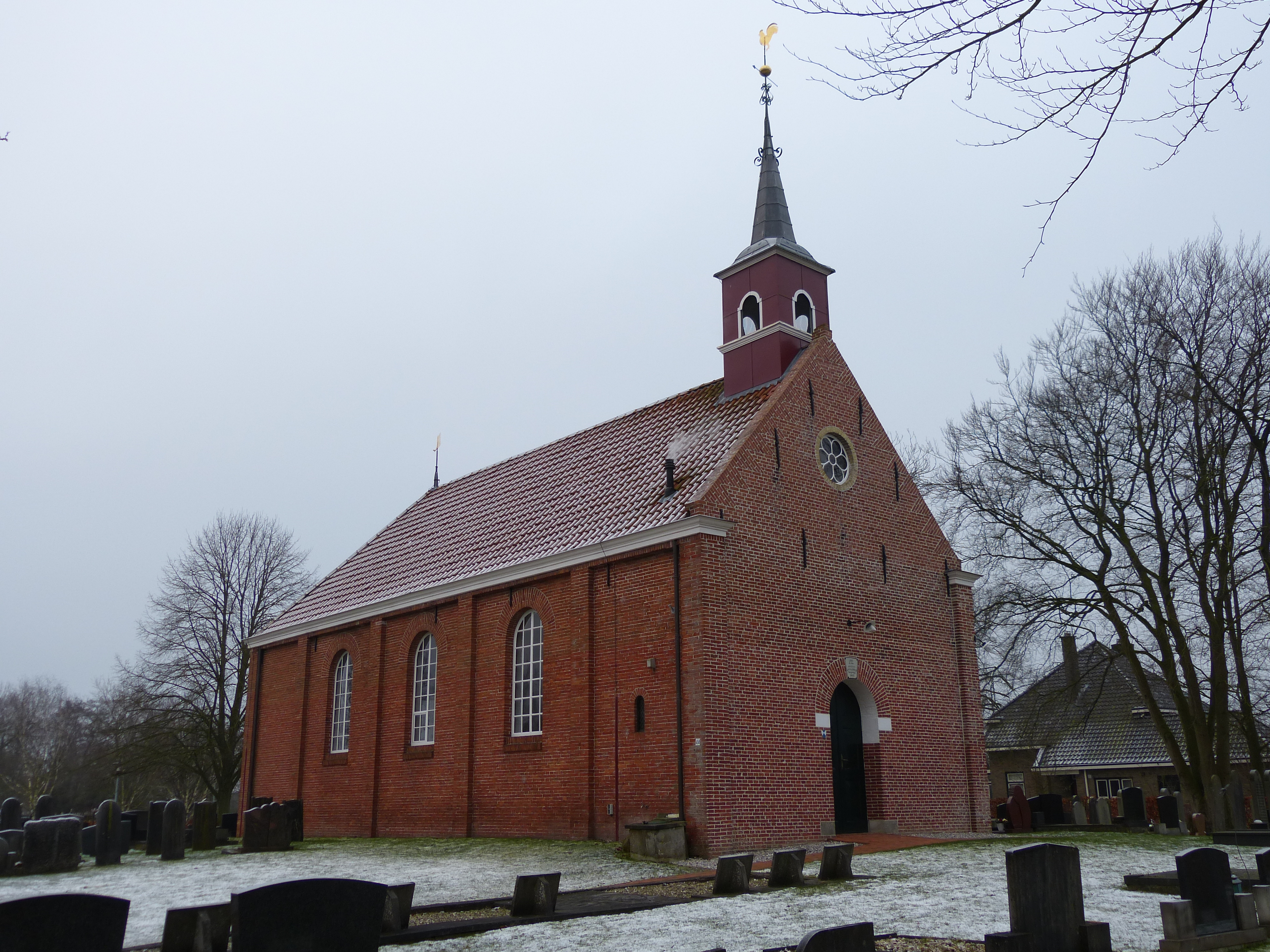
- Sebaldeburen church

- Coat of arms

- Location of the village in the province of Groningen Sebaldeburen (Netherlands)
- Coordinates: 53°13′N 6°17′E
- Country: Netherlands
- Province: Groningen
- Municipality: Westerkwartier

Area
  - Total: 5.82 km^{2} (2.25 sq mi)
- Elevation: 0.3 m (0.98 ft)

Population (2021)
  - Total: 565
  - Density: 97.1/km^{2} (251/sq mi)
- Time zone: UTC+1 (CET)
  - Summer (DST): UTC+2 (CEST)
- Postal code: 9862
- Dialing code: 0594

Sebaldeburen (Dutch: [səˌbɑldəˈbyːrə(n)]; Gronings: Seballeburen) is a village in the Westerkwartier municipality in the Dutch province of Groningen. It had a population of around 565 in 2021.

== History ==
The village was first mentioned in the 13th century as in Sibaldebuere hove, and means "settlement of Sibald (person)". Sebaldeburen is a road village which developed in the Middle Ages on a sandy ridge.

The Dutch Reformed church was built in 1807. The polder mill De Eendracht dates from 1887 as the replacement of a mill from 1801 that burnt down.

Sebaldeburen used to be the capital of the Langewold region. In 1811 it became part of the municipality of Grootegast. It was home to 278 people in 1840.

== Gallery ==
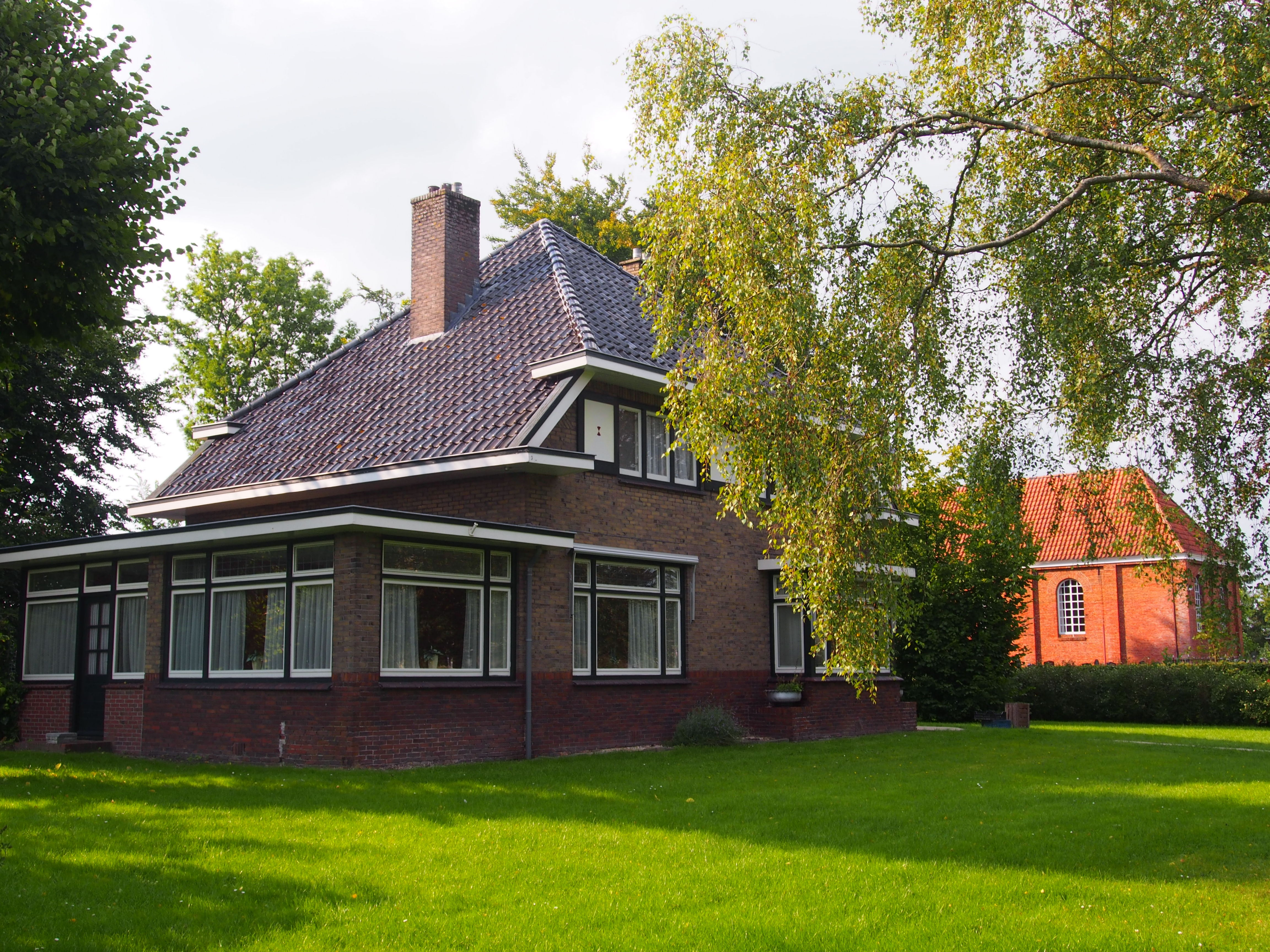
Former clergy house

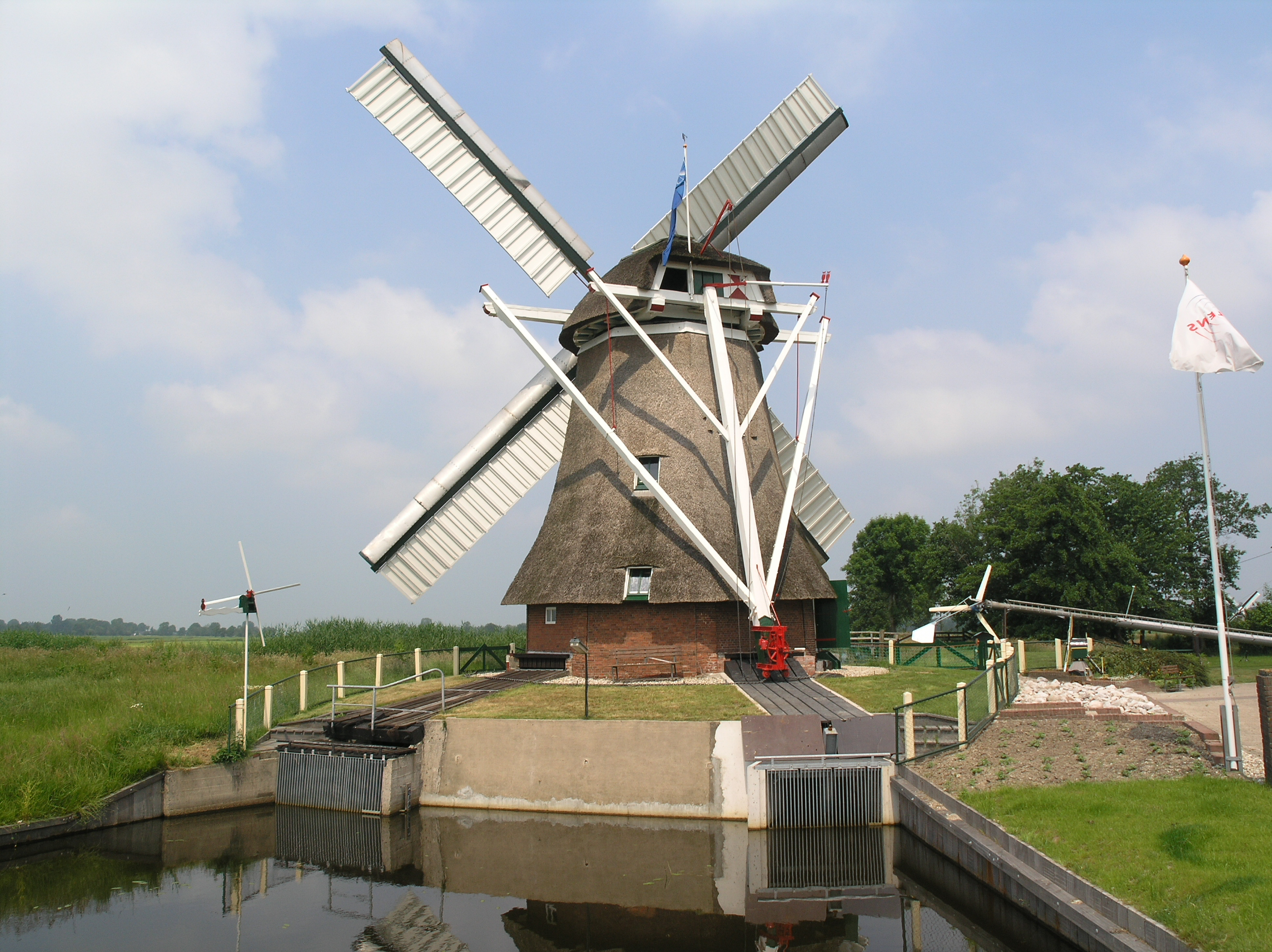
Windmill in Sebaldeburen
