= Peize =

- Village
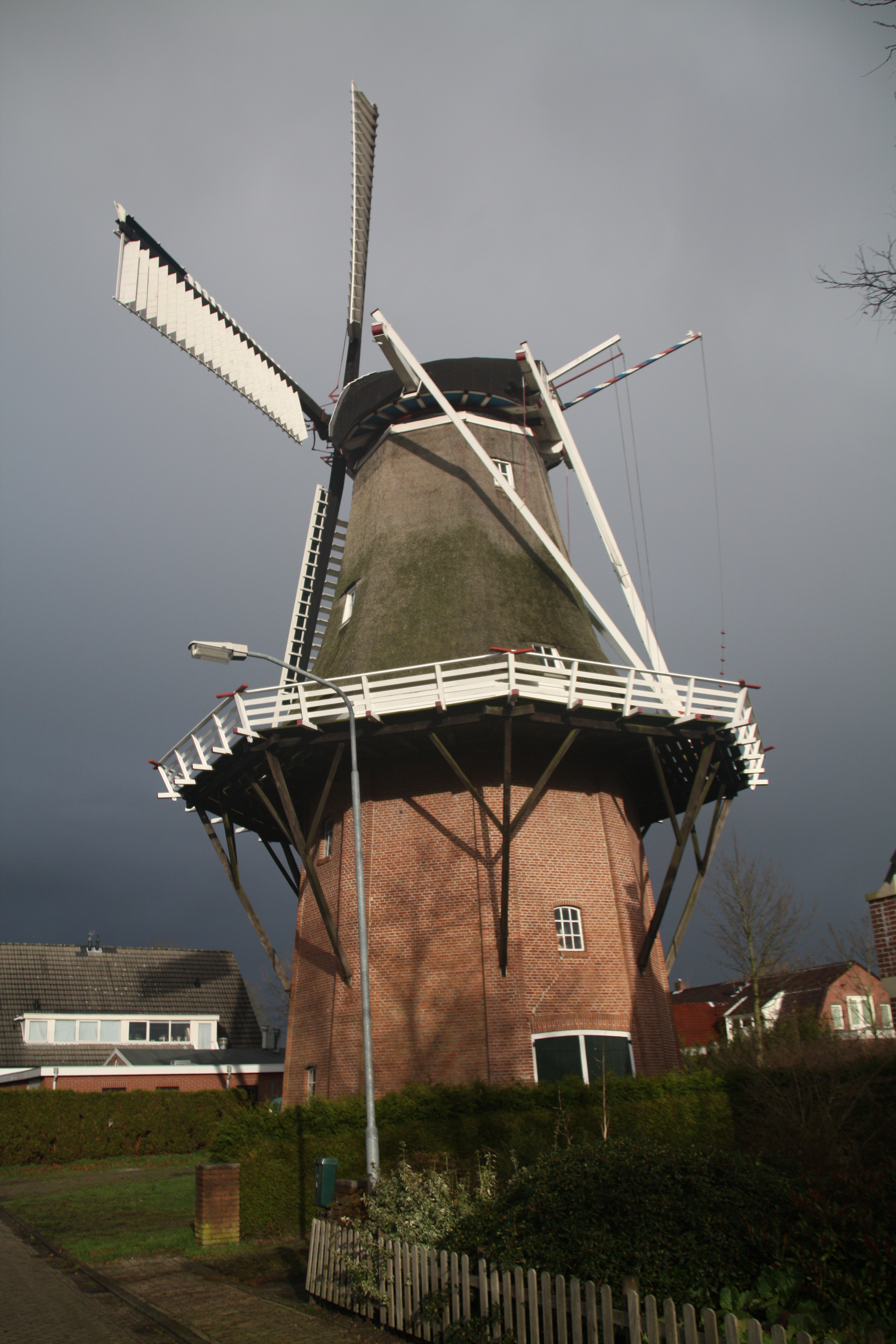
- Peiser Meul

- Flag Coat of arms

- Location in province of Drenthe in the Netherlands Peize (Netherlands)
- Coordinates: 53°8′52″N 6°29′46″E
- Country: Netherlands
- Province: Drenthe
- Municipality: Noordenveld

Area
  - Total: 3.16 km^{2} (1.22 sq mi)
- Elevation: 2 m (6.6 ft)

Population (2021)
  - Total: 4,405
  - Density: 1,390/km^{2} (3,610/sq mi)
- Time zone: UTC+1 (CET)
  - Summer (DST): UTC+2 (CEST)
- Postal code: 9321
- Dialing code: 050

Peize is a village in the Dutch province of Drenthe. Located in the northern part of Drenthe approximately 10 kilometers south of the city of Groningen. It is part of the municipality of Noordenveld, located between Roden and Eelde.

Peize was a separate municipality between 1817 and 1998, when it became part of Noordenveld.

At the present day it is a commuter village for the cities of Groningen and Assen.

== Education ==
Two public schools are located in Peize. They are named "De Eskampen" and "Het Spectrum", in 2009 they have moved to new buildings in close proximity to the sports accommodation. In the past a third school was located at 'De Pol'.

Adult and secondary education can be found in nearby villages or in the city of Groningen.

== Sport ==
Close to the center there is a sports accommodation. This houses a sports hall and several soccer fields and clay tennis courts. Several sports clubs can be found. These include soccer, volleyball, judo, marionettes, tennis.

== Transport ==
=== Bus ===
Qbuzz runs several buses.

- 86: Norg - Peize - Hoogkerk - Groningen (Main Station) (Only during peak hours)
- 4: Groningen (Beijum) - P+R Kardinge - Peize - Roden
- 17: Groningen (P+R Zernike) - Peize - (only in the morning)

=== Road ===
- N372: Connects Peize in the north to Groningen and to the west to Roden and Leek. At both ends it connects with the A7 Motorway
- N386: Goes Southbound towards Vries to connect with the A28 Motorway.

=== Air ===
The small international Groningen Airport Eelde is located 5 kilometers East of Peize. Mainly charter flights to holiday destinations are carried out here.

== Culture ==
- A late nineteenth century windmill can be found, which is open for public.
- A common hop (Humulus lupulus) garden.
- A thirteenth century church for public.

== Notable people ==
- Stefan Poutsma (born 1991), racing cyclist
- Joost Winnink (born 1971), former tennis player
