= Niekerk, Westerkwartier =

Niekerk
- Village
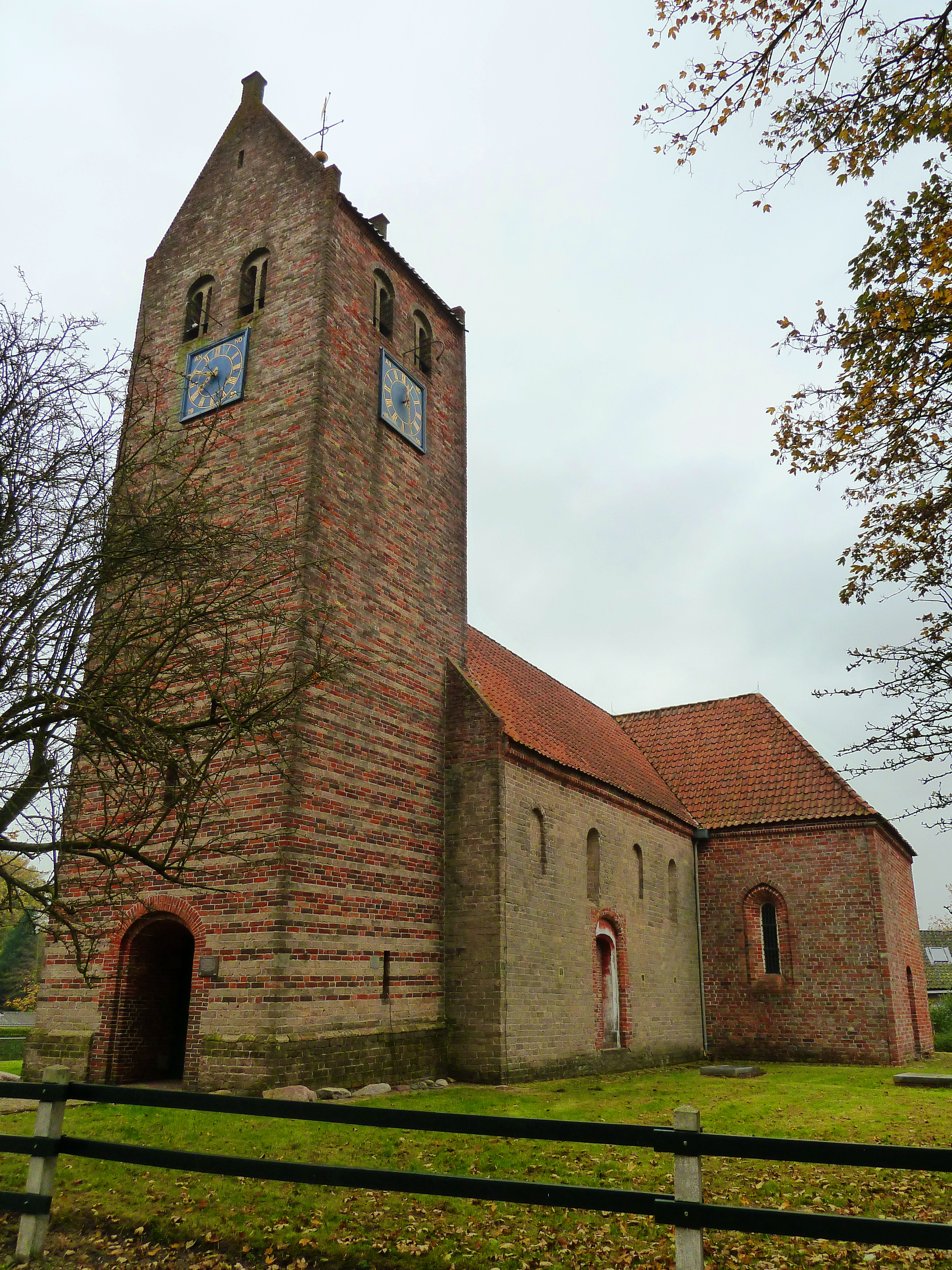
- Niekerk church

- Location of the village in the province of Groningen Niekerk (Netherlands)
- Coordinates: 53°13′N 6°21′E
- Country: Netherlands
- Province: Groningen
- Municipality: Westerkwartier

Area
  - Total: 1.03 km^{2} (0.40 sq mi)

Population (2021)
  - Total: 1,365
  - Density: 1,330/km^{2} (3,430/sq mi)
- Time zone: UTC+1 (CET)
  - Summer (DST): UTC+2 (CEST)
- Postal code: 9822
- Dialing code: 0594

Niekerk is a village in Westerkwartier municipality also in the Dutch province of Groningen. It had a population of around 1,365 in 2021.

== History ==
The village was first mentioned in 1392 as to der Nyerkerke, and means "new church". Nie- ("new") has been added to distinguish between Oldekerk. Niekerk is a road village which developed on a sandy ridge in a raised bog. During the Late Middle Ages, it started to overshadow neighbouring Oldekerk.

The Reformed church dates from around 1200. The tower was added in the 13th century. Between 1964 and 1967, it was restored, the plaster was removed and nave was returned to its original shape.

Niekerk was home to 440 people in 1840. It used to be part of the municipality of Oldekerk. In 1990, it became part of Grootegast and was merged into Westerkwartier in 2019.

== Gallery ==
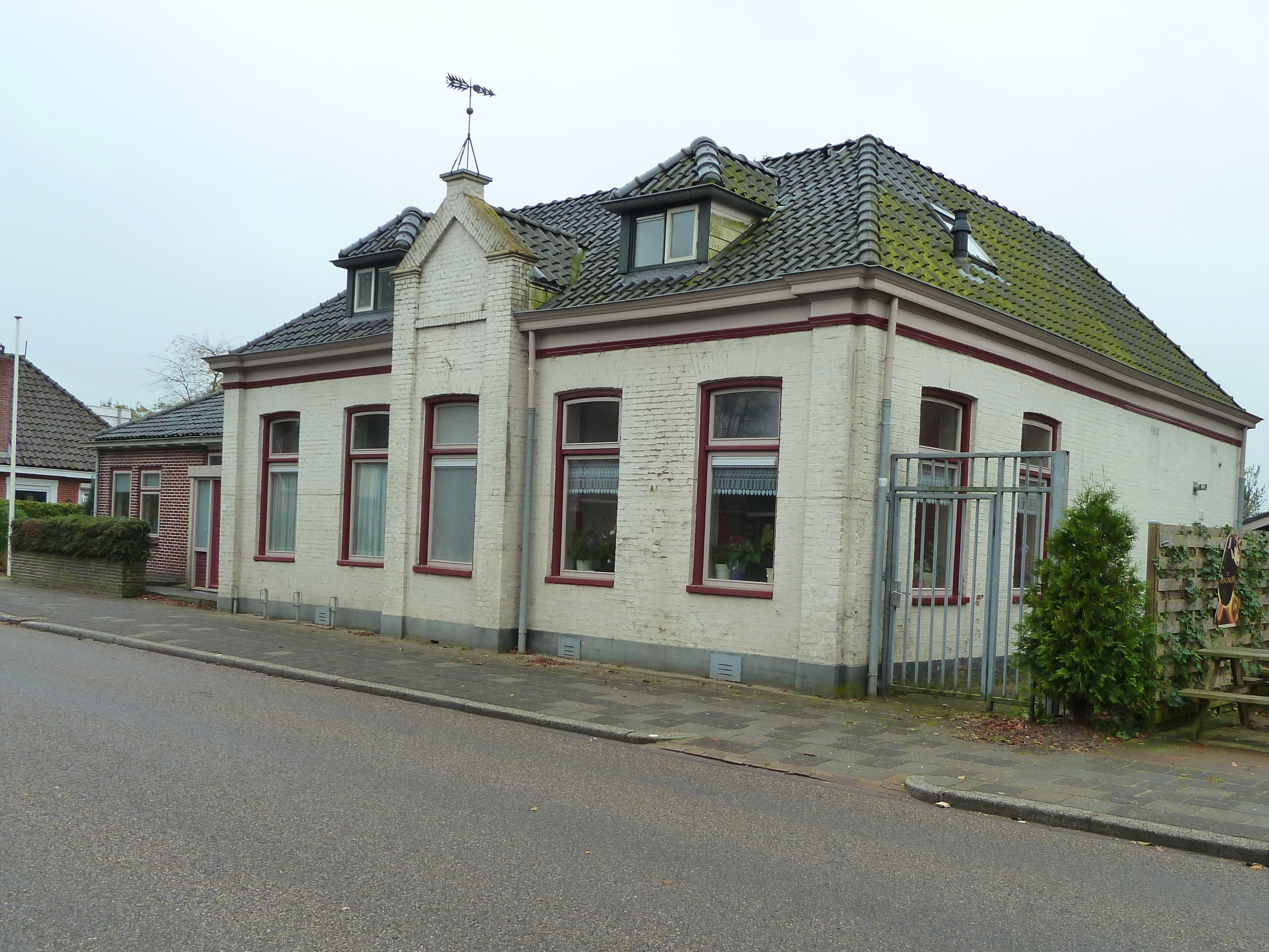
Former town hall

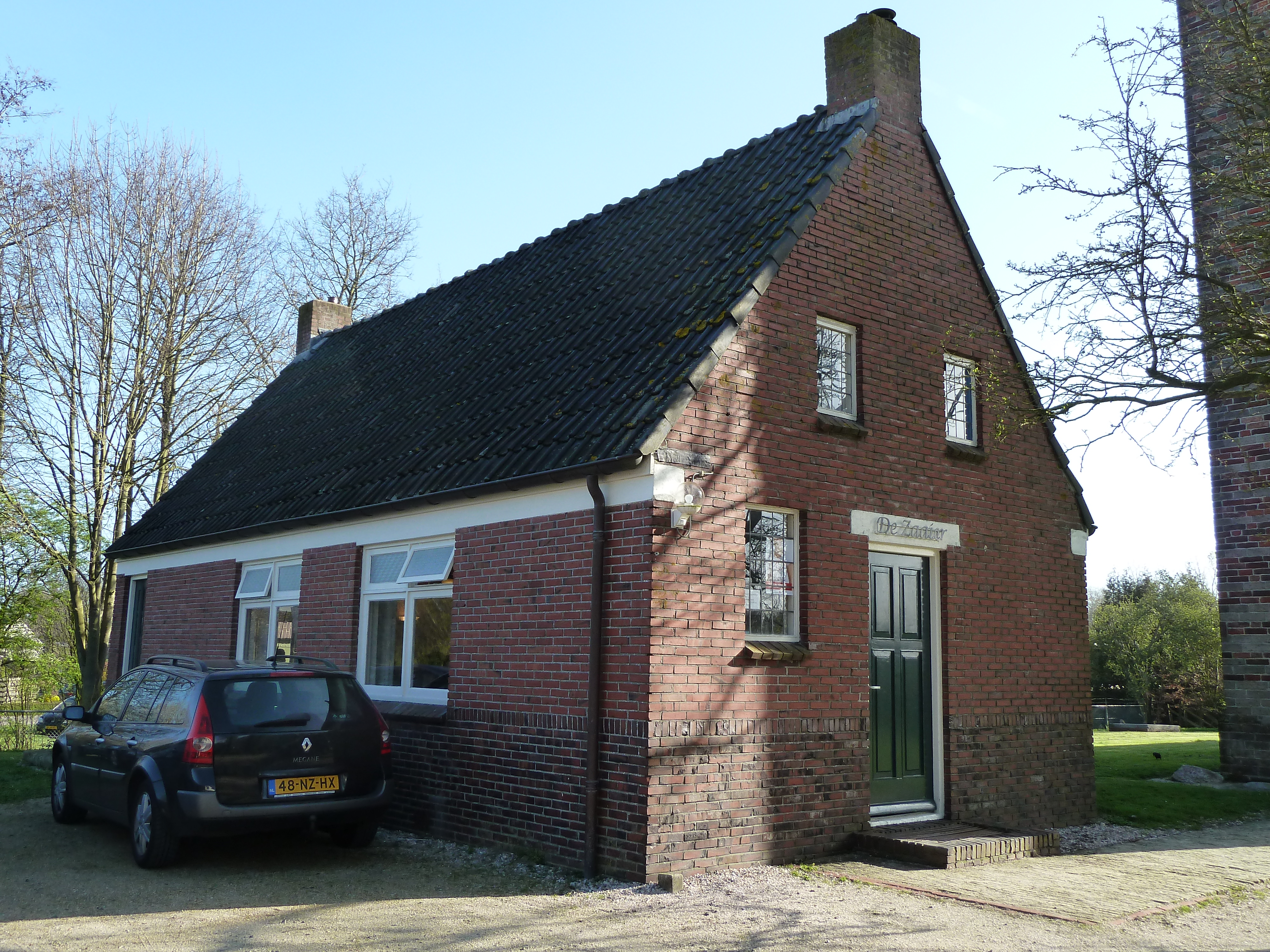
House in Niekerk

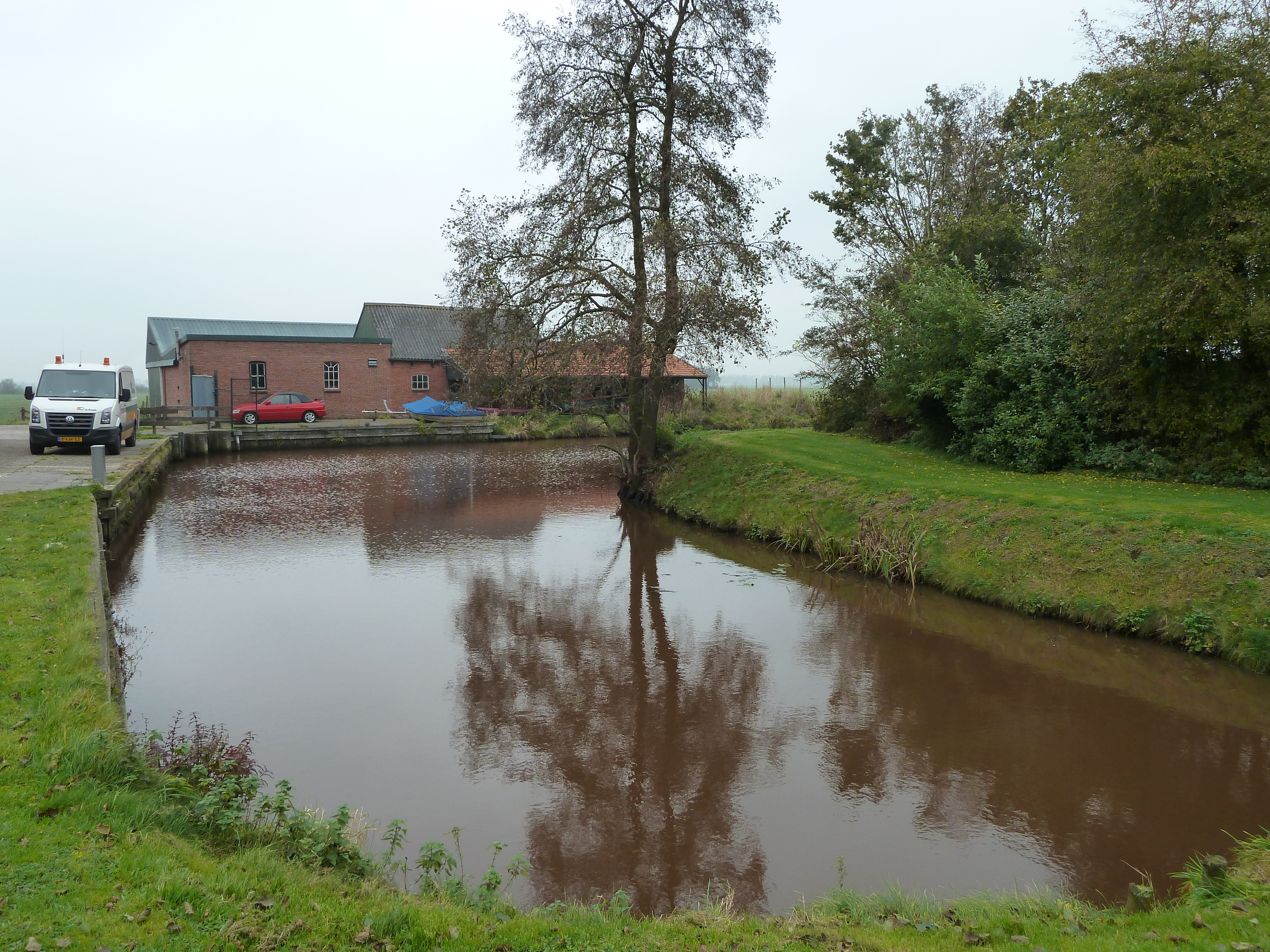
Harbour with former pumping station

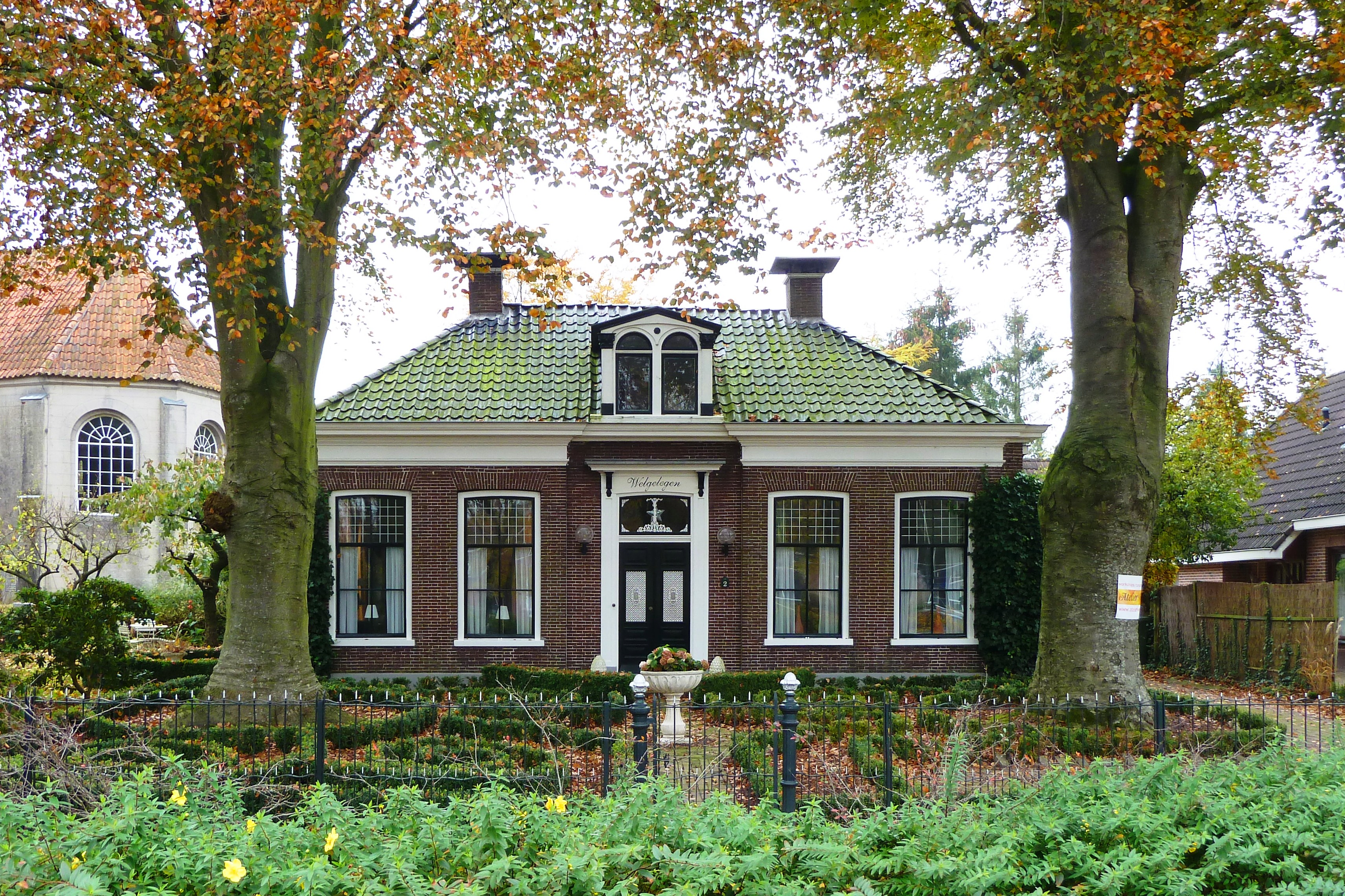
School master's house
