= Ron Groenewoud =

Dutch footballer and manager

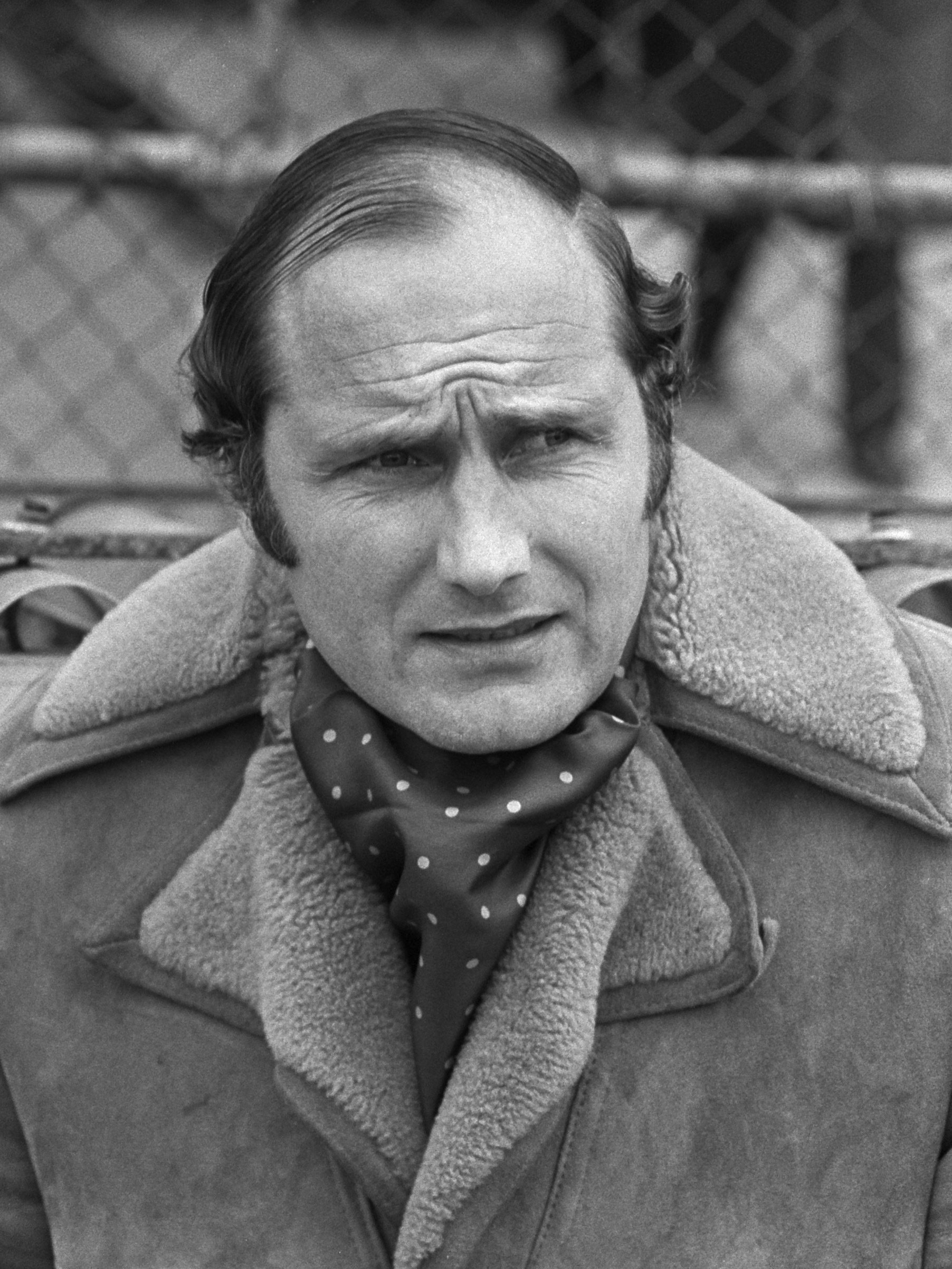
- Ron Groenewoud in 1974

Personal information
- Full name: Ron Groenewoud
- Date of birth: 24 January 1937 (age 89)
- Place of birth: Grootegast
- Position: Defender

Senior career*
Years	Team	Apps	(Gls)
1956-1960	Velocitas 1897	32	(0)

Managerial career
- 1962–1965: Sparta (assistant)
- 1965–1966: Holland Sport
- 1966–1967: Heerenveen
- 1967–1970: KNVB (various teams)
- 1971–1975: FC Groningen
- 1975–1996: KNVB (various teams)
- 1976: Netherlands Women
- 1986: Netherlands Women
- * Club domestic league appearances and goals

Ron Groenewoud (born 24 January 1937) is a Dutch retired footballer and football manager.

== Playing career ==
During his football career, he played as a defender for Velocitas 1897 from Groningen.

== Managerial career ==
After his playing career, he was assistant coach at Sparta for three years, under head coaches Denis Neville and Bill Thompson. Afterwards, he managed Holland Sport, Heerenveen, FC Groningen and various teams of the Royal Dutch Football Association (KNVB), including the women's national team. He also coached the men's national futsal team, achieving second place at the 1989 World Championship and qualification for the 1992 World Championship, 1996 UEFA Championship and 1996 World Championship.

A great story is the Dick Nanninga one, when Groenewoud was manager of FC Groningen and Nanninga played for local rivals Oosterparkers. Groenewoud denied knowing Nanninga when he was asked if he was interested in the player; Nanninga in the end made it to the national team when Groenewoud was an assistant. When Groenewoud introduced himself, Nanninga denied knowing him and did not shake his hand.

He retired in 1997.
