= Briltil =

Briltil (de) Bril (Gronings)
- Village
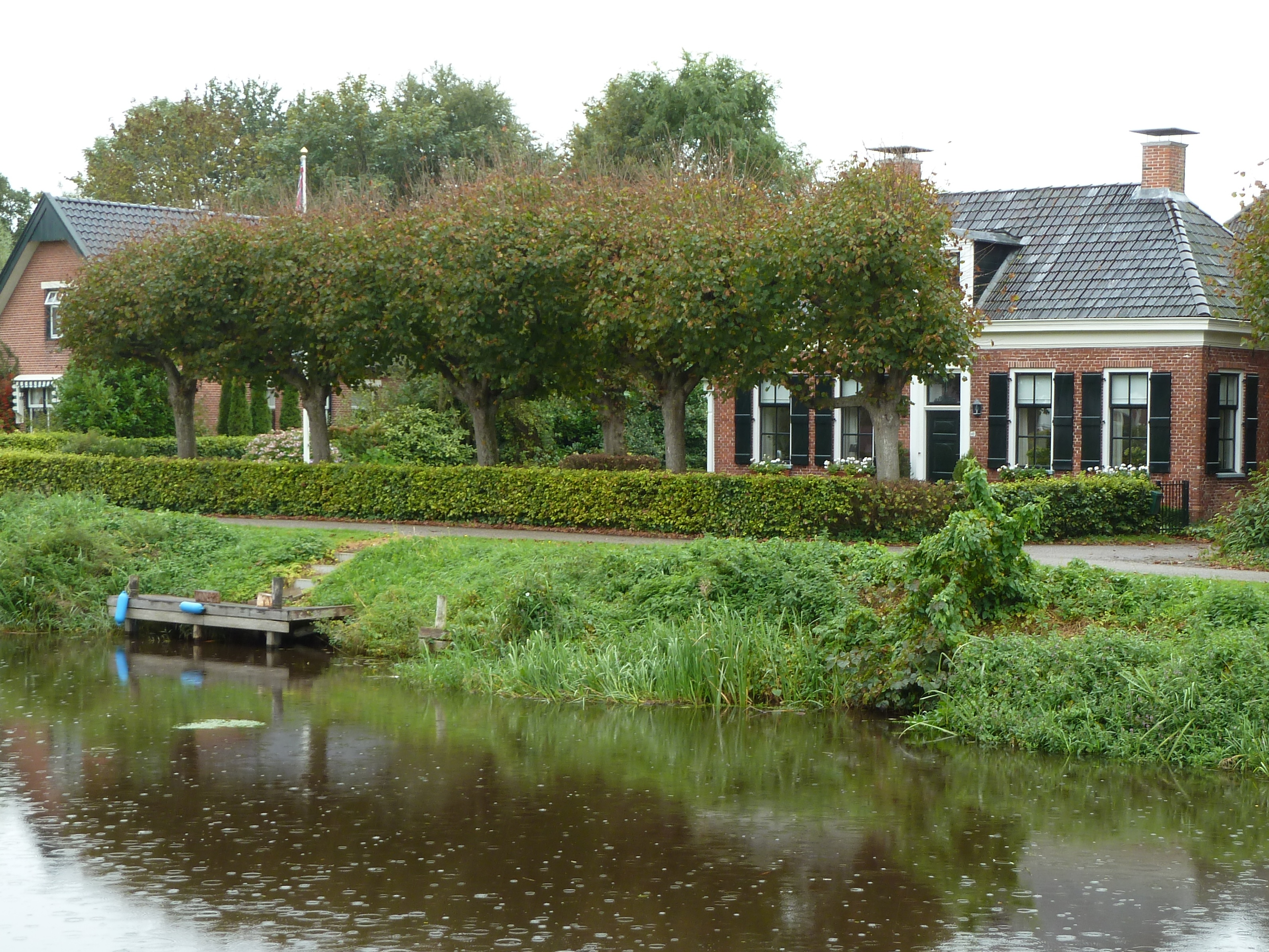
- Briltil houses at the Hoendiep

- Location in the province of Groningen in the Netherlands Briltil (Netherlands)
- Coordinates: 53.24217°N 6.38842°E
- Country: Netherlands
- Province: Groningen
- Municipality: Westerkwartier
- Elevation: 0.1 m (0.33 ft)

Population (2021)
  - Total: 490
- Time zone: UTC+1 (CET)
  - Summer (DST): UTC+2 (CEST)
- Postcode: 9805
- Area code: 0594

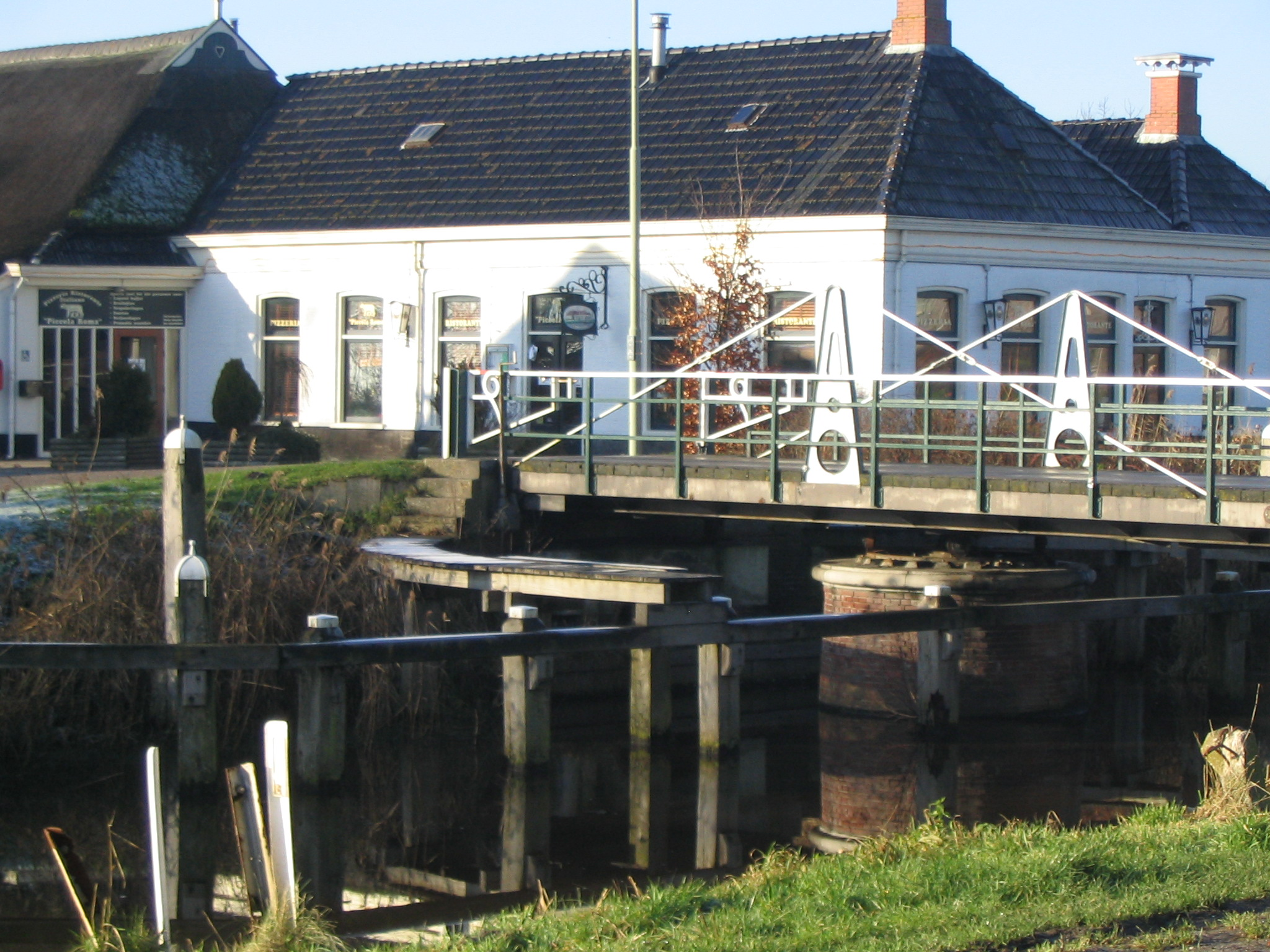
'White House' in Briltil

Briltil (Dutch: [ˈbrɪltɪl]; Gronings: (de) Bril) is a village in the municipality of Westerkwartier in the province of Groningen in the Netherlands, founded around 1600. The name of the village comes from a drawbridge (til) over the Hoendiep to the region of the Bril (bril means 'swampy land') northwest of the bridge. As of 2021, Briltil had a population of 490. Since about 2004, the village has consisted of a new housing estate on the east side of the Hoendiep and a small number of historic buildings and a marina on the west side. The village of Zuidhorn is right next to Briltil.

The white swing bridge over the Hoendiep is generally called the Briltil, but is actually called Brildraai. The actual Briltil is an older fixed bridge right next to it. This bridge crosses the Schipsloot, which flows into the Hoendiep.

The old ferry house at the Brildraai is in use as a restaurant annex village hall.

== History ==
The village was founded just before 1600. Since 1575, Briltil has been intersected by the Kolonelsdiep and since the 1650s by the Hoendiep, which was the main shipping route from the city of Groningen to Friesland until the 1930s. A tow road was built along the canal, which was later paved with rubble. This sparked business. In the 19th century there were a number of hulling and oil mills, the Barkmeyer shipyard, and in 1891 a milk factory was built (from 1914 to 1970 owned by the Leeuwarder Ice and Milk Products Factories Lijempf, and closed in 1984). The village was once known as the 'Zaanstreek of the North'.

With the digging of the new Van Starkenborgh Canal, the Hoendiep was no longer important and activity in the village also declined. Commercial shipping made way for pleasure craft, for which there is a marina at Briltil.

The village of Zuidhorn grew strongly as a commuter town during the second half of the 20th century and then came to lie directly against Briltil in the 1990s due to the construction of the Hoendiep district so that there is no longer any separation between the villages of Briltil and Zuidhorn. Later, the Parkplan-west district was also built north of Briltil, so that the village is now sandwiched on three sides by Zuidhorn. The milk factory was demolished in 2002 to make way for new construction (the director's house was spared). As a result, the number of inhabitants of Briltil almost doubled between 2002 and 2011. With this, Zuidhorn seemed to absorb Briltil as a district but residents from the village successfully demonstrated for the preservation of place and place name signs. In 2002, Briltil also celebrated its 400th anniversary.
