= Oldekerk =

Oldekerk Ollekèrk (Gronings)
- Village
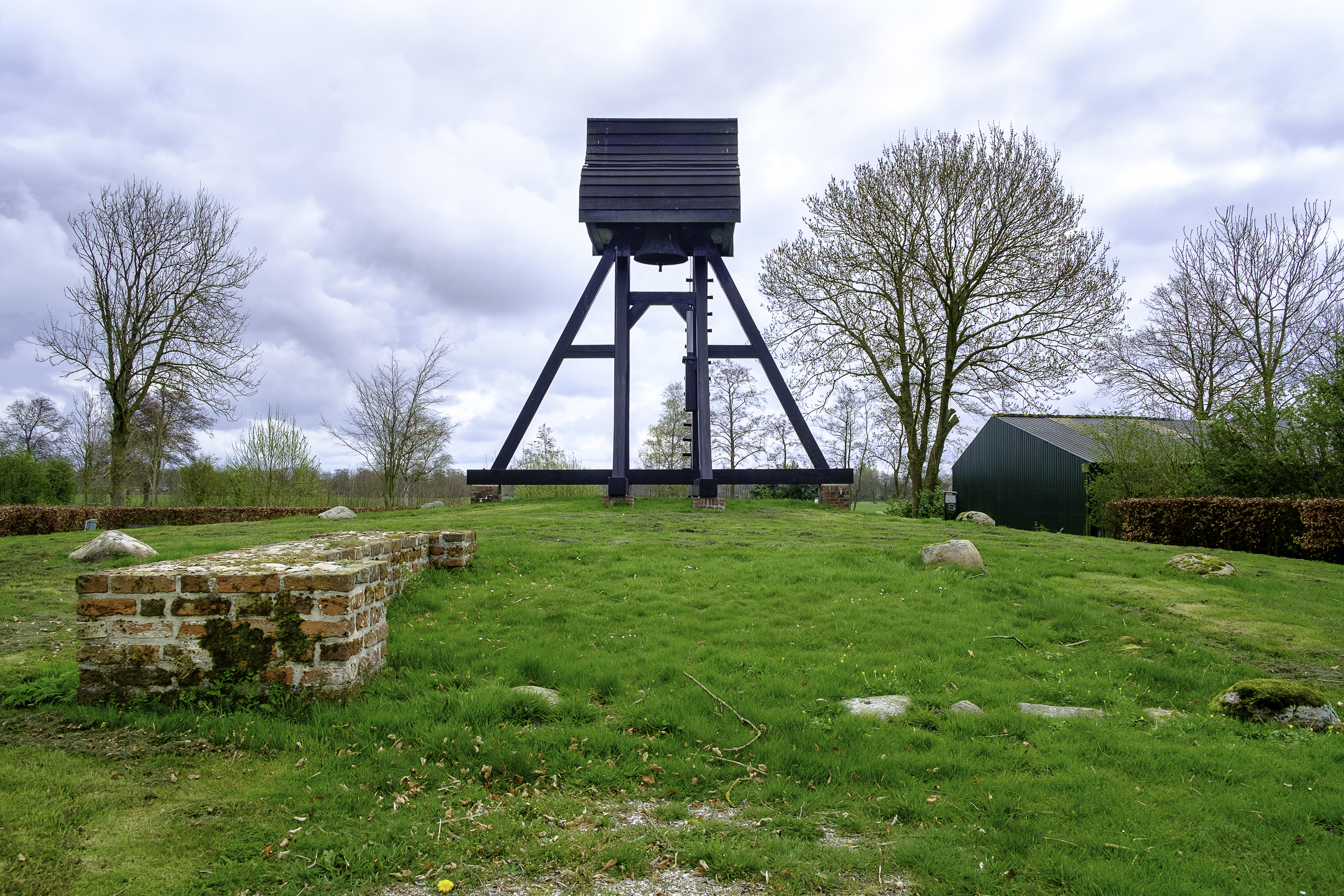
- Bell tower of Oldekerk

- Flag Coat of arms

- Location of Oldekerk in Groningen in the Netherlands Oldekerk (Netherlands)
- Coordinates: 53°13′10″N 6°20′20″E
- Country: Netherlands
- Province: Groningen
- Municipality: Westerkwartier

Area
  - Total: 20.41 km^{2} (7.88 sq mi)
- Elevation: 0.6 m (2.0 ft)

Population (2021)
  - Total: 1,540
  - Density: 75.5/km^{2} (195/sq mi)
- Time zone: UTC+1 (CET)
  - Summer (DST): UTC+2 (CEST)
- Postal code: 9821
- Dialing code: 0594

Oldekerk (Dutch: [ˈɔldəˌkɛr(ə)k]; Gronings: Ollekèrk) is a village in the Dutch province of Groningen. It is located in the municipality of Westerkwartier, about 15 km west of the city of Groningen.

Oldekerk was a separate municipality until 1990, when it was merged with Grootegast.

== History ==
The village was first mentioned in 1320 as Aeldakerka, and means "old church". Olde- ('old') has been added to distinguish between Niekerk.

The Reformed church was demolished in the 17th century. Only a bell tower remained standing. The bell tower was rebuilt in 1939. In 1856, a Reformed Church was built and replaced in 1966.

Oldekerk was home to 442 people in 1840. It used to be an independent municipality until 1990, when it was merged into Grootegast. In 2019, it became part of Westerkwartier.
