= Doezum =

- Village
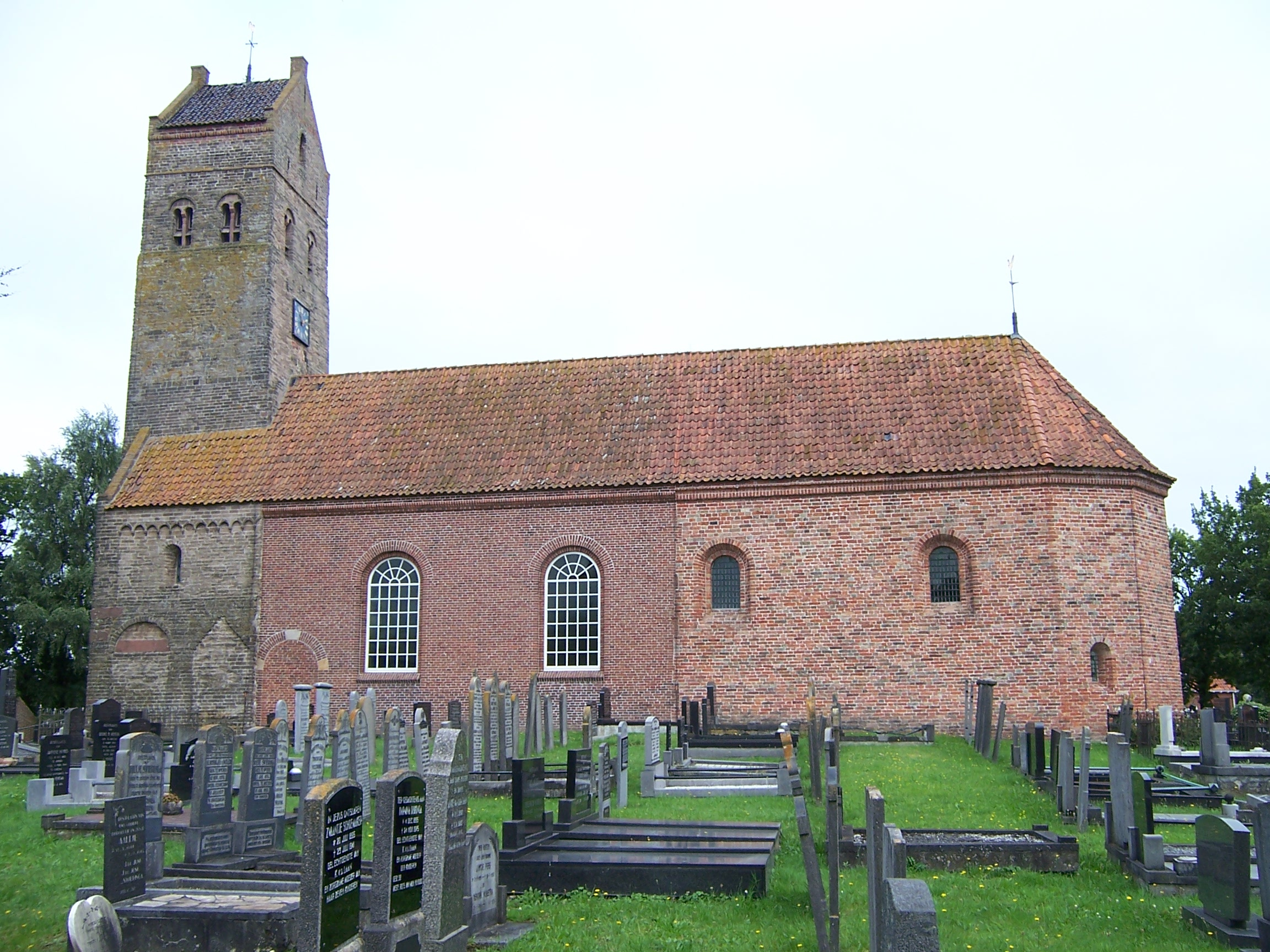
- Doezum church

- Location of the village in the province of Groningen Doezum (Netherlands)
- Coordinates: 53°12′N 6°15′E
- Country: Netherlands
- Province: Groningen
- Municipality: Westerkwartier

Area
  - Total: 1.01 km^{2} (0.39 sq mi)
- Elevation: 1.0 m (3.3 ft)

Population (2021)
  - Total: 725
  - Density: 718/km^{2} (1,860/sq mi)
- Time zone: UTC+1 (CET)
  - Summer (DST): UTC+2 (CEST)
- Postal code: 9863
- Dialing code: 0594

Doezum is a village in the municipality of Westerkwartier in the Dutch province of Groningen. It had a population of around 725 in January 2017.

== History ==
The village was first mentioned in 1475 as "Uteradosum alias Dosum". The etymology is unclear. Doezum is a road village which developed in the Early Middle Ages.

The lower part of the tower of the Dutch Reformed church dates from the 12th century. The church was altered and extended several times. In 1808, it received its current shape and most of the tower of the tower was rebuilt. Between 1954 and 1957, it was restored, however a Roman-style entrance was added which was never part of the original design.

Doezum was home to 593 people in 1840. It used to be part of the municipality of Grootegast. In 2018, it became part of Westerkwartier.

== Gallery ==
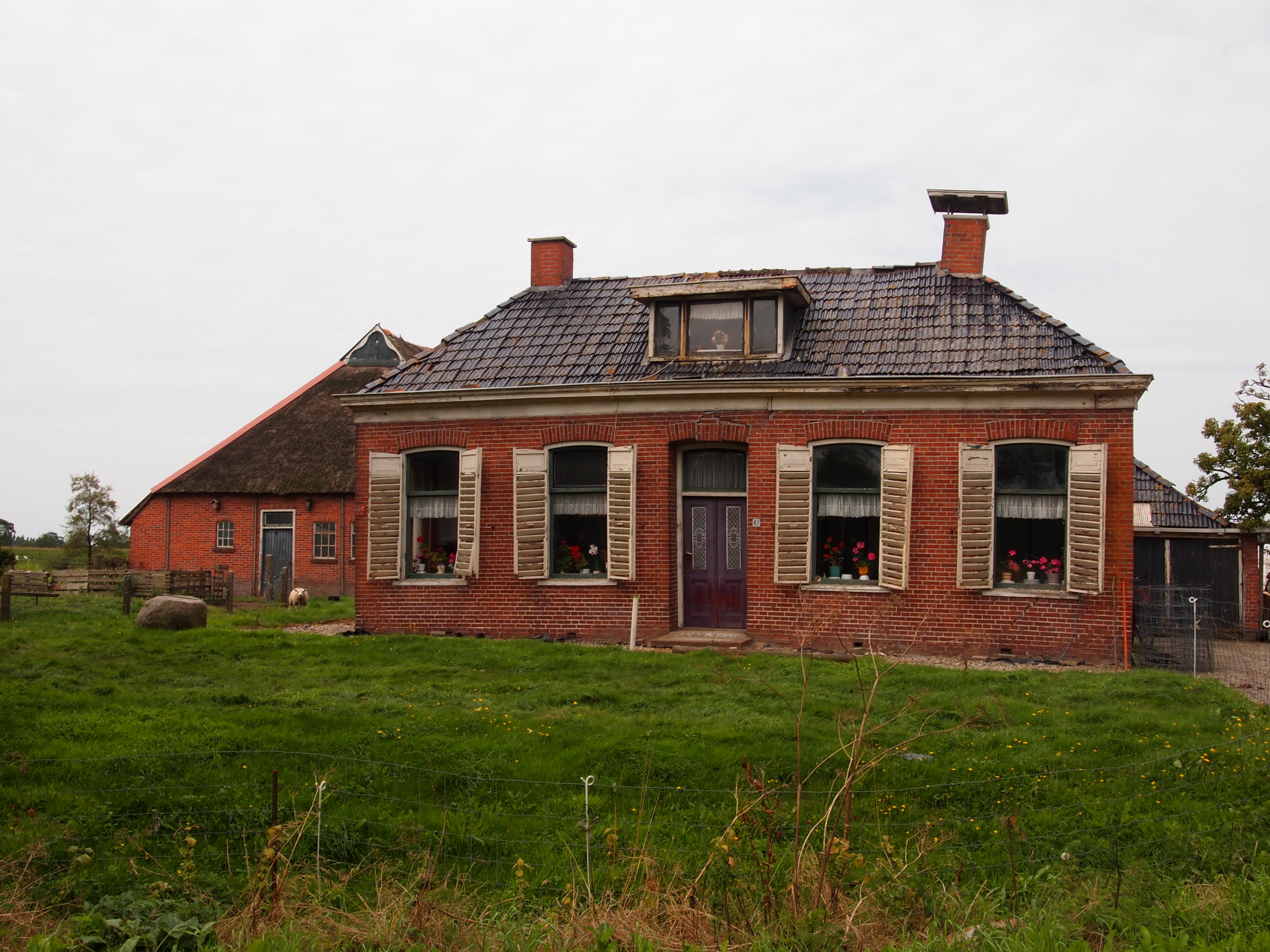
Farm in Doezum

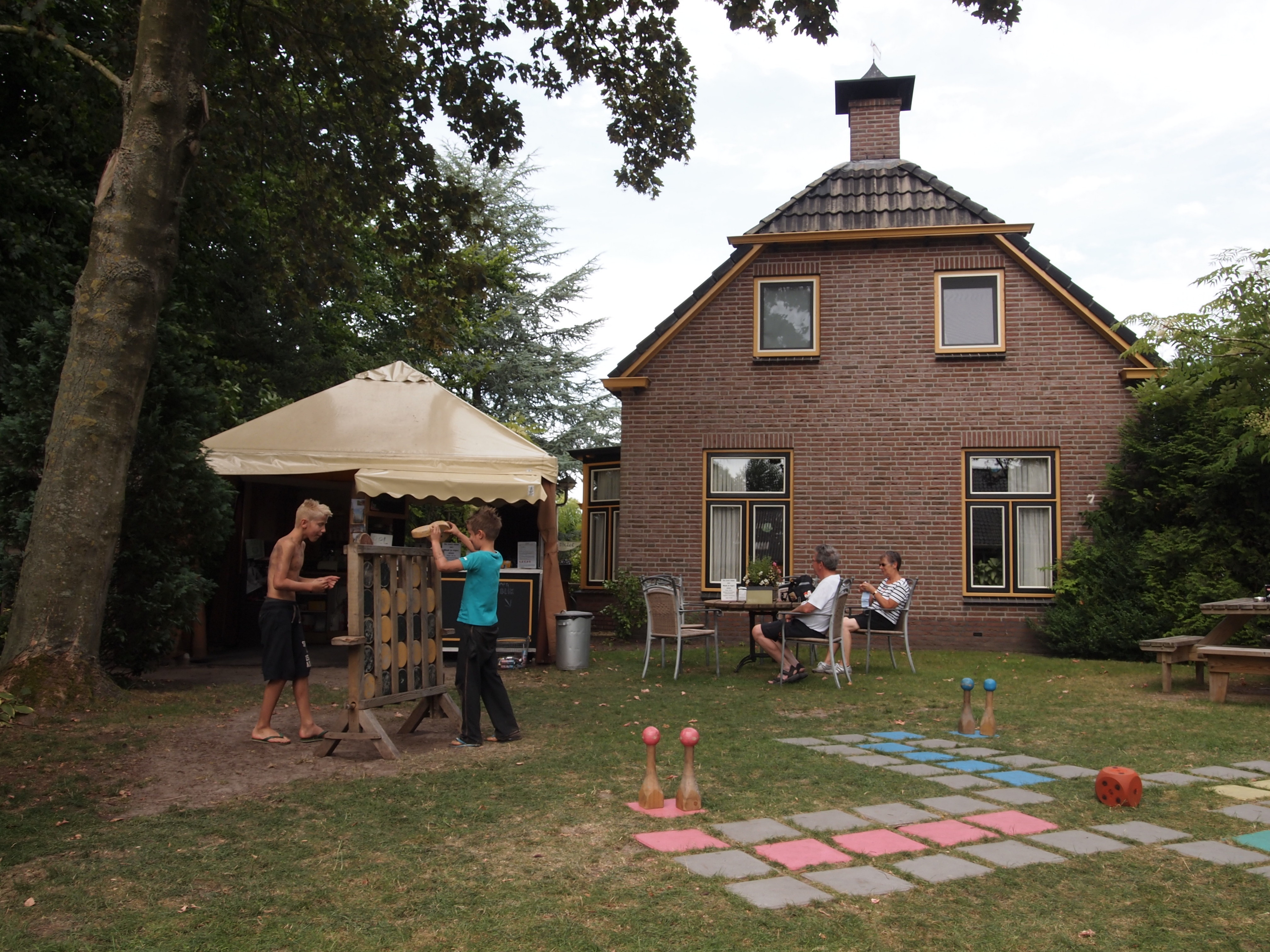
House in Doezum

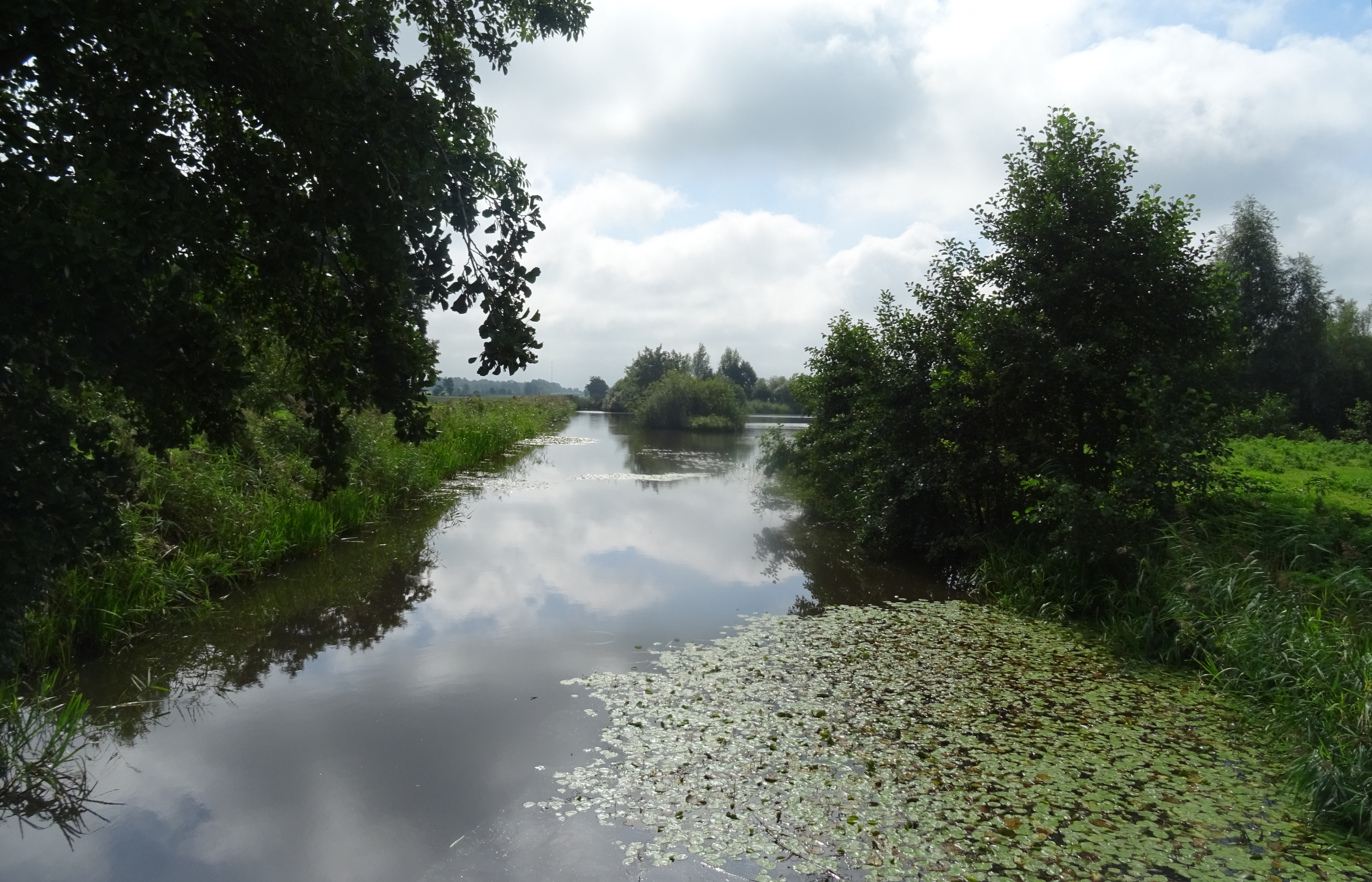
Stream near Doezum

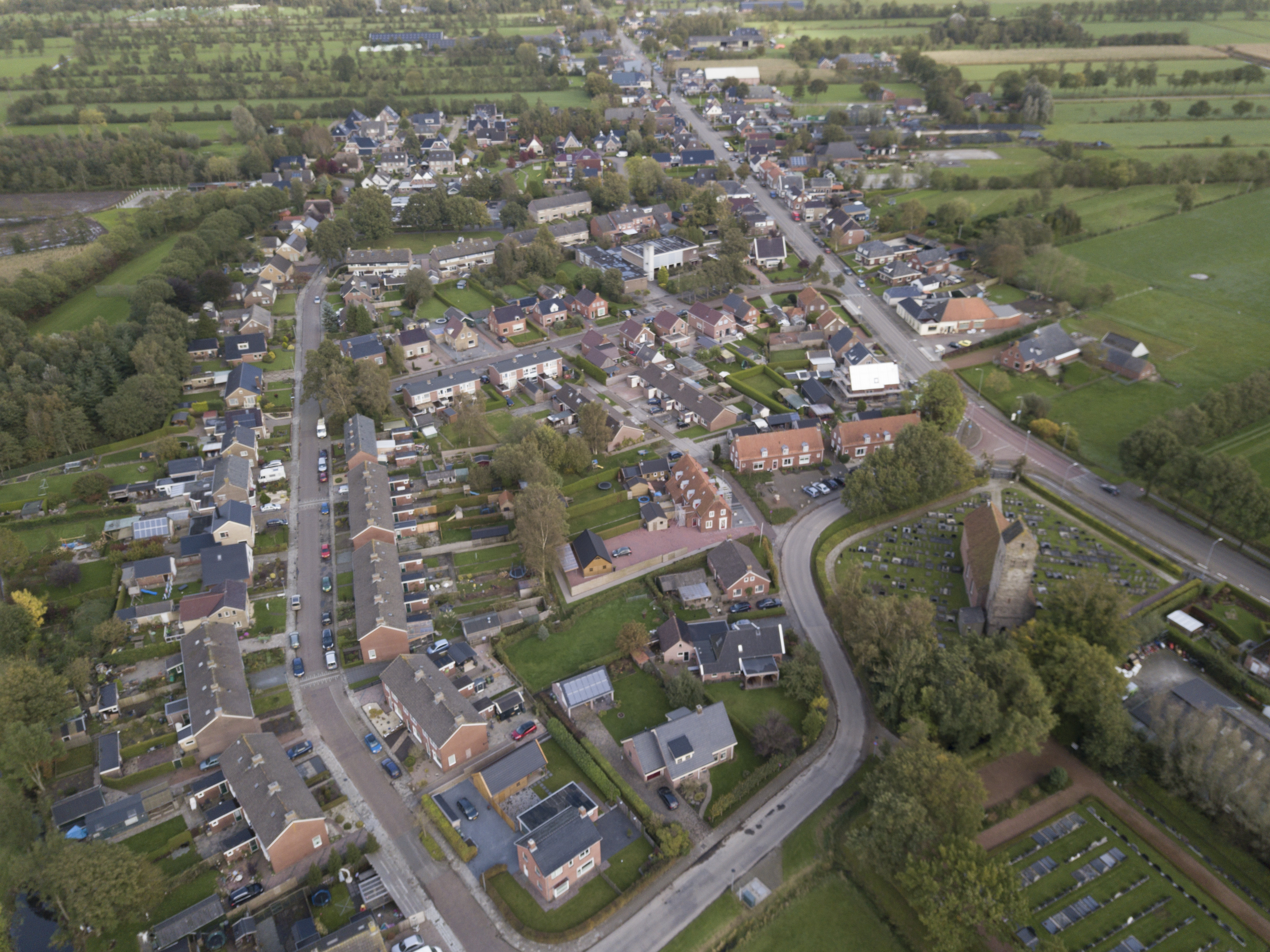
Aerial view
