= Zuidhorn =

- Town, former municipality
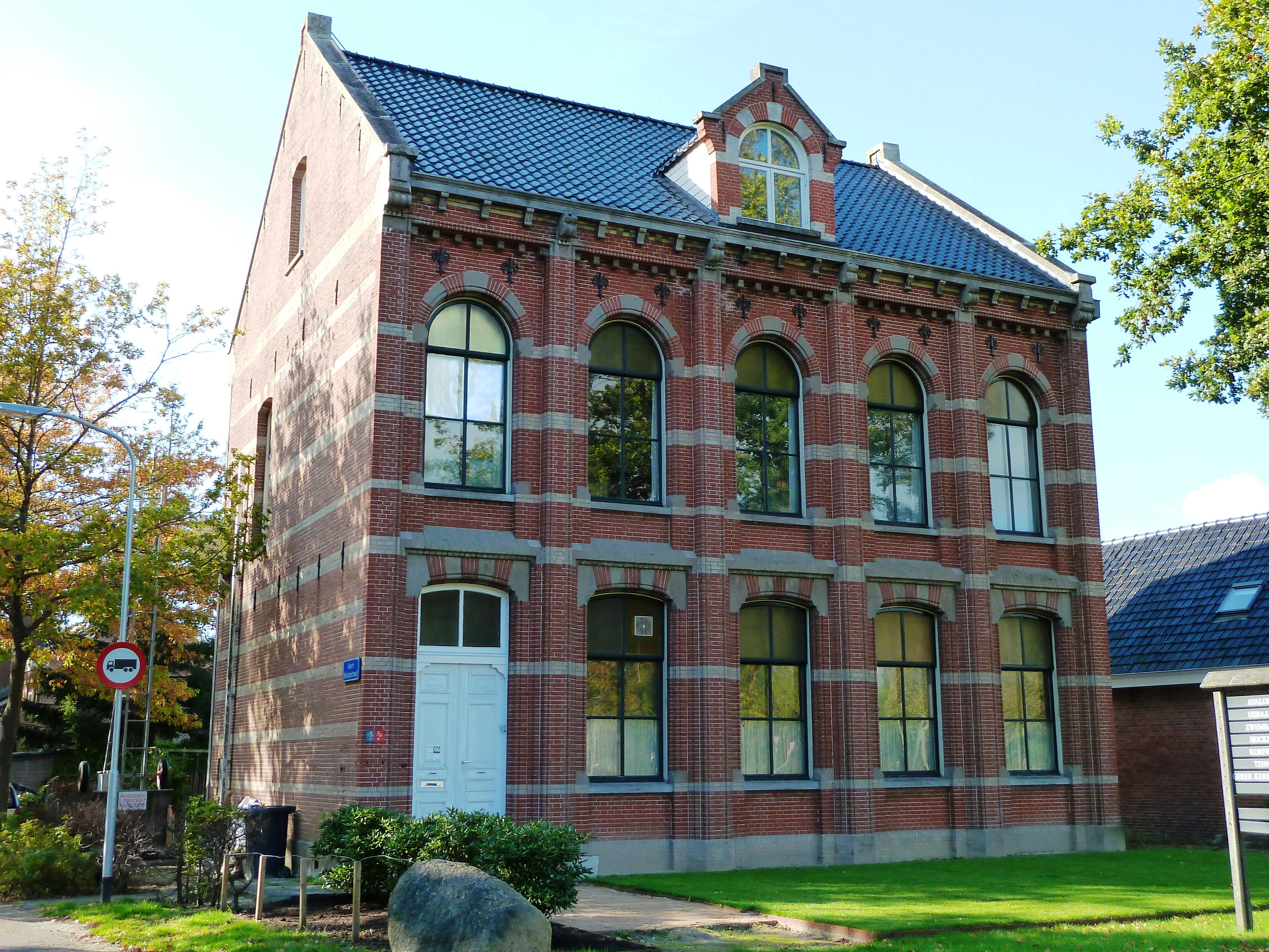
- Former courthouse in Zuidhorn

- Flag Coat of arms

- Location in Groningen
- Coordinates: 53°15′N 6°24′E
- Country: Netherlands
- Province: Groningen
- Municipality: Westerkwartier

Area
  - Total: 2.92 km^{2} (1.13 sq mi)
- Elevation: 4 m (13 ft)

Population (2021)
  - Total: 7,240
  - Density: 2,480/km^{2} (6,420/sq mi)
- Time zone: UTC+1 (CET)
  - Summer (DST): UTC+2 (CEST)
- Postcode: Parts of 9800 range
- Area code: 0594
- Website: www.zuidhorn.nl

Zuidhorn (Dutch pronunciation: [zœytˈɦɔr(ə)n]; Gronings: Zuudhörn [zytˈɦœːn]) is a town and former municipality in the northeastern Netherlands. The town largely depends on the city of Groningen. A railway line, operated by Arriva, connects the town with Leeuwarden in Friesland and Groningen.

Due to a municipal reorganisation in 1990, Zuidhorn municipality was extended when it merged with, though not physically connected to Oldehove, Grijpskerk and Aduard. On 1 January 2019, the municipality was dissolved and merged into the municipality of Westerkwartier.

== Transport ==
Zuidhorn has two train stations: Zuidhorn and Grijpskerk. At least once an hour a train runs between Groningen and Leeuwarden. On weekdays, trains stop twice an hour in Zuidhorn. Until 1991 there used to be a third station on this line, Visvliet.

== Nature ==
In the center of Zuidhorn, lies a large, partly wooded park called "Johan Smit Park". It offers a wide variety of recreation, open to the public, based on trails. The "Quick Silver S" is the main sport hall, hosting many activities such as a running clubs, and other sports. Nearby, the park has numerous football fields and a playground. For most of the year, docile highland cattle roam the park.

== Wierden ==
There is a dense concentration of terps, better known as wierden, artificial dwelling hills, in the area Middag-Humsterland. In 1995, this collection of wierden was submitted to UNESCO's list of World Heritage Sites. The property is currently on the tentative list.

== Population centres ==
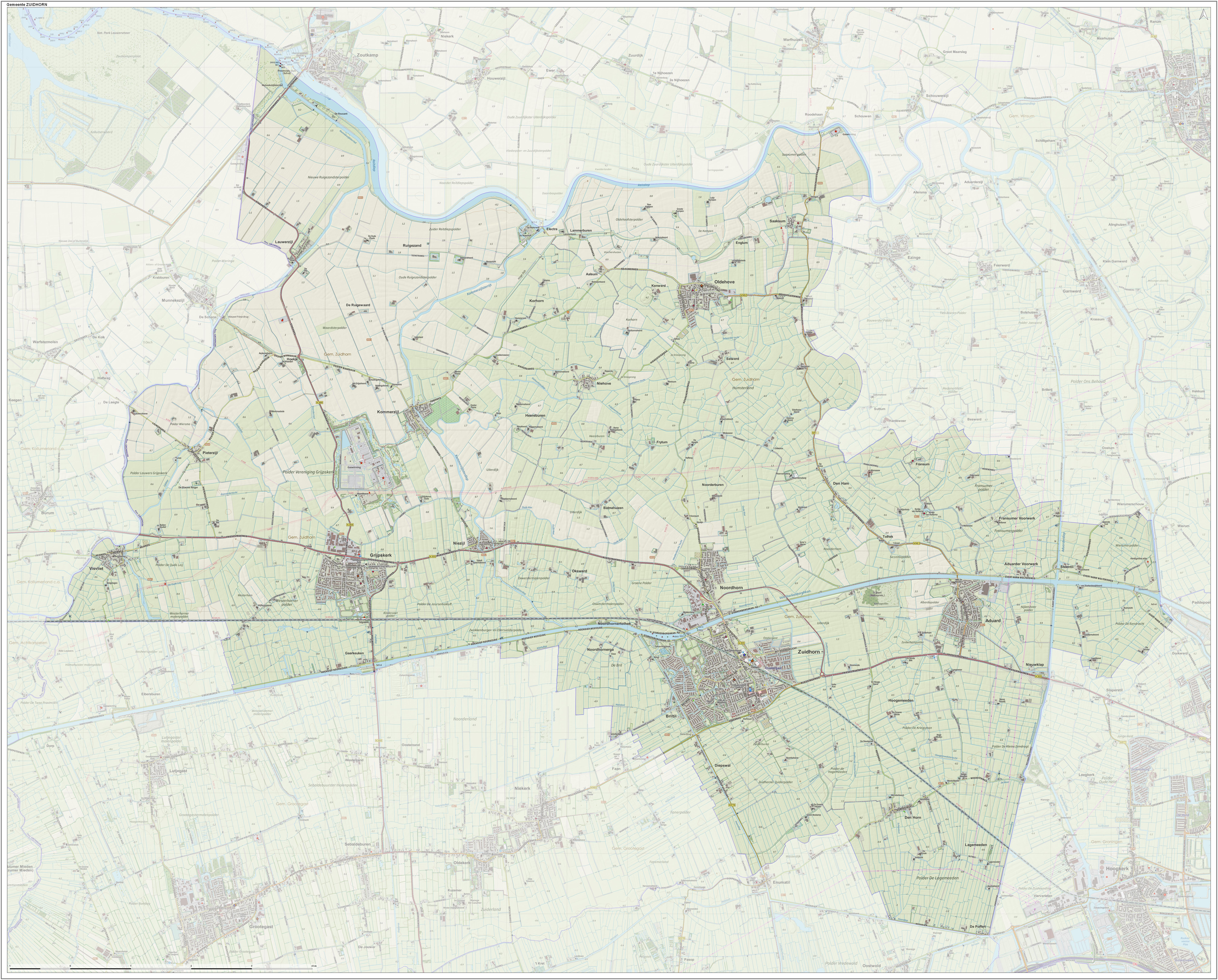
Dutch Topographic map of Zuidhorn, Sept. 2014

The former municipality of Zuidhorn comprised the following population centres:

Aalsum, Aduard, Balmahuizen, Barnwerd, Briltil, De Kampen, De Poffert, De Ruigewaard, Den Ham, Den Horn, Diepswal, Electra, Englum, Fransum, Frytum, Gaaikemadijk, Gaaikemaweer, Gaarkeuken, Grijpskerk, Heereburen, Hoekje, Hoogemeeden, Humsterland, Ikum, Kenwerd, Kommerzijl, Korhorn, Lagemeeden, Lammerburen, Lauwerzijl, Niehove, Nieuwklap, Niezijl, Noorderburen, Noordhorn, Noordhornerga, Noordhornertolhek, Okswerd, Oldehove, Pama, Pieterzijl, Ruigezand, Saaksum, Selwerd, Spanjaardsdijk, Steentil, Visvliet, Wierumerschouw and Zuidhorn.

== Notable people ==
- John William, Baron Ripperda (1684–1737) political adventurer and Spanish Prime Minister
- Marten Douwes Teenstra (1795-1864) writer and traveller in South Africa and the Dutch East Indies
- Albert Egges van Giffen (1884–1973) archaeologist, specialised in hunebeds and tumuli
- Jan Wiegers (1893-1959) expressionist painter
- Roelof Kruisinga (1922–2012) politician and physician
- Bert Groen (born 1945) corporate director, former civil servant and politician
- Paul Blokhuis (born 1963) politician
- Sietze de Vries (born 1973) organist

=== Sport ===
- Matthijs Vellenga (born 1977) rower, medallist at the 2004 Summer Olympics
- David Kuiper (born 1980) rower
- Hieke Zijlstra (born 1981) footballer
