= Lauwerzijl =

Lauwerzijl Lauwerziel or 't Sieltje (Gronings)
- Village
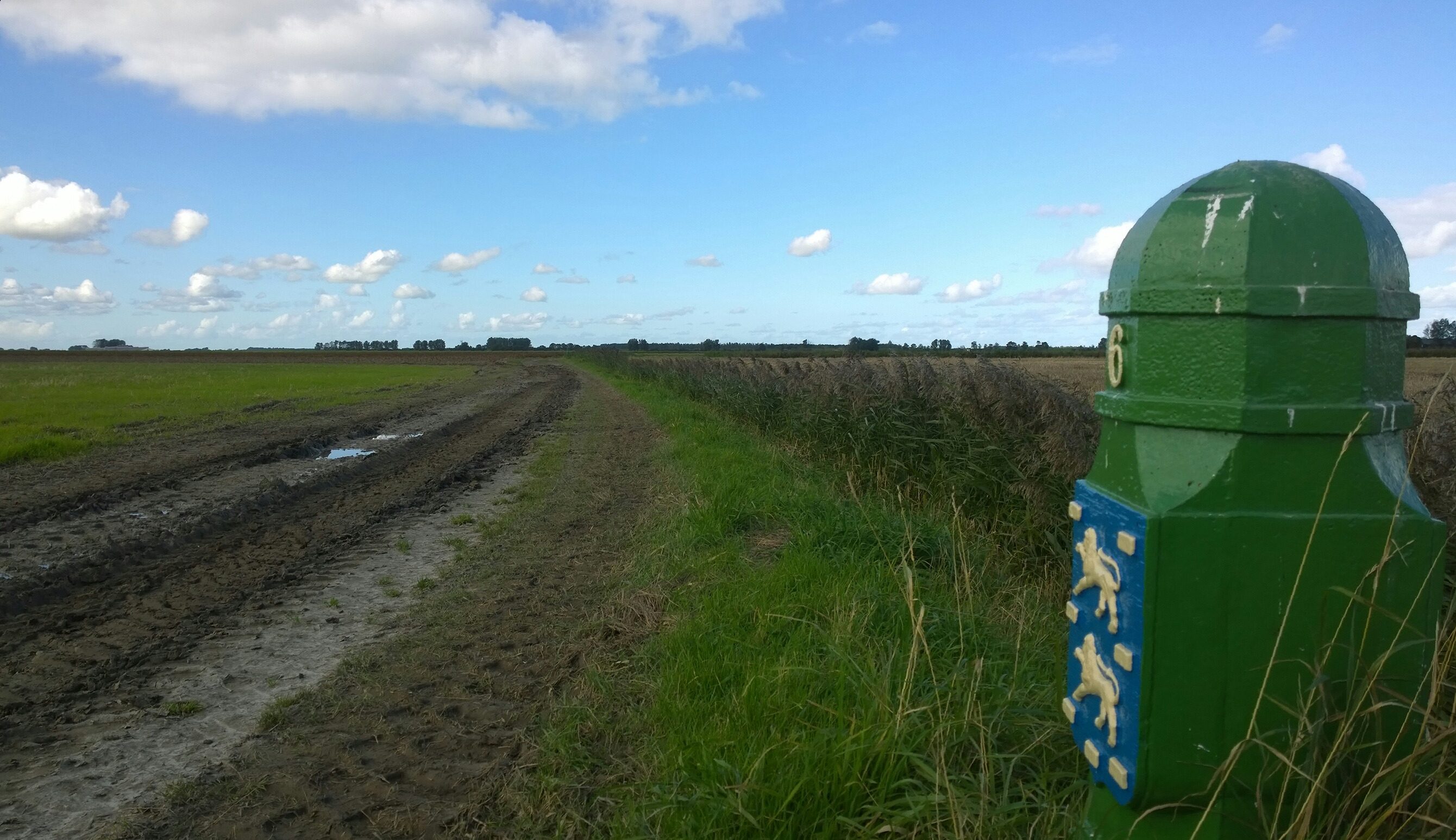
- Boundary marker near Lauwerzijl

- Location in the province of Groningen in the Netherlands Lauwerzijl (Netherlands)
- Coordinates: 53°19′N 6°18′E
- Country: Netherlands
- Province: Groningen
- Municipality: Westerkwartier
- Elevation: 1.5 m (4.9 ft)

Population (2021)
  - Total: 195
- Time zone: UTC+1 (CET)
  - Summer (DST): UTC+2 (CEST)
- Postcode: 9885
- Area code: 0594

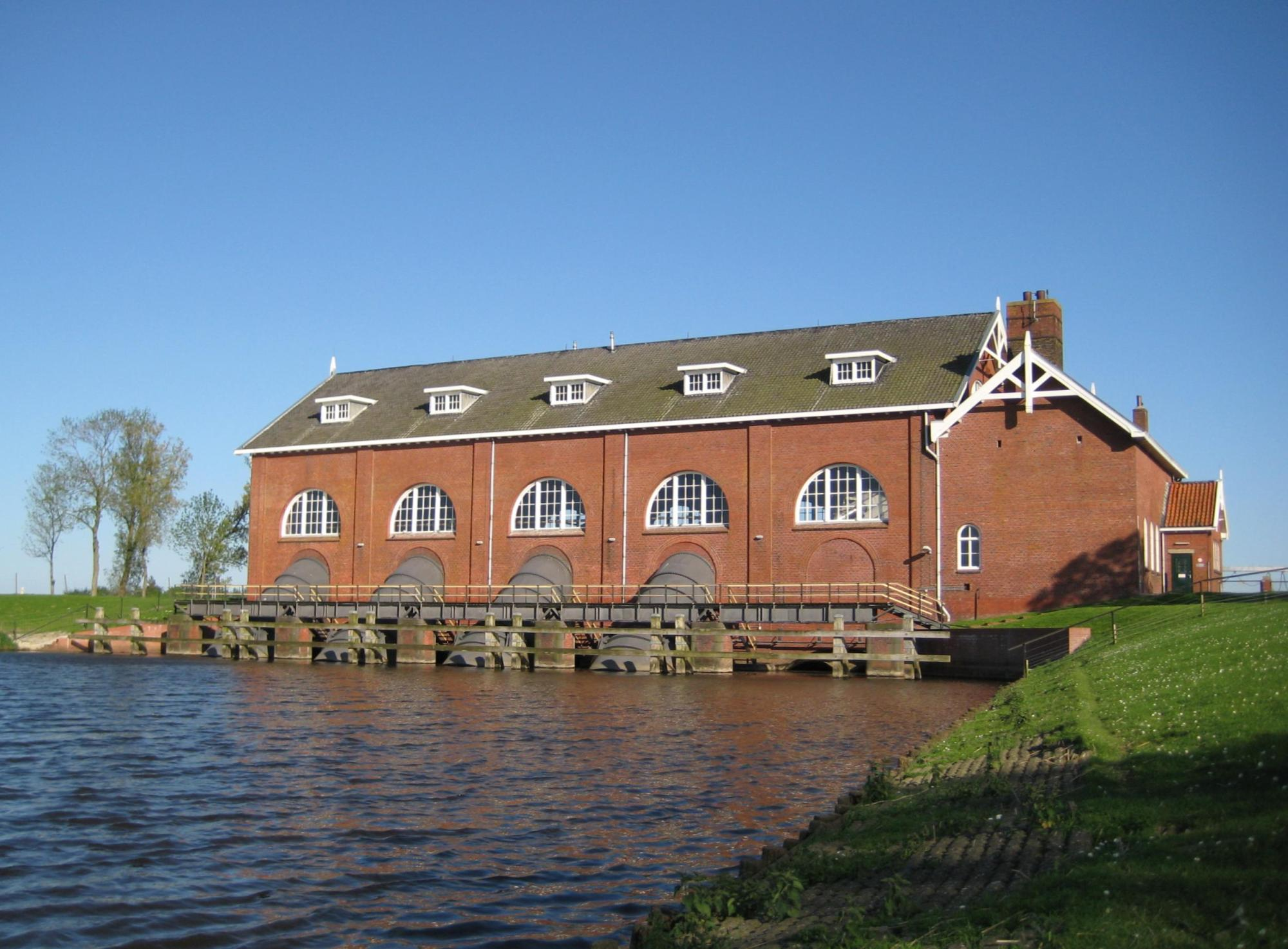
The Waterwolf, a pumping station near Lauwerzijl

Lauwerzijl (Dutch pronunciation: [ˌlʌuərˈzɛil]; Gronings: Lauwerziel or 't Sieltje) is a village in the municipality of Westerkwartier in the province of Groningen in the Netherlands. As of 2021, it had a population of 195. Until 1990 the village belonged to the former municipality of Oldehove, then until 2019 to the former municipality of Zuidhorn.

== Geography ==
A connecting canal called the Munnekezijlsterried flows along Lauwerzijl. This water flows into the Lauwersmeer at the so-called Friesche sluis southwest of Zoutkamp, where it flows into the Zoutkamperril. There the water of the river Lauwers flows together with that of the Reitdiep.

The name Lauwerzijl indicates that the village originated near a lock in the Lauwers. This lock was built in 1754 when the Munnekezijlsterried was moved and was demolished sometime around 1878 when the Polder Wieringa and Nieuwe Ruigezandsterpolder were diked in with the dike between Nittershoek and Zoutkamp. Around 1878, a wooden bridge was also placed 100 meters to the west of the demolished lock. Sometime in the 20th century, it was replaced by a stone bridge. The current bridge dates from 2004.

== History ==
In 1877, the area of the former municipality of Oldehove was enlarged by reclamation. This polder was named Nieuwe Ruigezandsterpolder. The city of Groningen operated seven farms in this polder ('plaats 1' to 'plaats 7'; see also farm De Pol).

Five of these farms are located on the Stadsweg, the same road on which Lauwerzijl originated. In 1879 the first house was built right next to the lock. This house was also a shop, café, and passage with outbuildings. Because there was great demand for agricultural workers on the city farms, the city of Groningen made cheap land available to stimulate housing. With the arrival of working-class families, the demand for a school also grew. This school was finally built in 1922.

In 1929 the village was visited by Queen Wilhelmina. Land reclamation was also done in what is now called the Lauwersmeer, then called Lauwerszee. This area is located 1.5 kilometers north of Lauwerzijl. The staircase that was built to facilitate the climb to the top of the dike is still there and bears the name Koninginnetrap ('Queen's staircase').

Over the years, the village has not grown much. The school (CBS 't Sielje) was closed in 1999 and merged with CBS De Regenboog from Grijpskerk, after the number of pupils had been below 30 for years. There is an association for village interests that maintains contacts with the municipality, province, and other bodies that concern the quality of life in the village.
