= Jan Geersing =

Dutch politician (1940–2021)

- Born: 30 July 1940; Leutingewolde, Netherlands
- Died: 17 February 2021 (aged 80); Zuidhorn, Netherlands
- Occupations: politician, educator school administrator

Jan Geersing (30 July 1940 – 17 February 2021) was a Dutch politician of the Reformed Political League and later Christian Union, who served as a member of the Friesland Parliament and as Mayor of Ferwerderadeel.

== Early life and career in education ==
Jan Geersing was born in the village of Leutingewolde, Drenthe to a mother from Friesland and a father from Drenthe. He spoke West Frisian and Dutch from early childhood and studied Latin and Ancient Greek at the University of Groningen. In the early 1960s, he was a teacher of classical languages at Grotius College Heerlen, the only Protestant high school in Limburg, Netherlands. In 1966, he became a teacher of classical languages at the Leeuwarden Christian Gymnasium, Christelijk Gymnasium Beyers Naudé. In 1981, he became its vice principal.

== Political career ==
=== Counselor and Friesland Parliament Member ===
Geersing became politically active, initially alongside his career in education. He was chairman of the council in Ferwerderadeel. He also became chairman of the Reformed Political League (GPV) Friesland Provincial Contact Council, the body that connected local and provincial politics.

In 1978 and 1982, he was ranked 5th and 6th respectively on the provincial state elections list of the GPV in Friesland. In the 1978 elections, Gerrit Gerritsma, until then the only GPV Provincial Council Member in Friesland, was not re-elected. In 1982 the GPV member Pieter Cnossen became a one-man faction in the States. After Cnossen stepped down prematurely in 1984, the GPV candidates who had been above Geersing on the list renounced becoming parliament members, paving the way for Geersing to become a Member of the Provincial Council of Friesland.

=== Mayor of Ferwerderadeel ===
On August 1, 1988, Geersing became the Mayor of Ferwerderadeel. At that time there was only one additional GPV mayor in the Netherlands (Bert Groen, who was the mayor of Bunschoten). In Ferwerderadeel, Geersing became the first GPV mayor after 80 years of mayors of the Christian Democratic Appeal and its predecessors. While being mayor of Ferwerderadeel, Geersing was also a longtime chairman of the Fryske Akademy member of the Elfstedentocht Commission, and chairman of the regional garbage processing plant. In 1998, the chain of office and hammer of the mayor were stolen were by an angry houseboat owner. In 2000, Geersing and his peers in Groningen and Friesland prepared for brothels leaving the cities and entering rural space. In August 2001 he retired as mayor of Ferwerderadeel.

== Later life, recognition and death ==
Geersing was awarded a royal decoration and a pin of merit of the municipality of Ferwerderadiel.

In his retirement, Geesink edited Code: HC1, a book by Sijbren van der Velde on Dutch World War II resistance.

Geersing died in Zuidhorn on 17 February 2021, aged 80.
