= Pieterzijl =

Pieterzijl Pieterziel (Gronings)
- Village
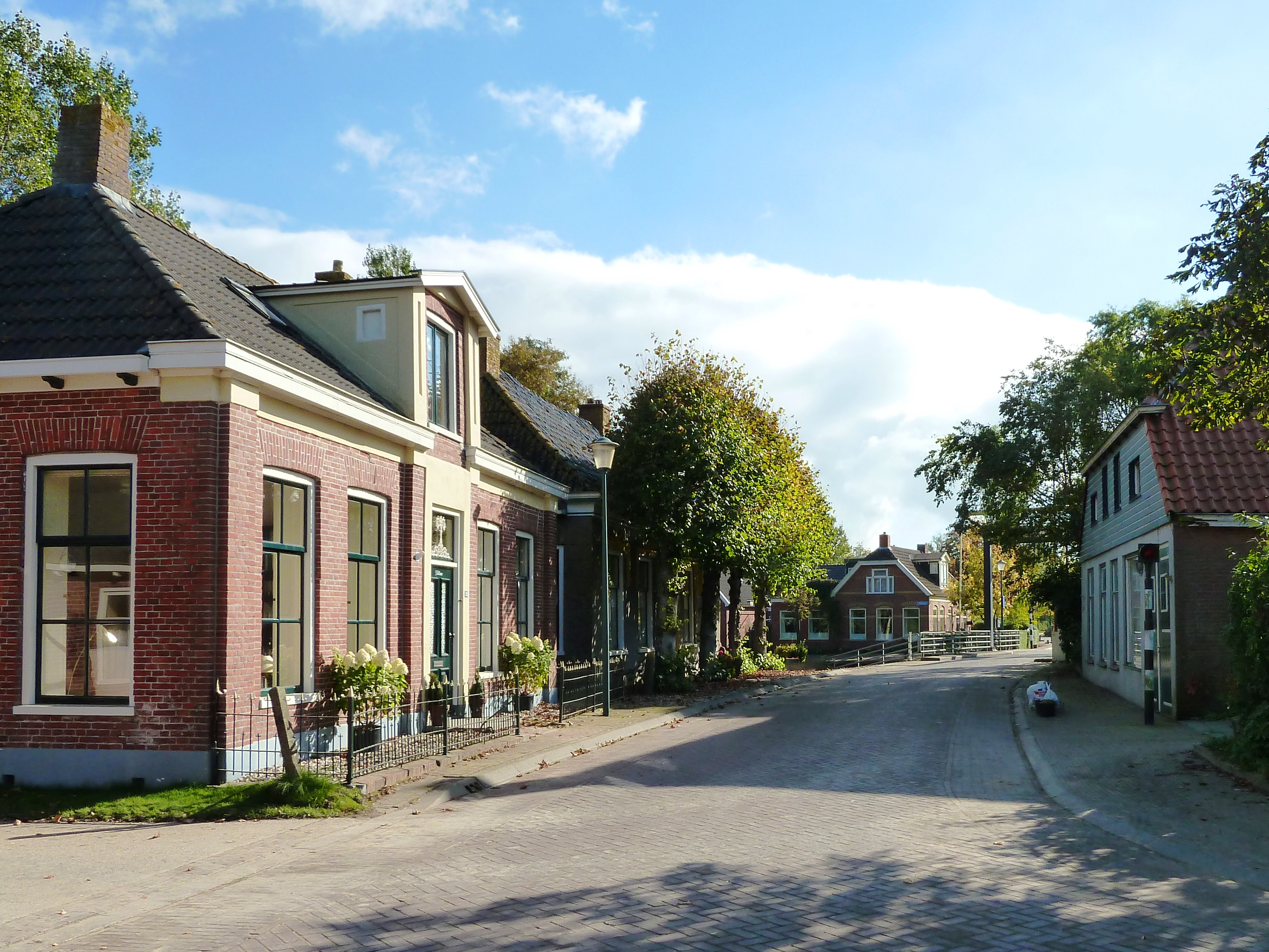
- Street in Pieterzijl

- Location in the province of Groningen in the Netherlands Pieterzijl (Netherlands)
- Coordinates: 53°17′N 6°16′E
- Country: Netherlands
- Province: Groningen
- Municipality: Westerkwartier
- Elevation: 1.2 m (3.9 ft)

Population (2021)
  - Total: 170
- Time zone: UTC+1 (CET)
  - Summer (DST): UTC+2 (CEST)
- Postcode: 9844
- Area code: 0594

Pieterzijl (Dutch: [ˈpitərˌzɛil]; Gronings: Pieterziel; West Frisian: Pitersyl) is a village in the municipality of Westerkwartier in the province of Groningen in the Netherlands. As of 2021, it had a population of 170.

== History ==
The Ruigewaard was diked at the beginning of the 15th century. In 1440, monks from the Jerusalem monastery in Gerkesklooster built a zijl (= lock), which served as a discharge sluice for the new Zijldiep, a canalized connection in the Lauwers, the old course of which runs around the village along the hamlet of De Leegte. This is the 'Old Lauwers'. The monks apparently named the lock after Saint Peter.

According to a document from around 1476, the dike was built an die werve by Lambers huse ('at the shipyard at Lambers' house'). This was perhaps a voorwerk (monastery farm) of Gerkesklooster, just like its counterpart in Visvliet, the Bartoleshus. At the same time, the lock at Munnekezijl was completed more northerly. The lock appeared in 1520 as Peters- offte Lambertsiil and was possibly still present in 1558. Later, the lock was replaced by a bridge. A settlement arose around the former dike that ecclesiastically fell under Visvliet.

After 1580, the former monastery property with the associated heerlijkheid was seized by the province of Friesland, which from then on held sway over Visvliet and Pieterzijl. In 1637, the manor and inheritance of Visvliet were sold to the region of Stad en Lande.

Meanwhile, Pieterzijl developed into a village with trade and industry that served the surrounding farms.

In the second half of the 20th century, agriculture declined in importance and activity disappeared from the village. The last store disappeared at the end of the 1980s. The HD forge moved to Bedum in 1996 and the first women's campsite in the Netherlands was founded there in 1985 (Mevrouw Zelf/De Hooimijt; the site had already been purchased from a farmer in 1983), but in September 1989 the house burned down, after which the site was sold in 1991. In 2008, the current (regular) campsite De Blauwe Reiger ('The Blue Heron') was established there.

=== Mennonites ===
The village was already an attraction for Mennonites (doopsgezinden) from the Westerkwartier in the 16th century, but due to the influence of the Reformed Church, which objected to Mennonite doctrine, it took until 1664 (or 1663) before a house of worship was built. However, this was not favored by the local grietman and the classis of the Dutch Reformed Church, who soon had the vermaanhuis closed again. The congregation then held meetings in a workers' house (possibly the same house). The community belonged to the moderate Humsterland Society.

A second vermaanhuis was built in 1733. The following year they broke with the tradition of praying alone in silence and the preacher started saying the prayer aloud. In 1815 a new vermaanhuis was built on the third plot from the bridge east of the road to Warfstermolen. In the early 1880s, however, the problem arose that preachers no longer wanted to come to the village, which was then difficult to reach. In 1887, a new parsonage was therefore built in the more centrally located Grijpskerk, where many congregants lived. The old parsonage was sold. Three years later it was decided to move Pieterzijl's vermaanhuis to the garden of the Grijpskerk parsonage, which happened; the church was demolished stone by stone in March 1892, moved and rebuilt in October 1892 in Grijpskerk.

== Buildings ==
=== Schools and Reformed church ===
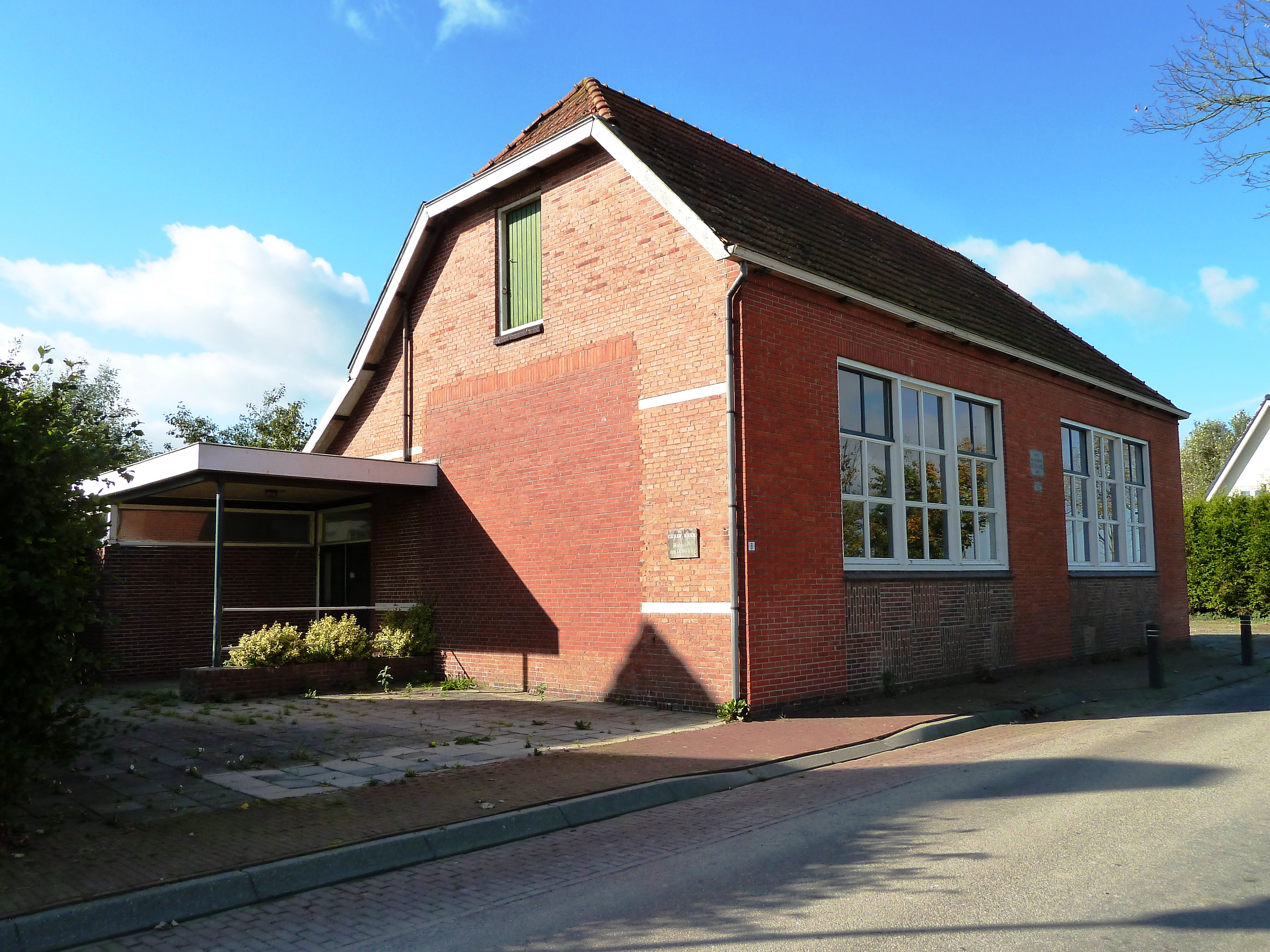
The Christian primary school and later Reformed church, currently in use as a house

Perhaps at the beginning of the 19th century, a public primary school was founded in the village, which was renovated in 1857 and, after the establishment of the Christian school, was closed in 1925 (as of January 1) due to a lack of students. The building has since been demolished.

In 1910 it was decided to build a Christian primary school in Pieterzijl, which was built in 1913. The building was renovated in 1952, but at the end of the 1950s, it became clear that a new school was needed, which was put into use in 1964. The old building was then used by the new Reformed community of Pieterzijl, which emerged from that of Burum in 1963. The building was closed in 2010. The newer primary school merged with that of Visvliet in 1983 and has since been converted into village hall De Wending ('The Twist'). The building is now only used for toddlers. The other students go to a primary school in Grijpskerk.

=== Mills ===
Since 1835, there was a tower mill (a grist and husking mill) along the Diepswal road, which was demolished in 1936, but of which the miller's house and storage remains (Brugstraat 11). North of the village, a polder mill (grondzeiler) was built in 1904 on the Zijldiep for the drainage of the polder behind it. This had a sail of 25 meters which was later increased to 28 meters; the largest in the province of Groningen. In 1916 the mill was fitted with an electric mill and in 1938 a pumping station was built next to the mill. During the opening, a number of water board members were present at the bottom of the mill, when toxic gases were released from the murky water and all became unconscious except for one who managed to open the door in time, preventing worse. The mill was then shuttered to prevent this in the future. However, after the installation of the pumping station, the mill was also neglected and eventually demolished in 1955. The pumping station is still there.

=== Farm ===
At the southern end of the village, at Pieterzijlsterweg 5, was the monumental head-neck-rump farm De Peterswarf with coach house and barns from about 1875. This was replaced in 2013 by a new-build barn/shed.

== Gallery ==
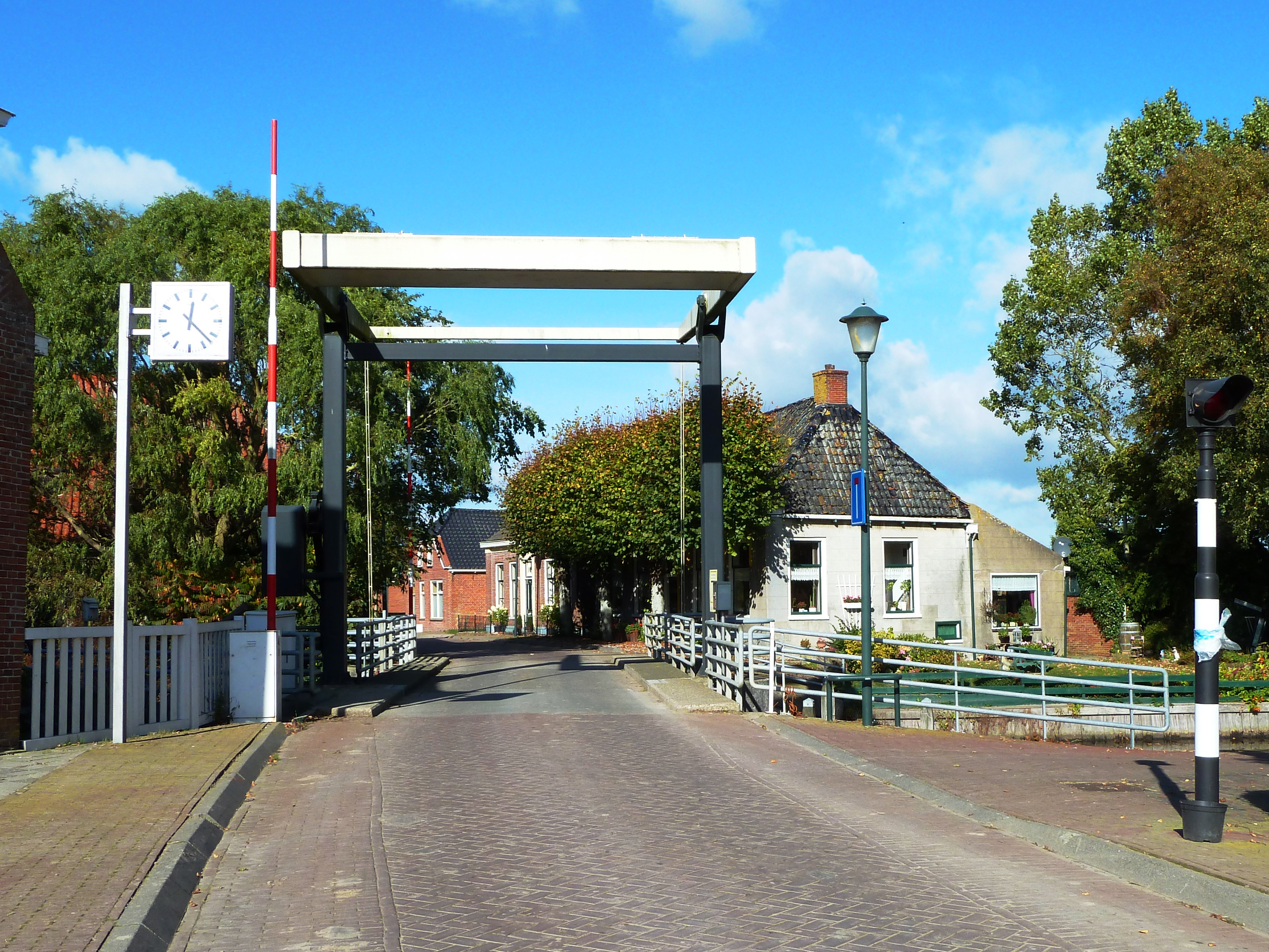
Bridge from up close

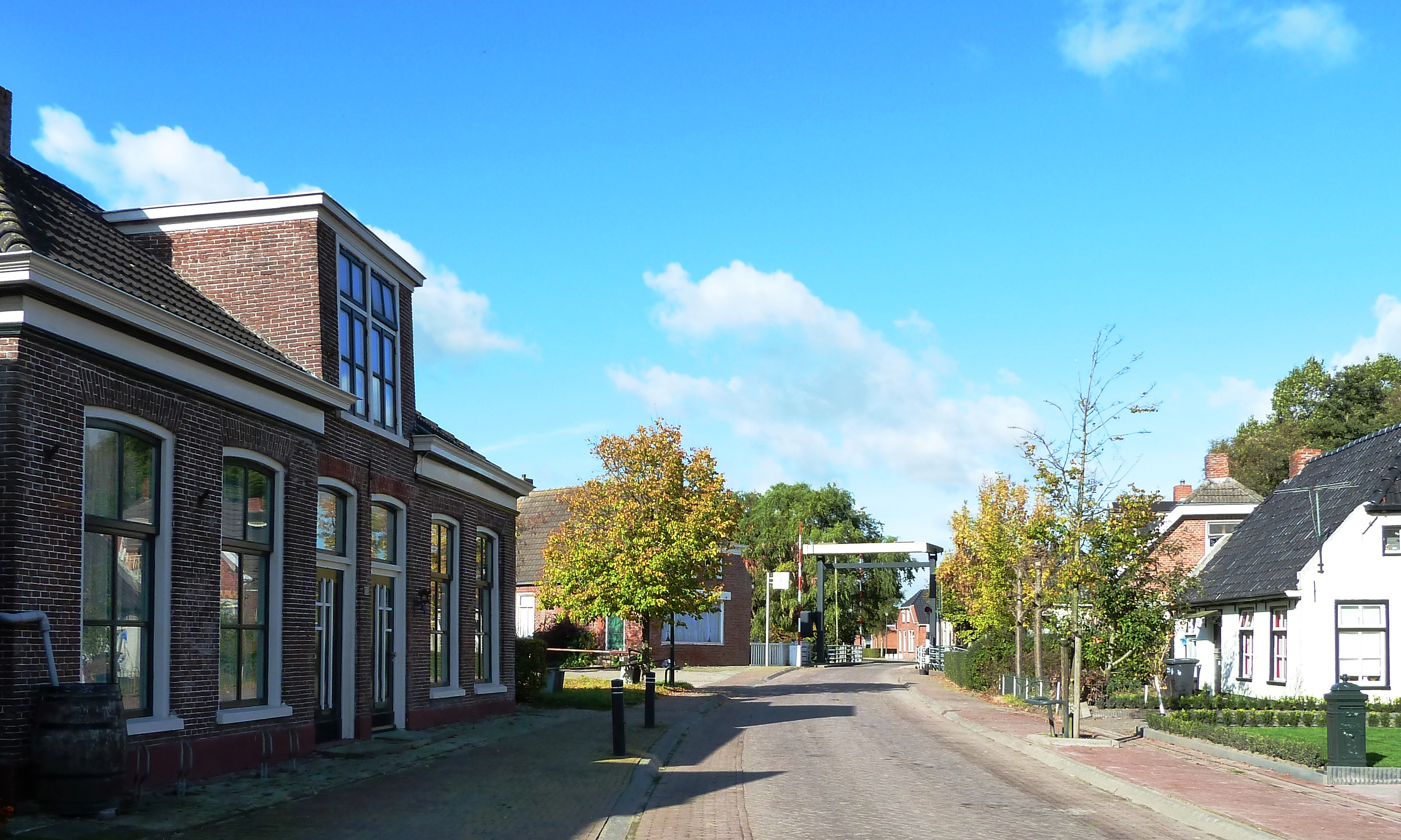
Bridge with a house on the left where a café used to be located

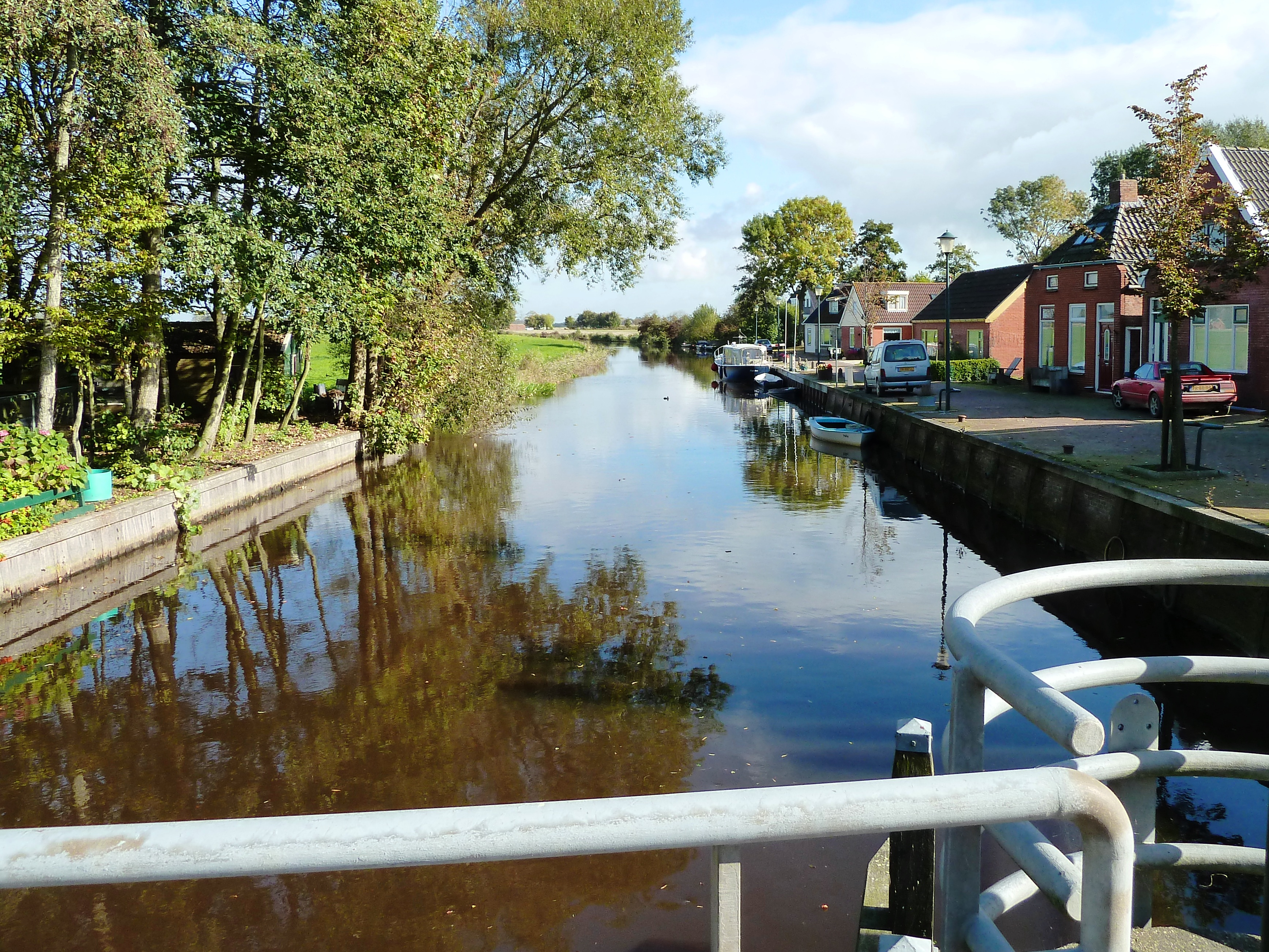
View from the bridge over the Zijldiep along the Diepswal

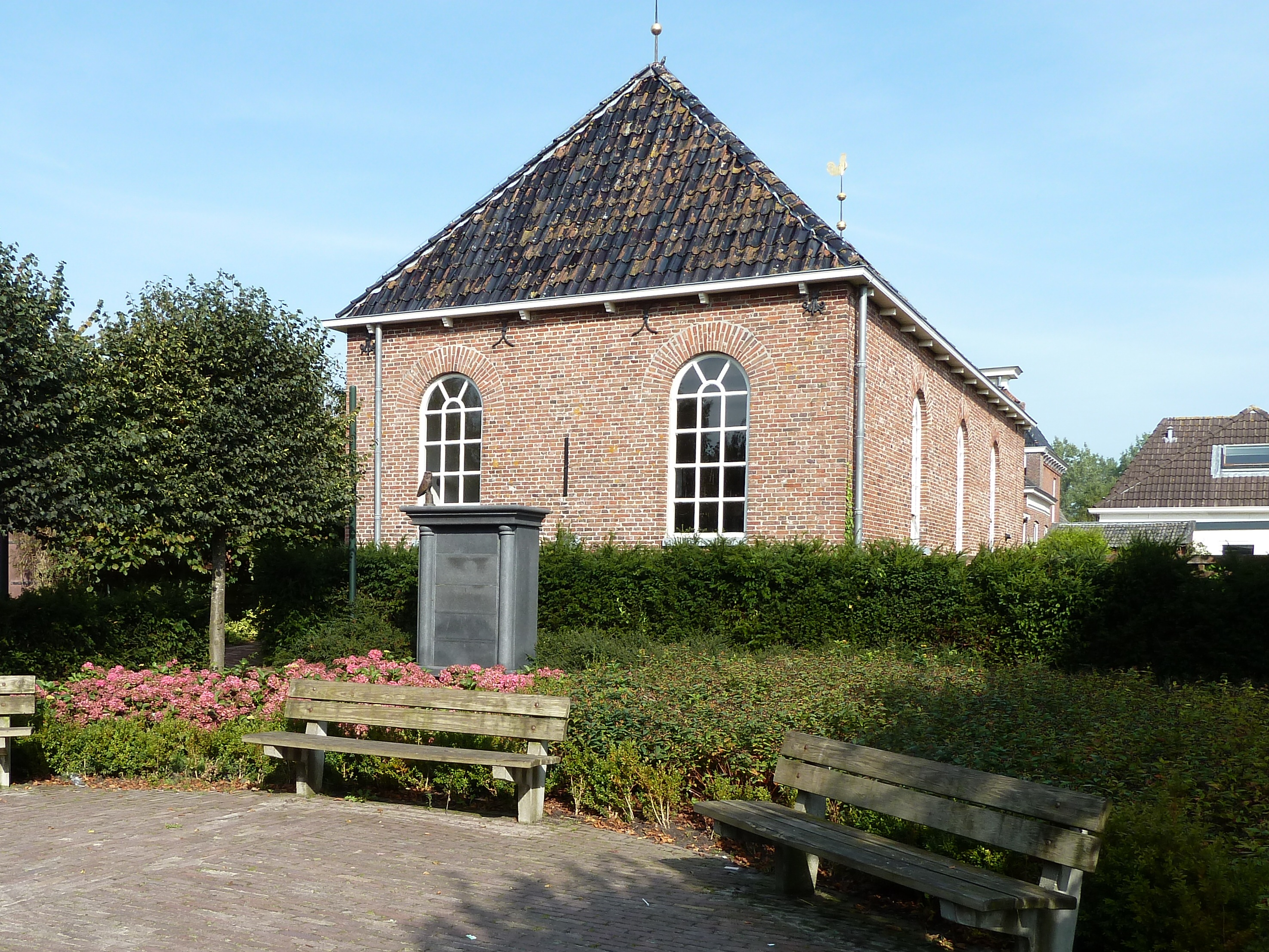
Mennonite vermaanhuis, which has been in Grijpskerk since 1892
