= Visvliet =

- Village
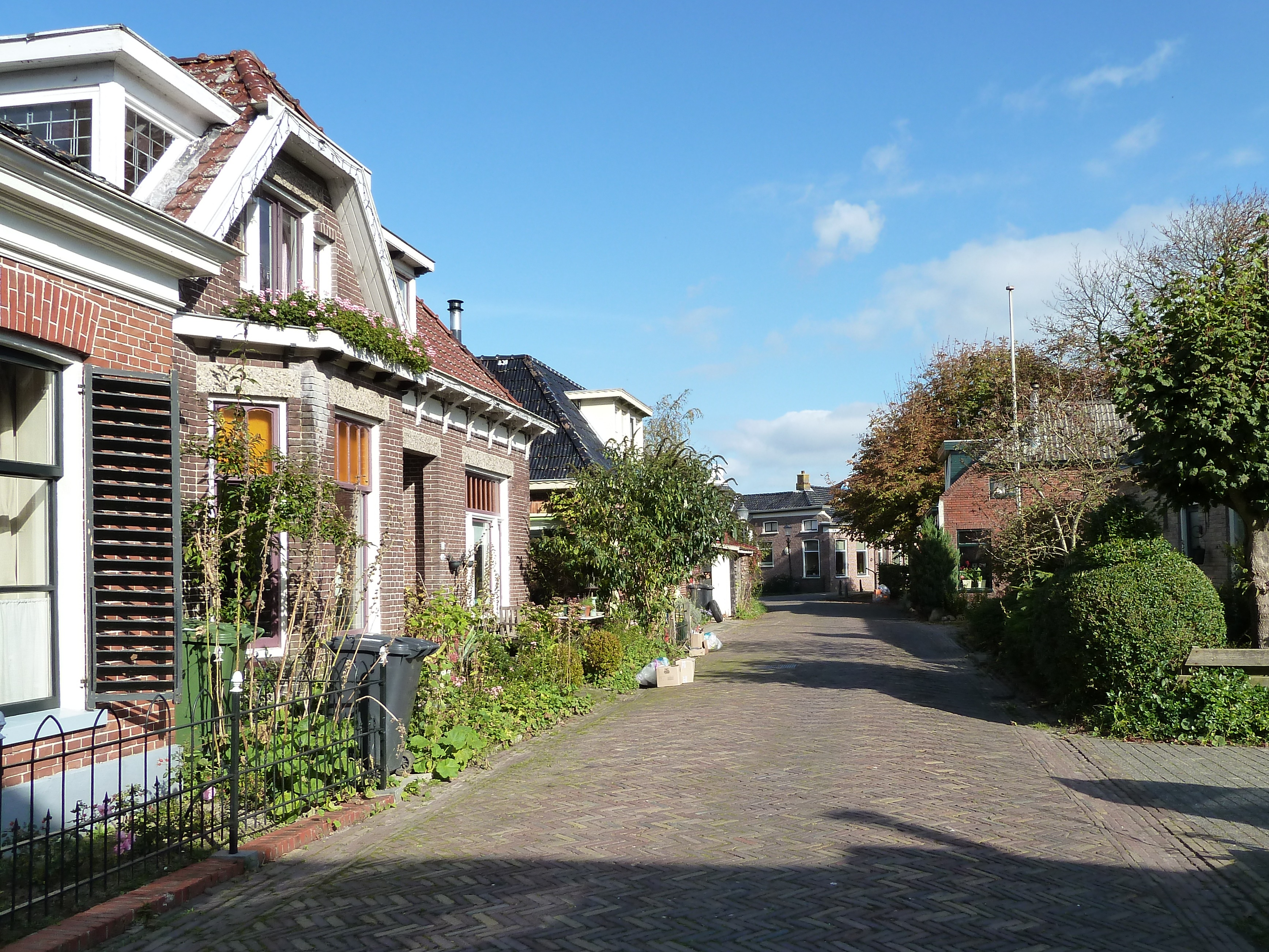
- Eise Eisingastraat, Visvliet

- Coat of arms

- Location in province of Groningen in the Netherlands Visvliet (Netherlands)
- Coordinates: 53.26503°N 6.24736°E
- Country: Netherlands
- Province: Groningen
- Municipality: Westerkwartier

Area
  - Total: 0.33 km^{2} (0.13 sq mi)
- Elevation: 1 m (3.3 ft)

Population (2021)
  - Total: 280
  - Density: 850/km^{2} (2,200/sq mi)
- Time zone: UTC+1 (CET)
  - Summer (DST): UTC+2 (CEST)
- Postal code: 9845
- Dialing code: 0594
- Website: visvliet.com

Visvliet is a village in the Dutch province of Groningen. It is part of the municipality of Westerkwartier, and is located near the river Lauwers, the border between Friesland and Groningen.

== History ==
In 734, the Battle of the Boarn was fought between the Frisians and the Franks, and the river Lauwers became the border between the Province of Friesland and Groningen. Visvliet is located to the east of the river and part of Groningen. It was first mentioned in 1378, and was a fishing village. It was established as an outpost of monastery Jeruzalem in Gerkesklooster. The name means "water with fish".

During the Dutch Revolt, Groningen sided with Spain. In 1581, Friesland, who sided with the Dutch Republic, attacked and conquered the village in the Battle of Visvliet. The heerlijkheid Visvliet was established, and a grietman (combination of mayor and judge) was appointed for the village. On 22 July 1594, after the Siege of Groningen, Groningen was forced to side with Dutch Republic. Even though Friesland never annexed Visvliet, it was de facto in control of the heerlijkheid. In 1637, it was bought by the province of Groningen.

Due to its presence near the border, a toll was established. In 1748, there was a riot and the toll was taken. In 1795, the toll was eliminated. In 1811, Visvliet became part of the municipality of Grijpskerk. From the 18th until 20th century, the economy was mainly based on brickworks and roof tile factories. In 1840, it was home to 485 people. In 2019, it became part of the municipality of Westerkwartier.

== Road ==
In 1842, a main road from Leeuwarden to Groningen via Visvliet was constructed (nowadays: N355). During the 1960s, it was scheduled to become a motorway. In 1965, Visvliet was bypassed, and a 400 metres (1,300 ft) section of 2x2 road with hard shoulders was laid near the village. Rijkswaterstaat also purchased all the land necessary for the upgrade of the entire road. In 1975, the motorway plans were cancelled in favour of a route via Drachten. The 400 metre section remained near Visvliet until 2006 when it was finally downgraded to a single road.

== Visvliet railway station ==
In 1892, a railway station opened at Visvliet on the Harlingen–Nieuweschans railway. During the 1970s and 1980s, all railway stations in the Netherlands were serviced at least once an hour except for Visvliet which was serviced once every two hours. The building was reasonably large, and set in an endless landscape seemingly without human habitation, because the village of Visvliet was hidden from view by a forest. The building was torn down in 1982, the station closed in 1991, and in 1996, the platform which was the last trace of the railway station was demolished.

Bob den Uyl wrote Visvliet bestaat namelijk niet (Visvliet does not exist) about the railway station, Den Uyl and the former Visvliet station are featured in Theo Uittenbogaard's documentary Aan de Rand van Nederland (On the edge of the Netherlands).

== Gallery ==
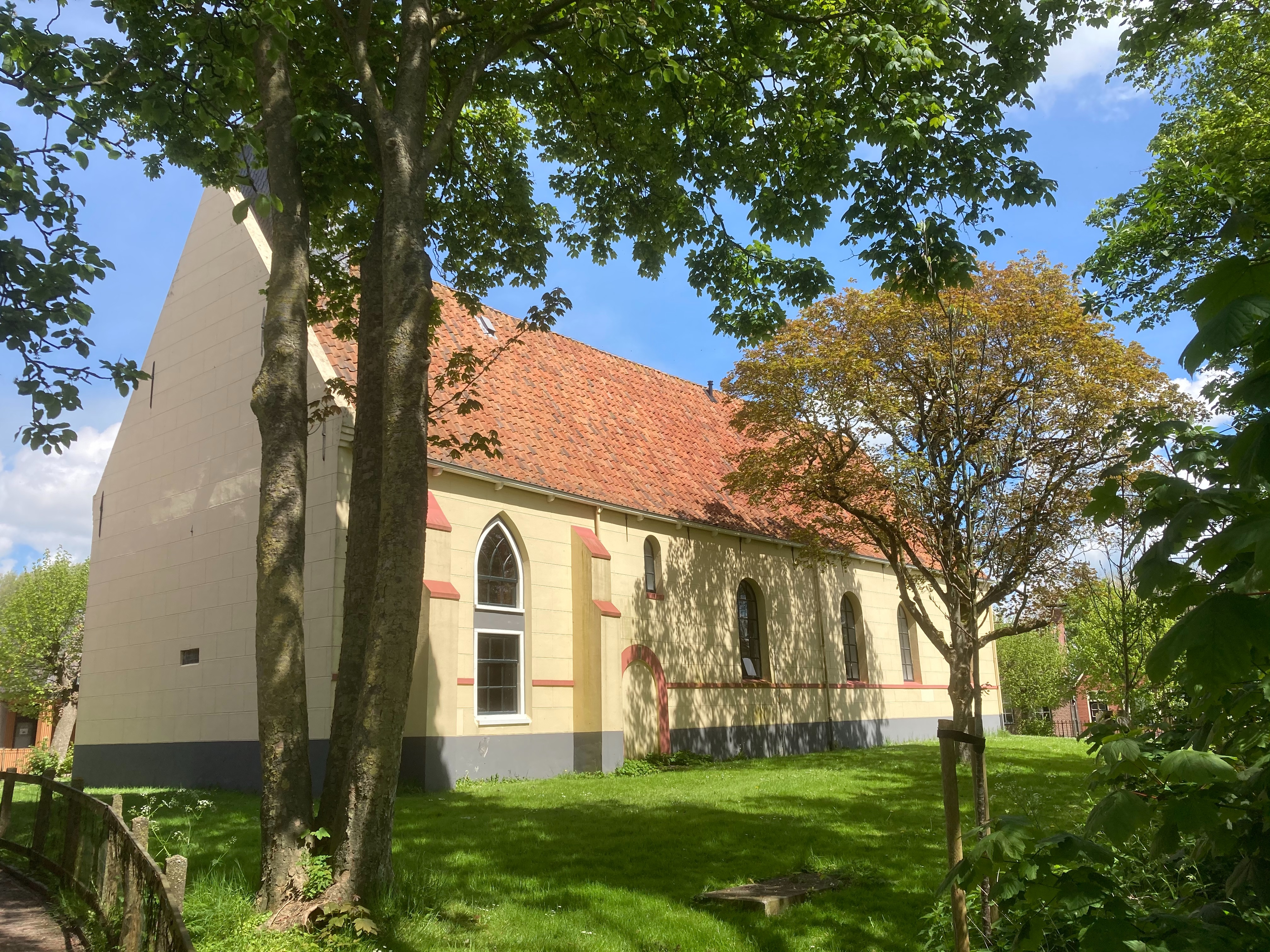
The church of Visvliet

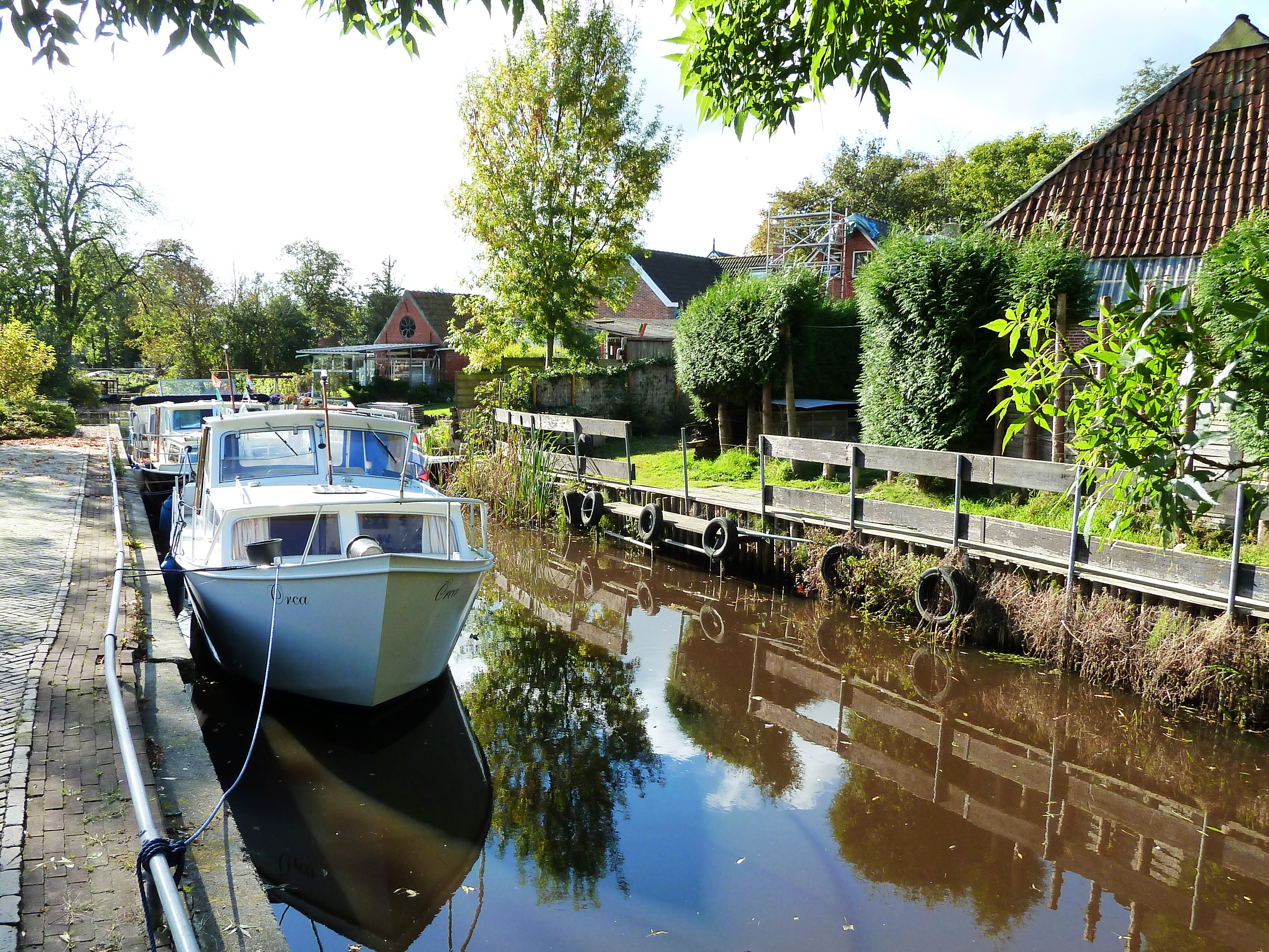
The harbour of Visvliet

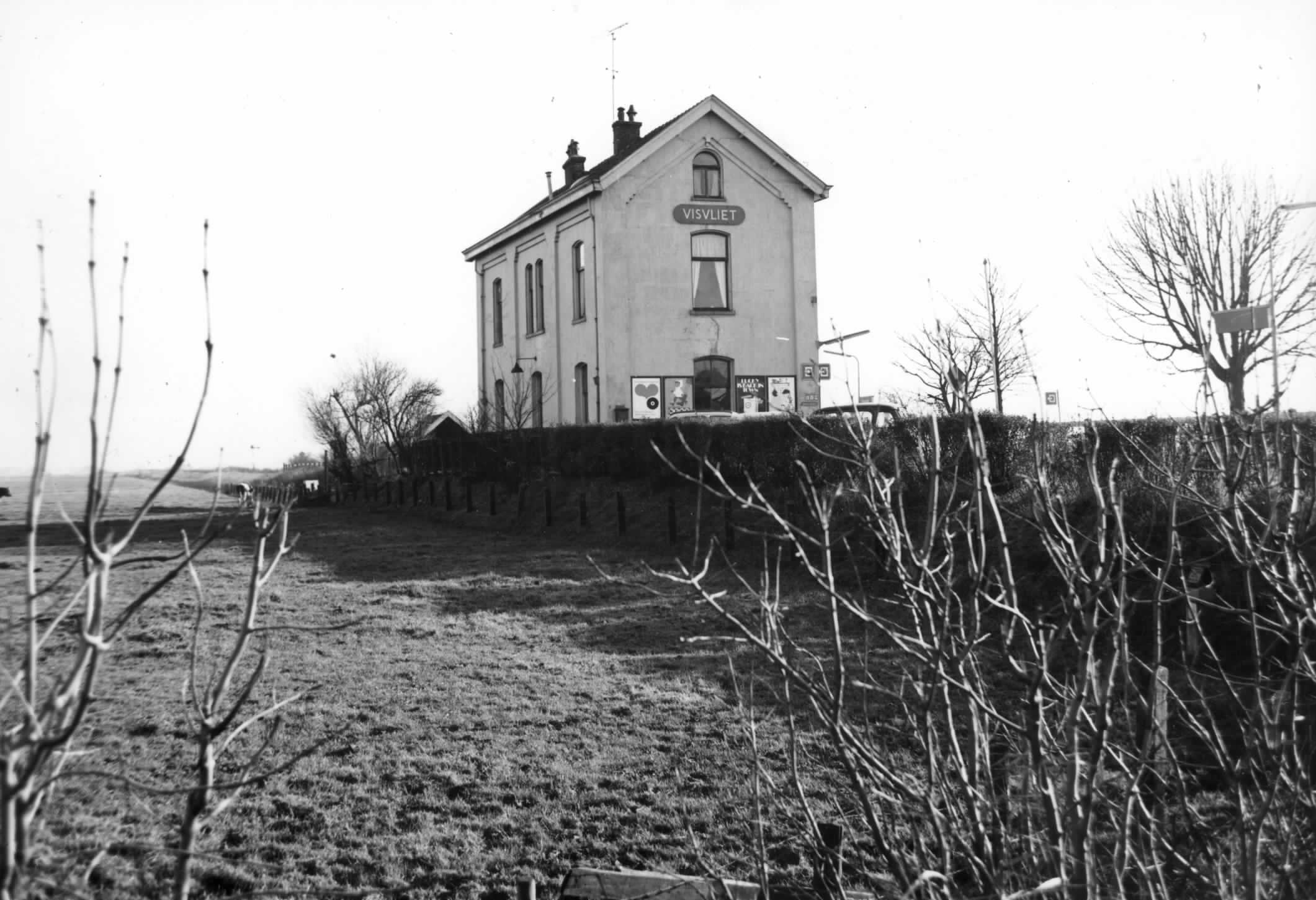
Visvliet station (1970)

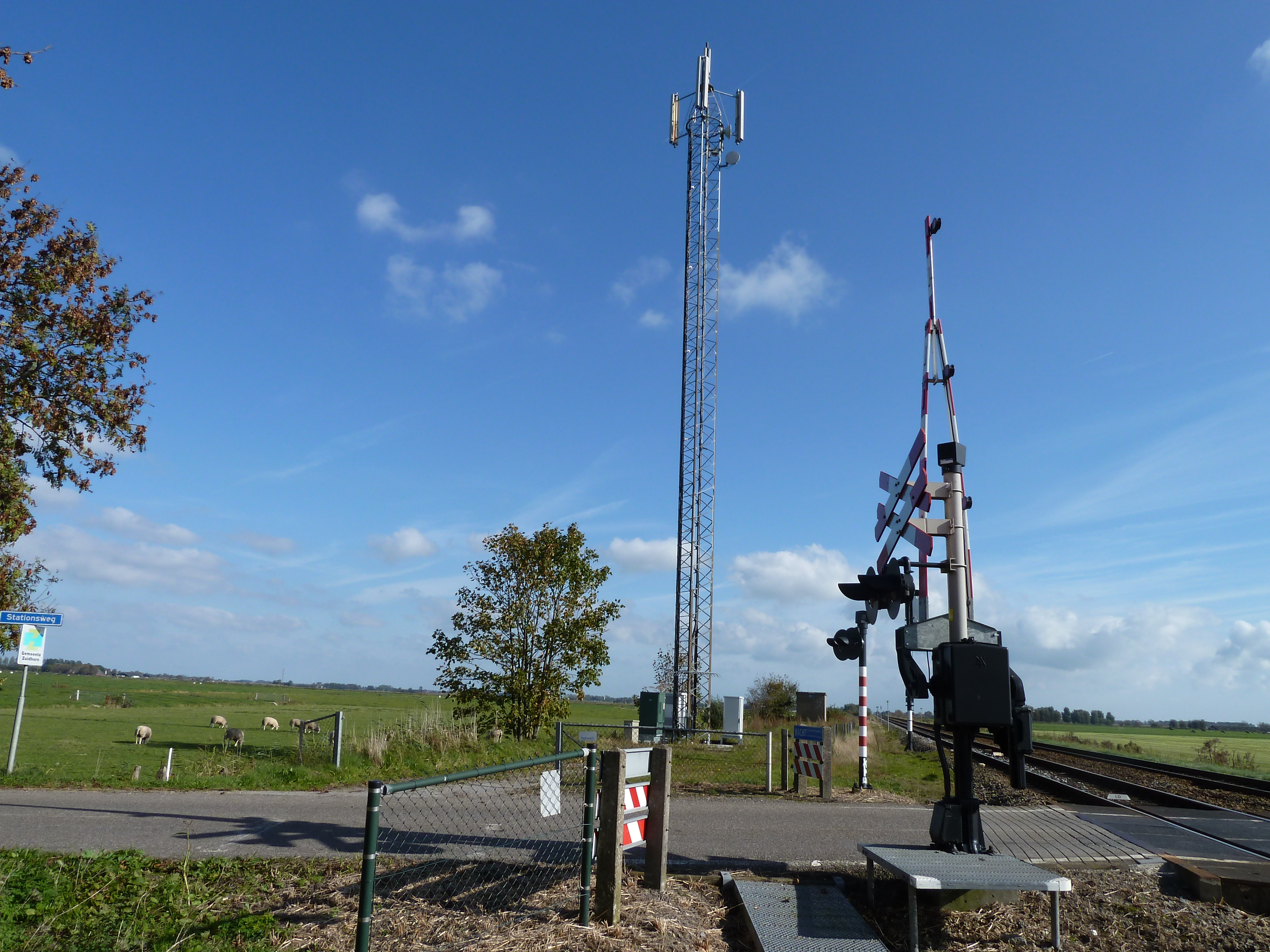
Visvliet station (2010)
