= Bert Groen =

Dutch politician (born 1945)

Lubertus Cornelis "Bert" Groen (born 28 March 1945 in Haarlem) is a Dutch corporate director and former civil servant and politician of the Reformed Political League (GPV) and his successor the ChristianUnion (ChristenUnie). From 2002 to 2003 he was a Senator for the latter.

Groen was Mayor of Oldehove and Bunschoten, and a member of the provincial parliament of Groningen.

Groen is a member of the Reformed Churches in the Netherlands (Liberated) and Knight of the Order of Orange-Nassau.
