= Oldehove, Groningen =

Oldehove
- Village
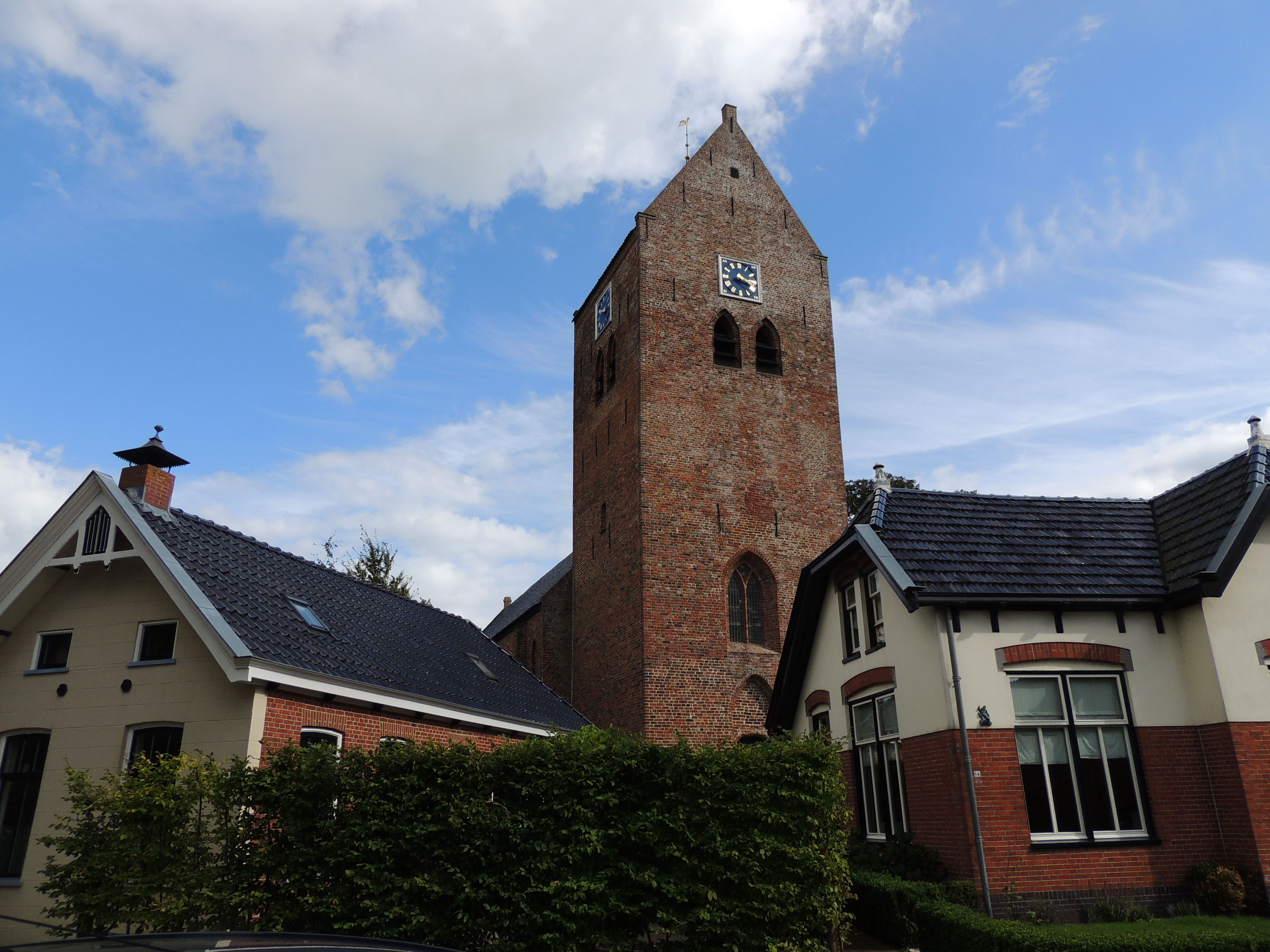
- Oldehove in 2012

- Location of Oldehove in Groningen in the Netherlands Oldehove (Netherlands)
- Coordinates: 53°18′N 6°24′E
- Country: Netherlands
- Province: Groningen
- Municipality: Westerkwartier

Area
  - Total: 0.64 km^{2} (0.25 sq mi)
- Elevation: 1.0 m (3.3 ft)

Population (2021)
  - Total: 1,325
  - Density: 2,100/km^{2} (5,400/sq mi)
- Time zone: UTC+1 (CET)
  - Summer (DST): UTC+2 (CEST)
- Postal code: 9883
- Dialing code: 0594

Oldehove is a village in the Dutch province of Groningen. It is located in the municipality of Westerkwartier, about 16 km northwest of the city of Groningen. The town has a notable skyline with two windmills and two of its three churches visible from almost every angle, the third church (De Zaaier) being obscured from vision by houses and trees because it doesn't have the traditional tower associated with most churches in similar villages.

Oldehove was a separate municipality until 1990, when it was merged with Zuidhorn. The Town Hall still exists neighboring the oldest church in the centre of town. The building is owned by private owners and functions as a home.

Oldehove is also one of the few villages in the region left with its own in-use firehouse, housing the two vehicles used by the local volunteer-firefighters.

The only way of entering the village through public transport is with bus 35 and bus 36 from Groningen and Winsum respectively.

== Gallery ==
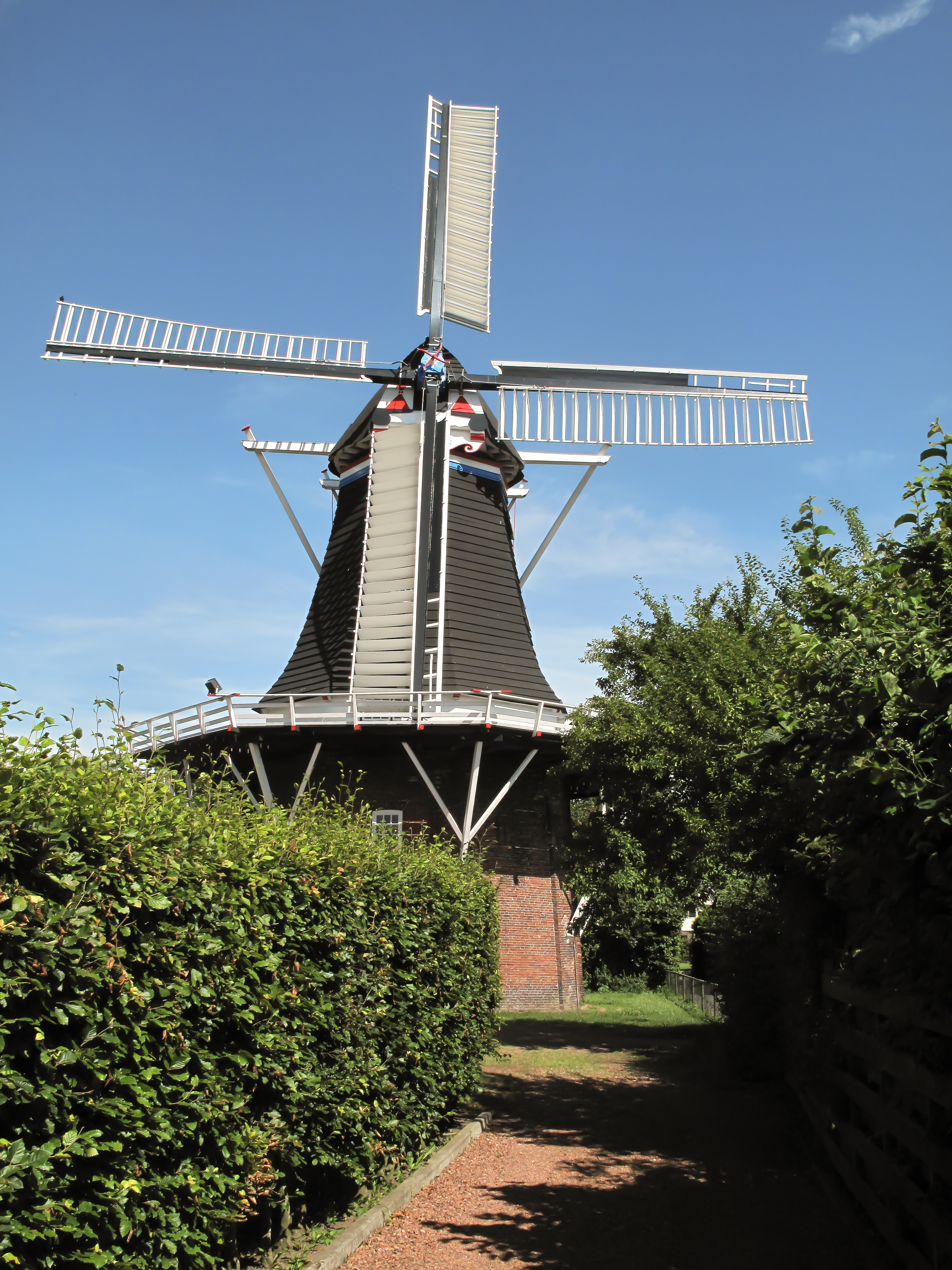
Windmill: korenmolen Aeolus

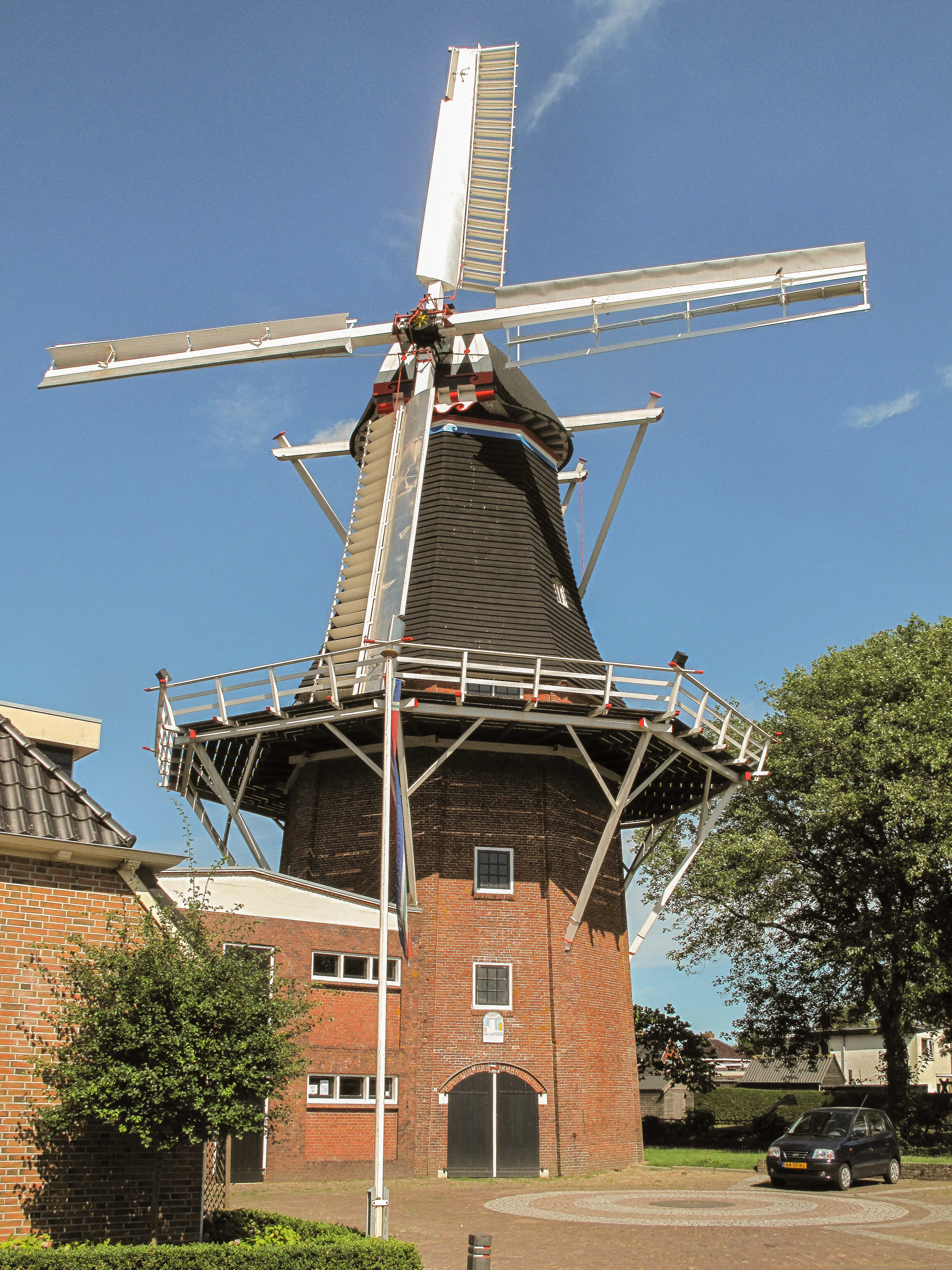
Windmill: koren-en pelmolen de Leeuw
