= Grijpskerk =

- Village
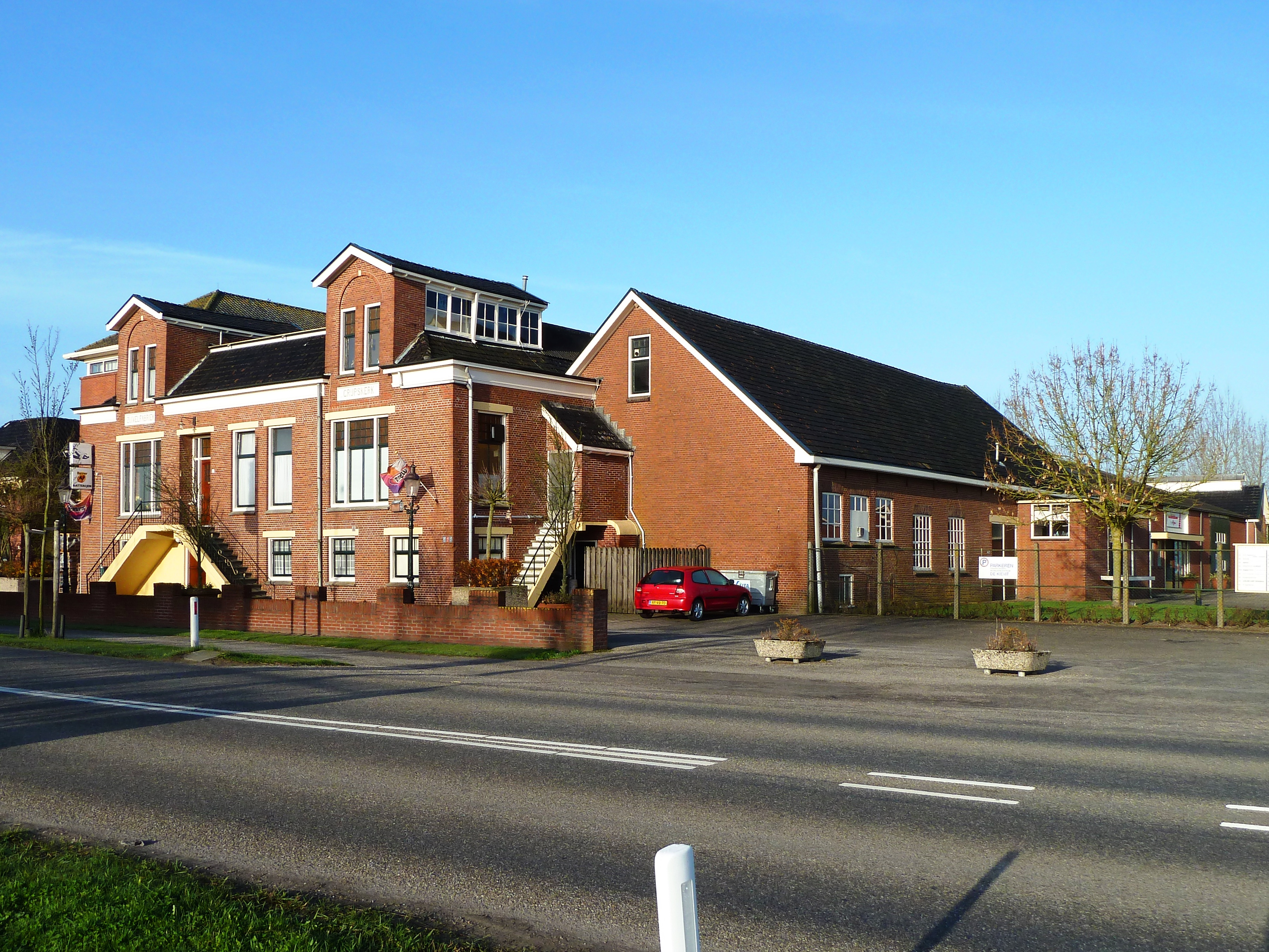
- Dairy factory in 2011
- Nickname: Smallruggen
- Location within Groningen (province) Location within Netherlands
- Coordinates: 53°15′51″N 6°18′22″E
- Country: Netherlands
- Province: Groningen
- Municipality: Westerkwartier

Area
  - Total: 1.37 km^{2} (0.53 sq mi)

Population (2021)
  - Total: 2,455
  - Density: 1,790/km^{2} (4,640/sq mi)
- Time zone: UTC+1 (CET)
  - Summer (DST): UTC+2 (CEST)

Grijpskerk (Dutch: [ɣrɛipsˈkɛr(ə)k]; Gronings: Gruupskerk [χɾypsˈkɛːk] or Griepskerk [χɾips-]; West Frisian: Gryptsjerk [ɡripˈtsjɛrk]) is a village in the Dutch province of Groningen. It is located in the municipality of Westerkwartier, about 18 km west of the city of Groningen.

Grijpskerk was a separate municipality until 1990, when it was merged with Zuidhorn.

== History ==
The village was first mentioned in 1500 as "Ruygwerdt alias Grijpskerke", and probably means church founded by Claus Grijp, the priest of Der Aa-kerk in Groningen. The griffin on the weather vane of the church is probably also related to the Grijp family. Grijpskerk is a dike village which developed after the Ruigewaard was poldered in 1425. The dike later became the main the road from Groningen to Friesland.

The church from around 1500 was destroyed in 1582 by plundering soldiers during the Dutch Revolt. It was rebuilt between 1605 and 1612, and extended in 1856. The Mennonite church originally stood in Pieterzijl and was moved to Grijpskerk in 1892.

Grijpskerk was home to 611 people in 1840. In 1866, a railway station opened on the Leeuwarden to Groningen railway line. The station is still in service, however the building was demolished in 1976.

Grijpswerk used to be an independent municipality until 1990 when it was merged into Zuidhorn. In 2019, it became part of the municipality of Westerkwartier.

== Transportation ==
Railway Station: Grijpskerk

== Notable residents ==
- Hendrik Drogt (1920-1944), resistance hero of Second World War. As member of the Dutch military police, refused assisting the deportation process. Facing deportation himself, he became key in smuggling several people from the Nazi repression, until his capture and martyrdom.
- Roelof Kruisinga (1922-2012), politician (Christian Historical Union and Christian Democratic Appeal)
- Dirk Scheringa (born 1950), founder of DSB Bank, chairman of Dutch Eredivisie club AZ Alkmaar and politician (Christian Democratic Appeal)

== Gallery ==
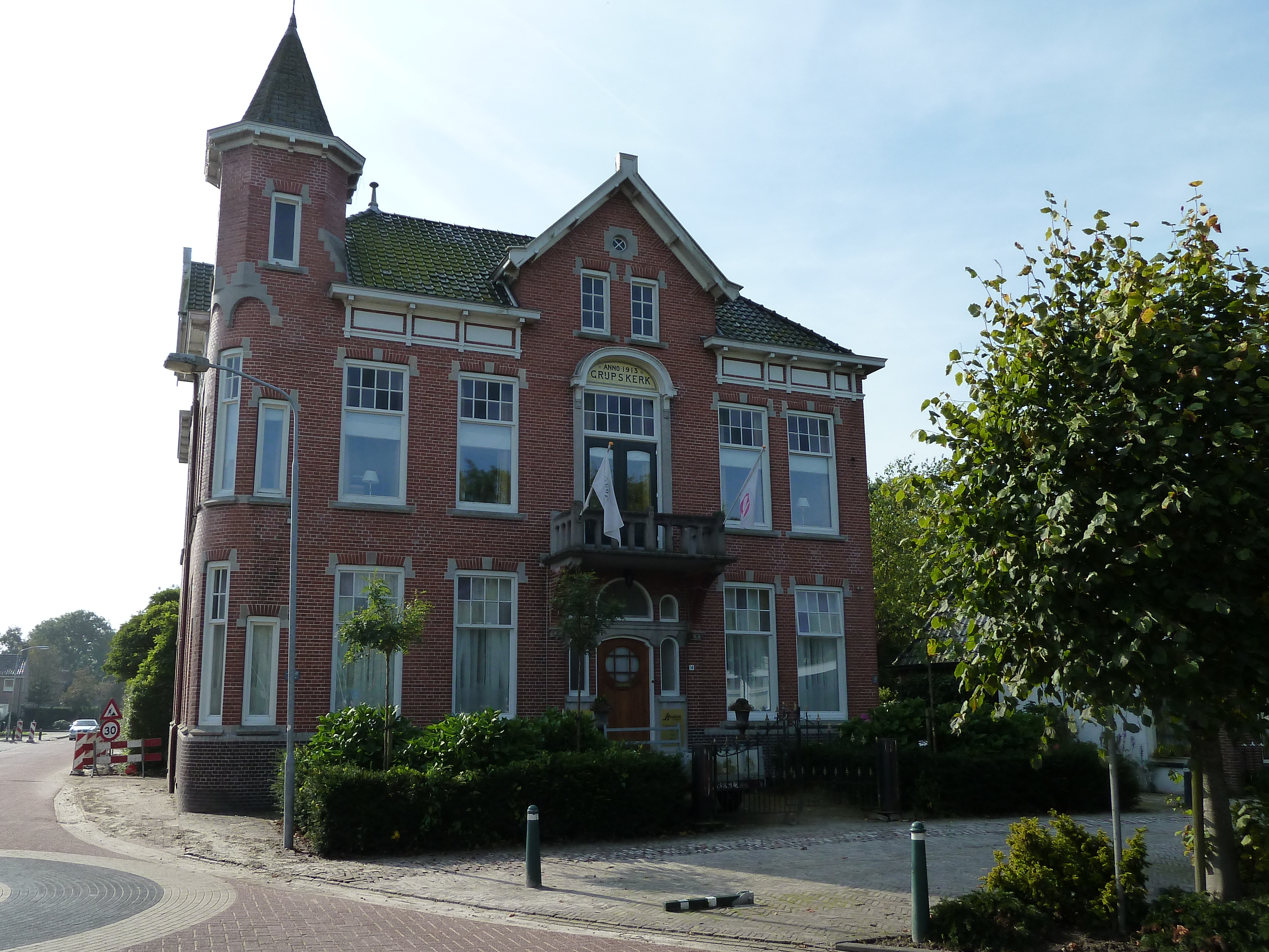
Former town hall

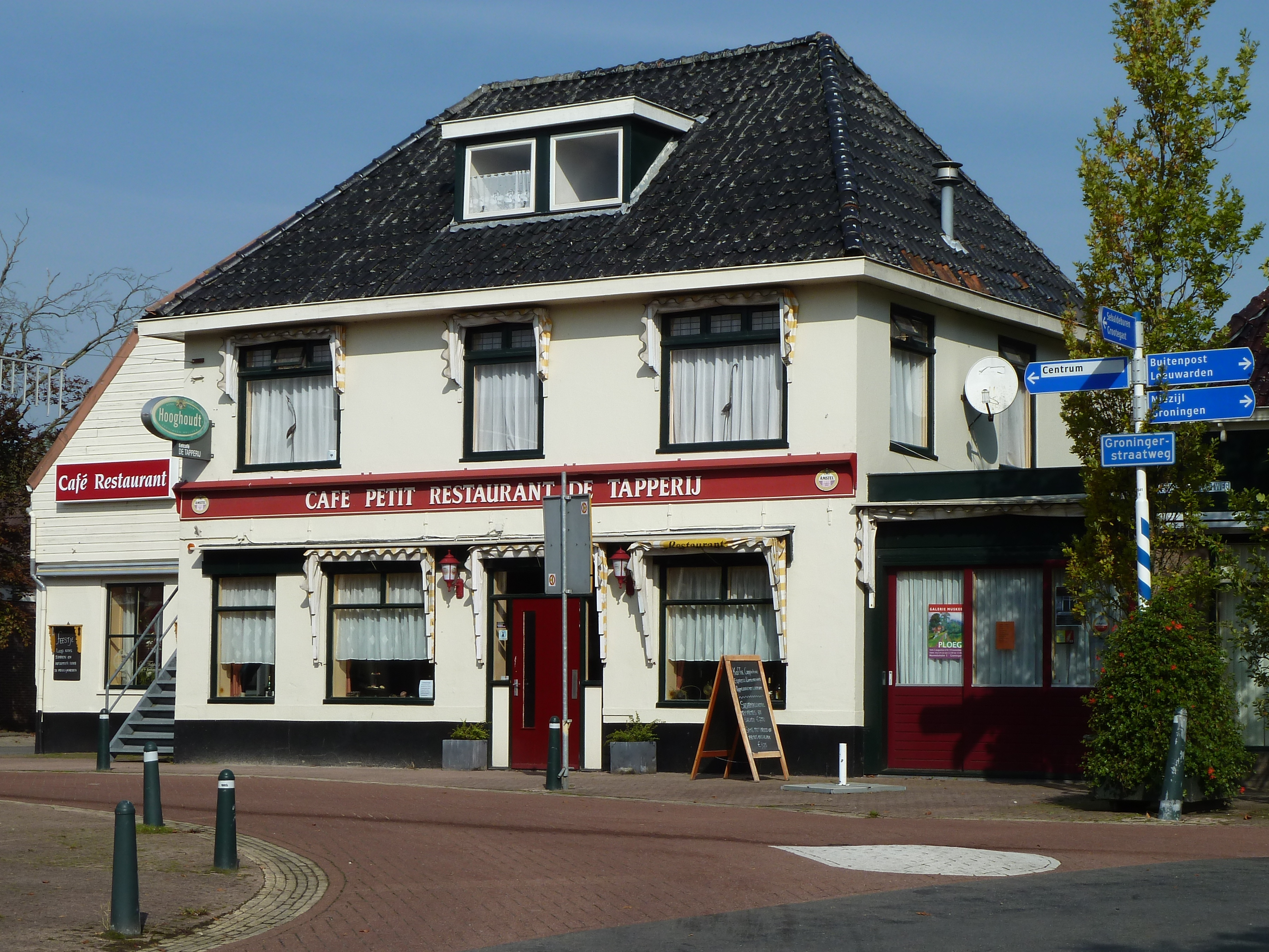
Hotel

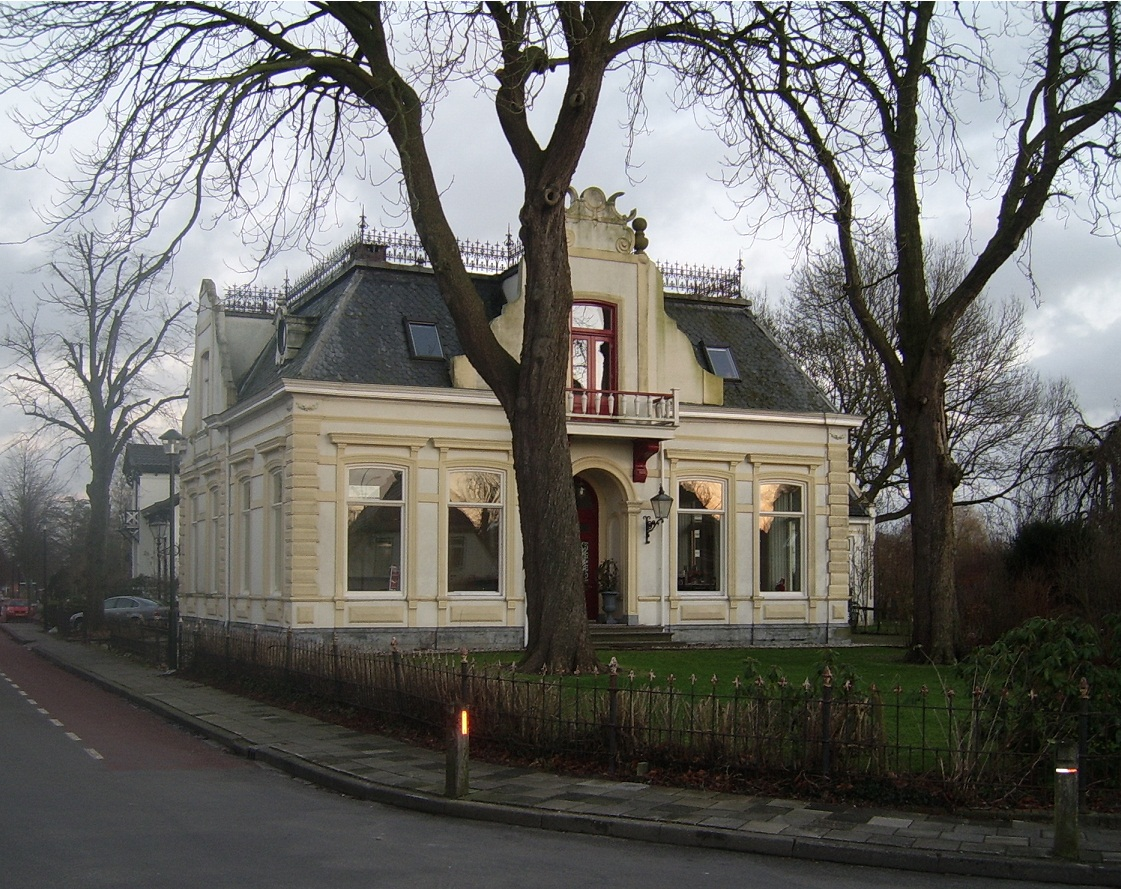
Villa in Grijpskerk

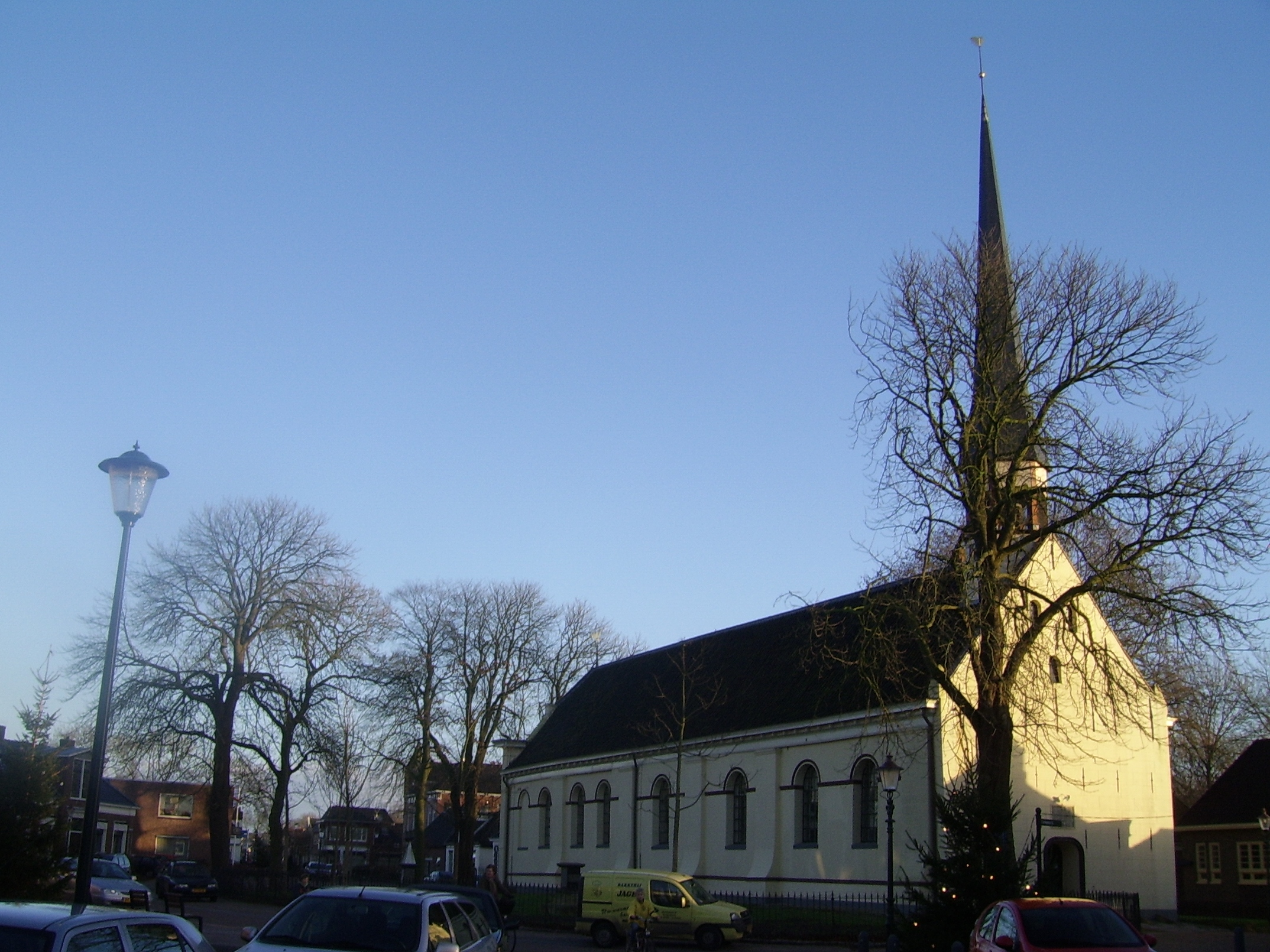
Dutch Reformed church
