= Westerkwartier (municipality) =

- Municipality
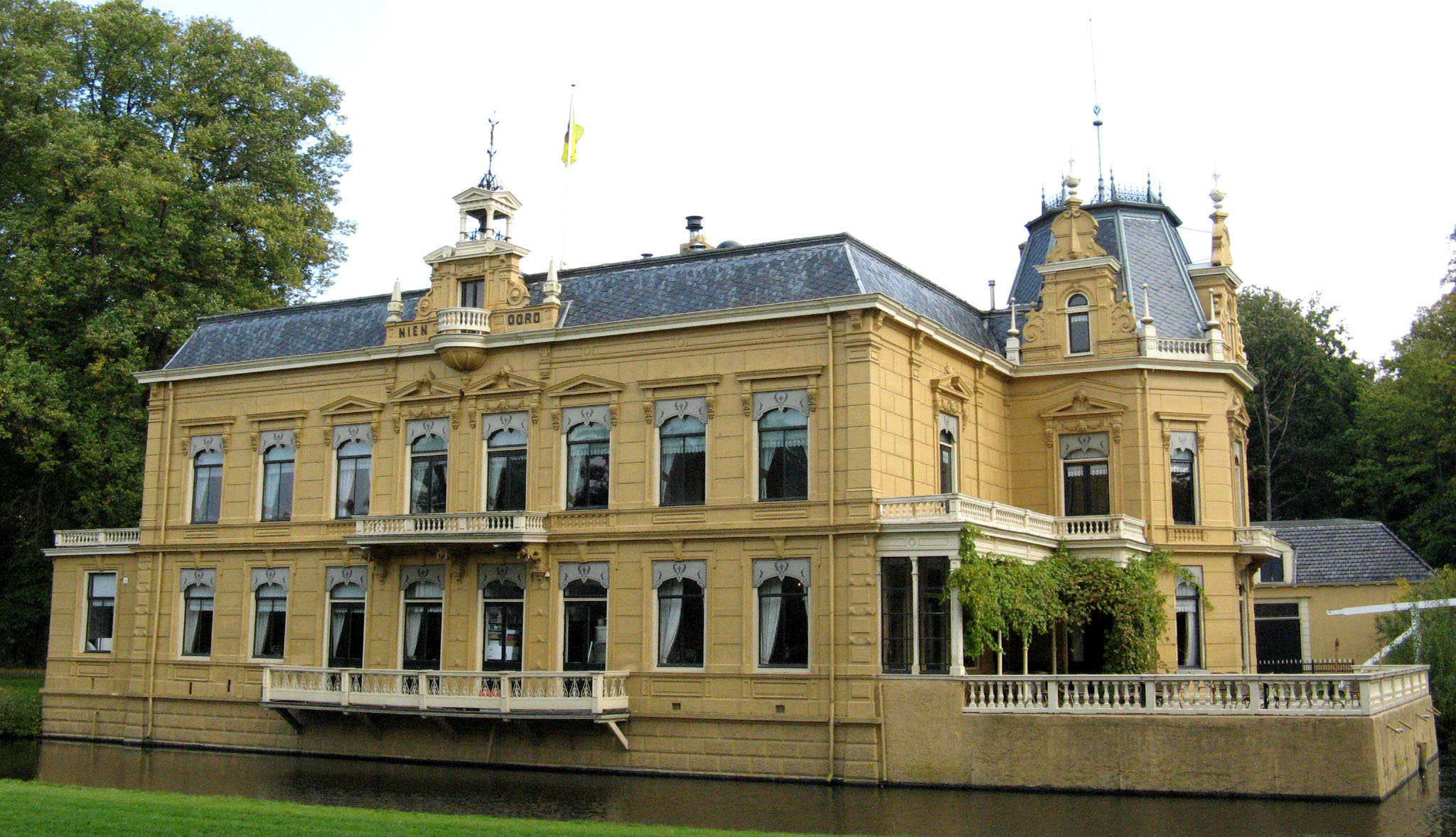
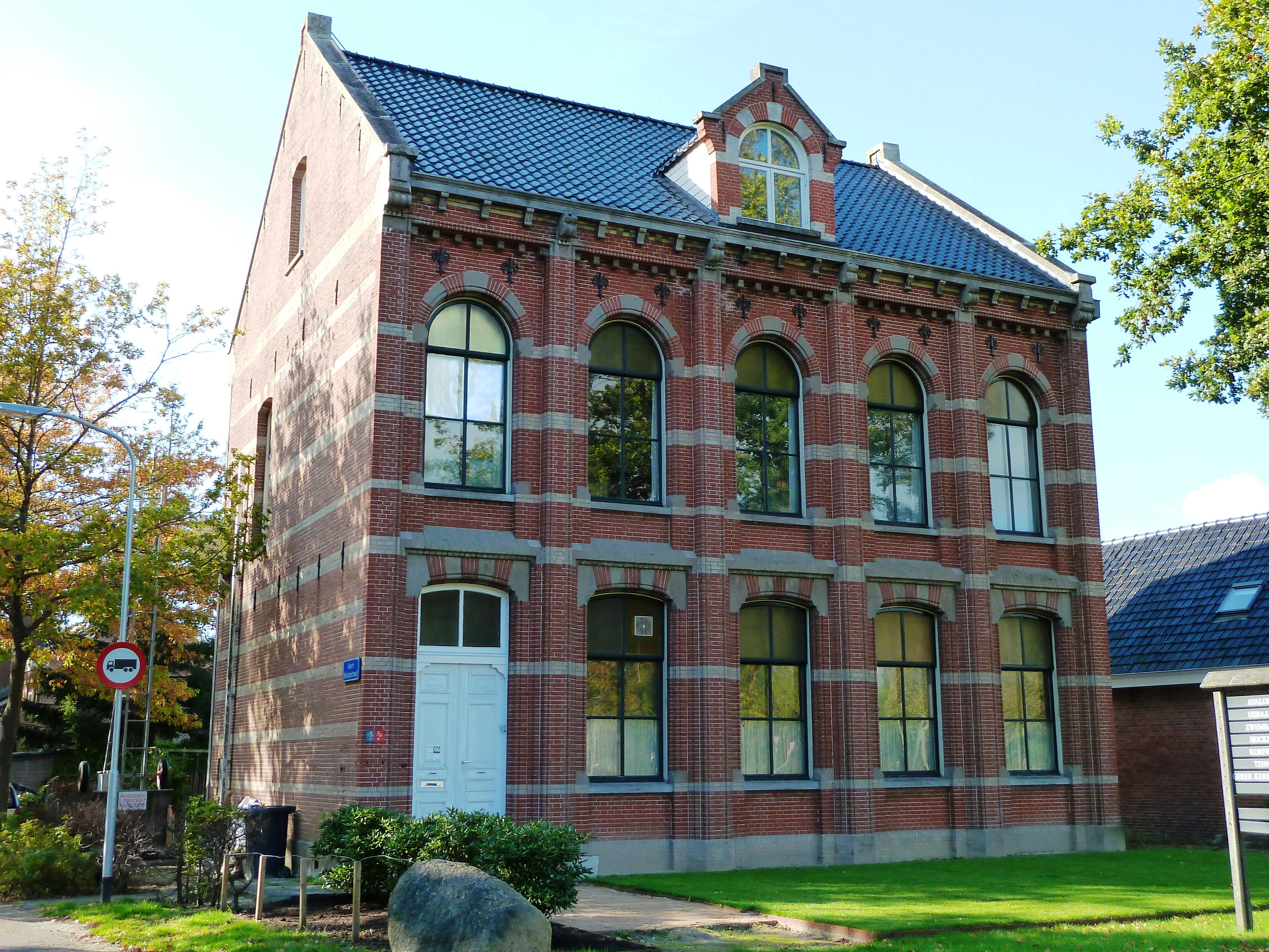
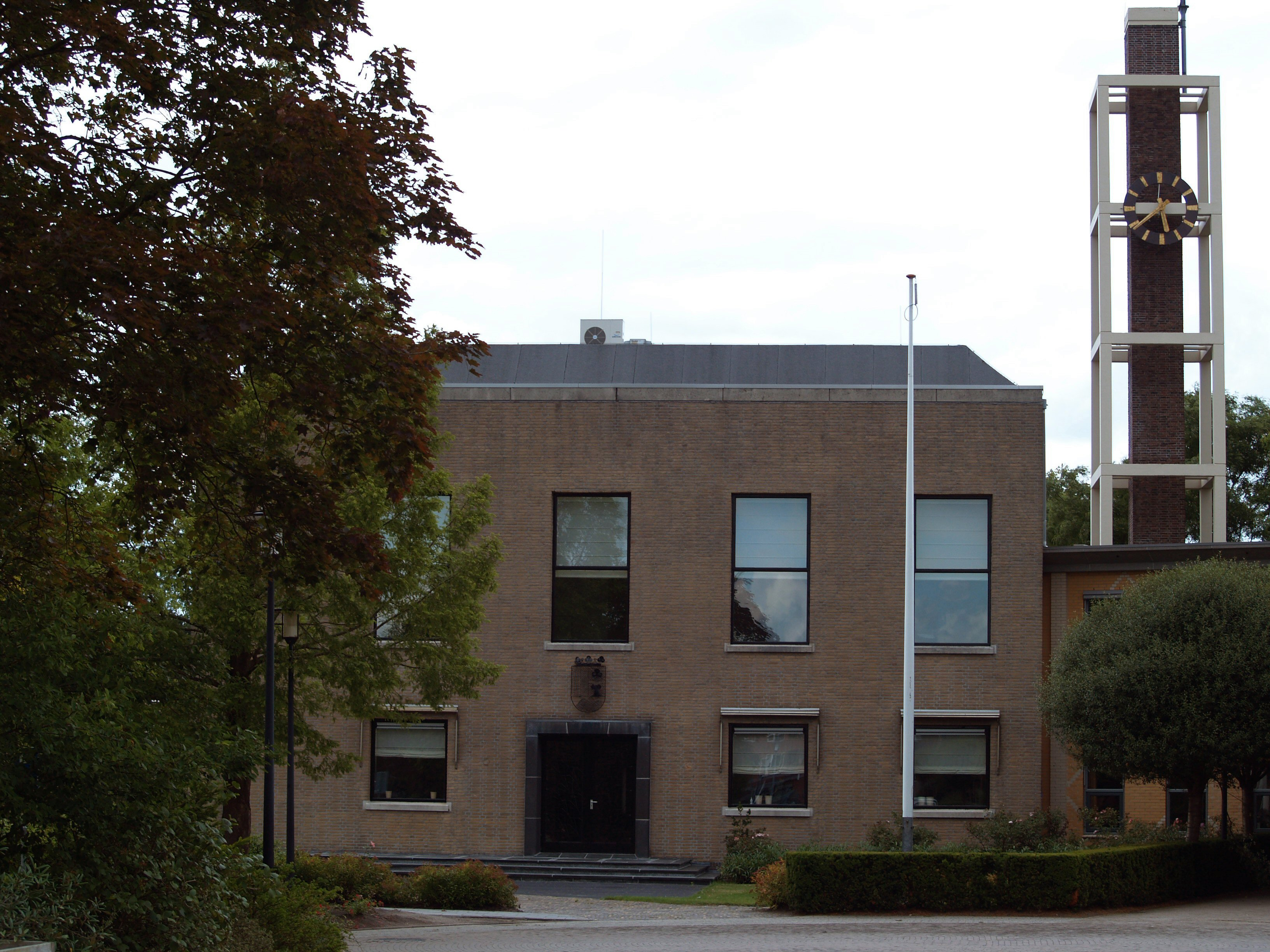
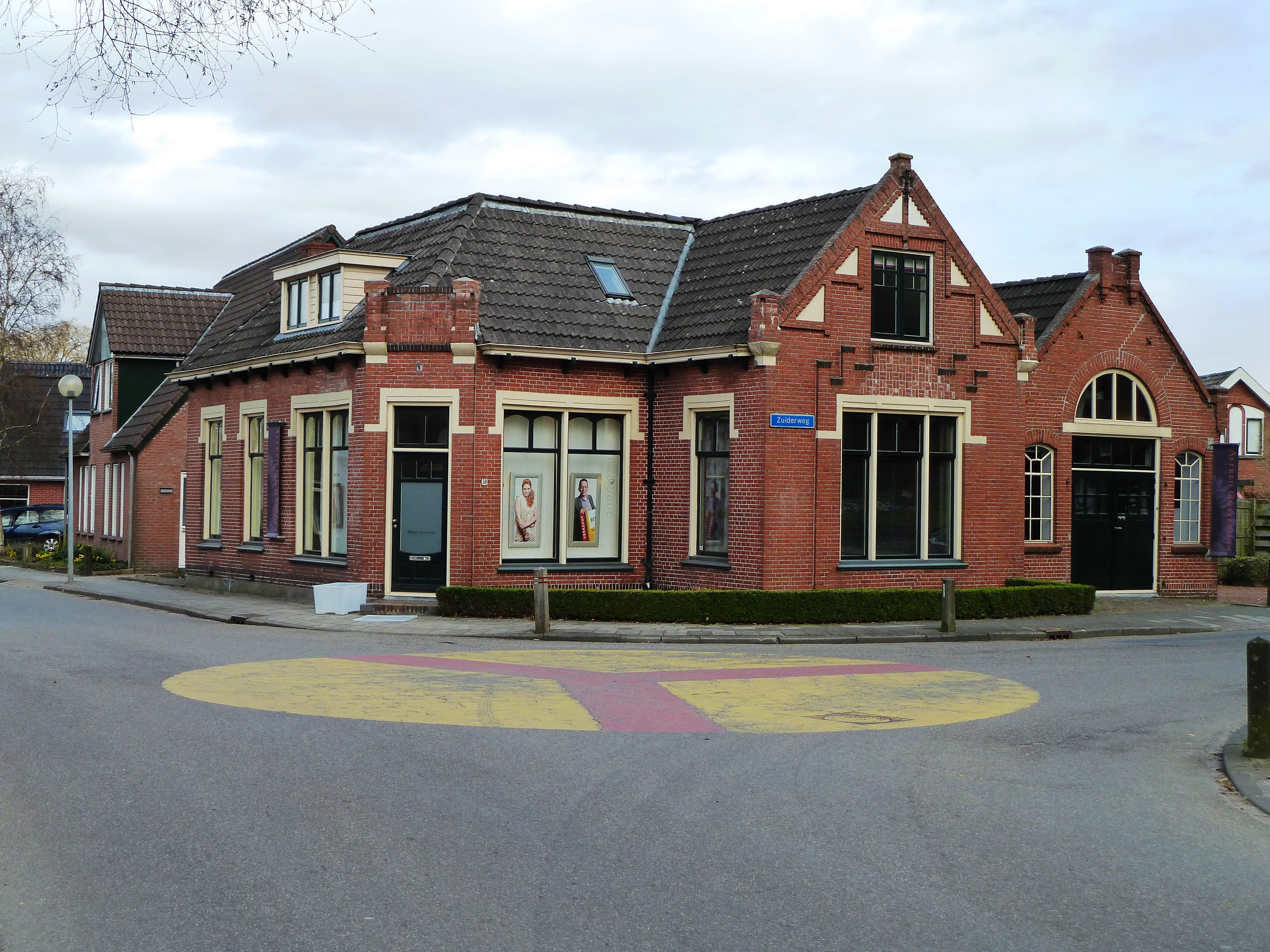
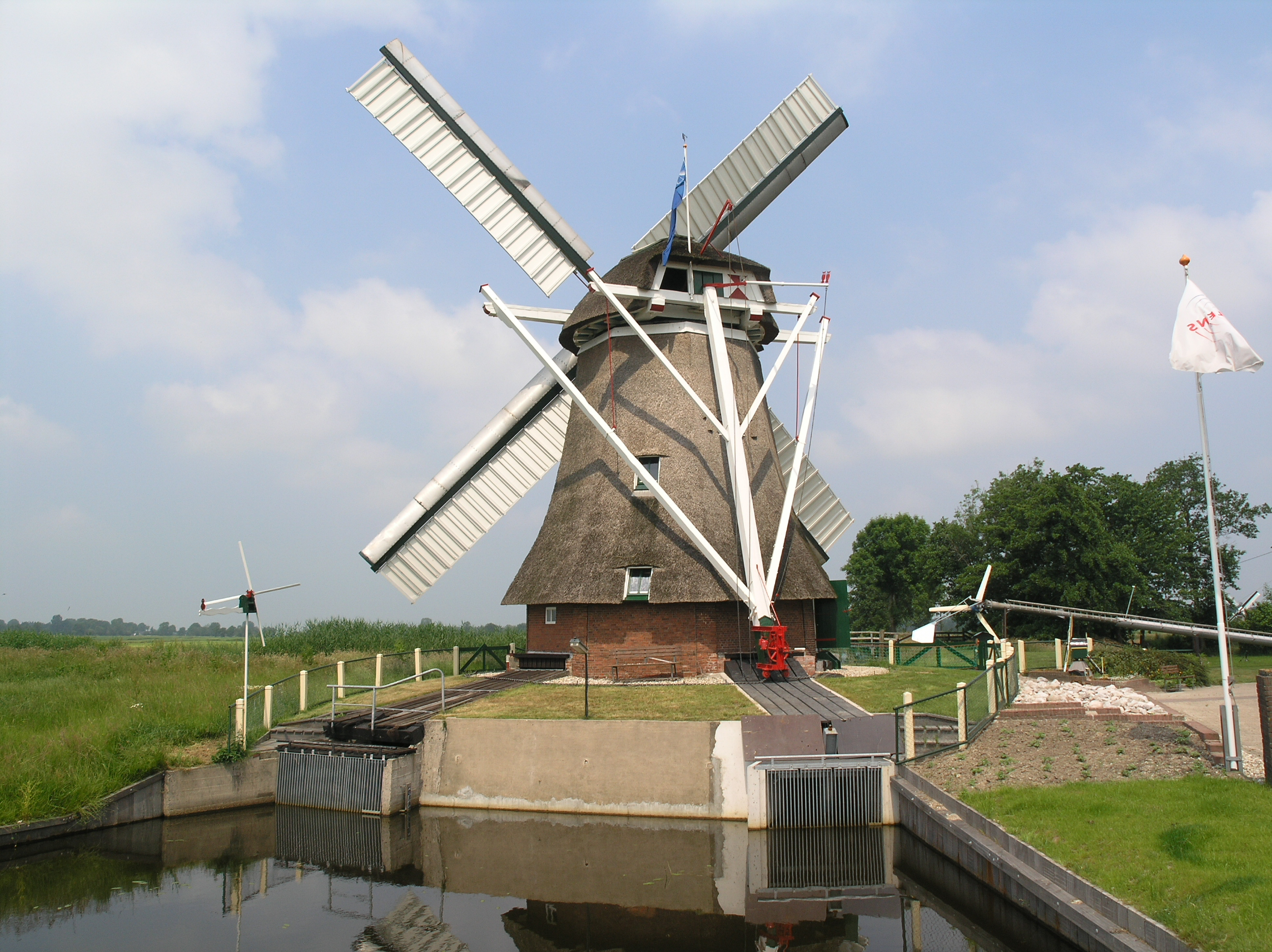
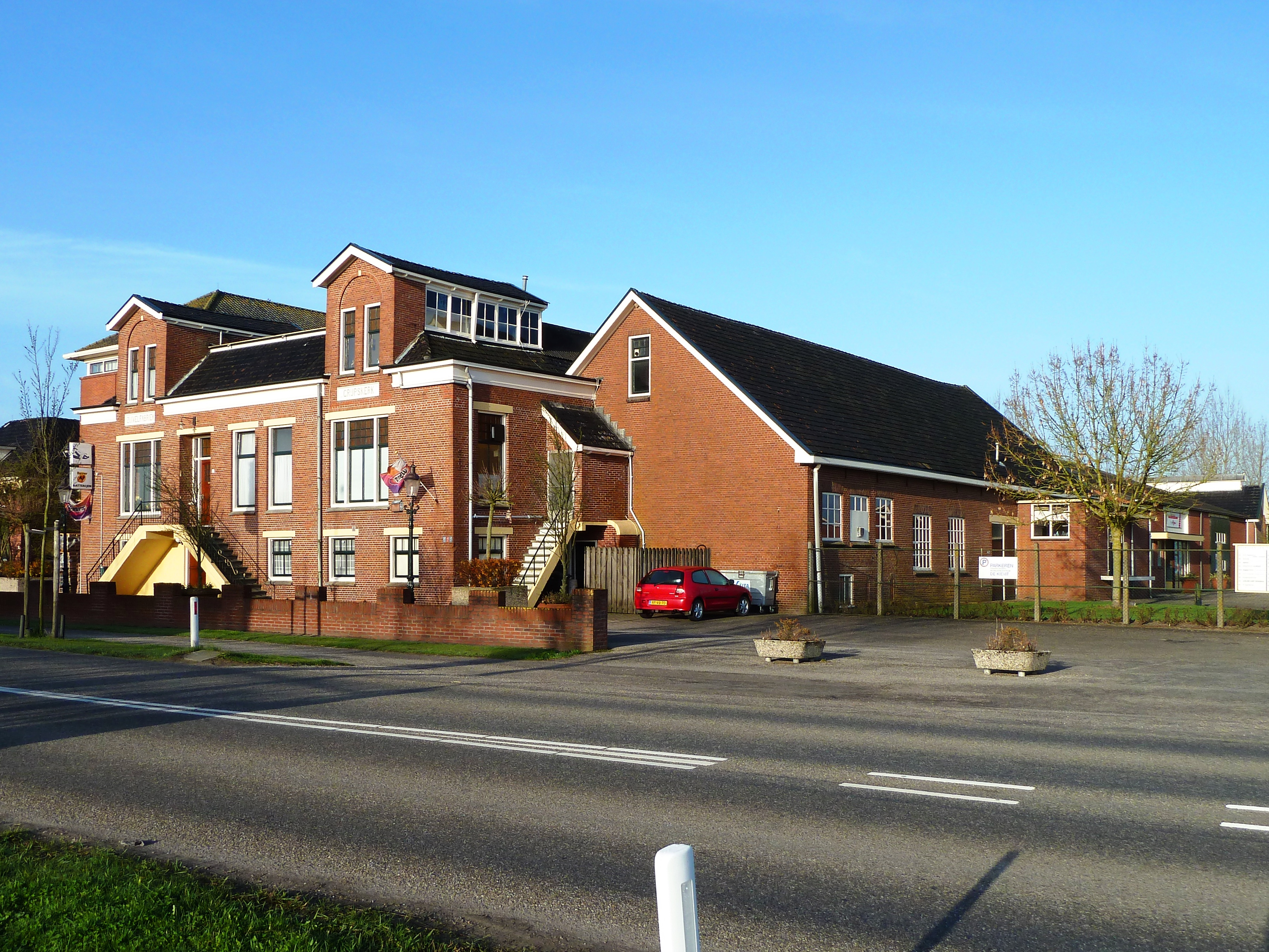
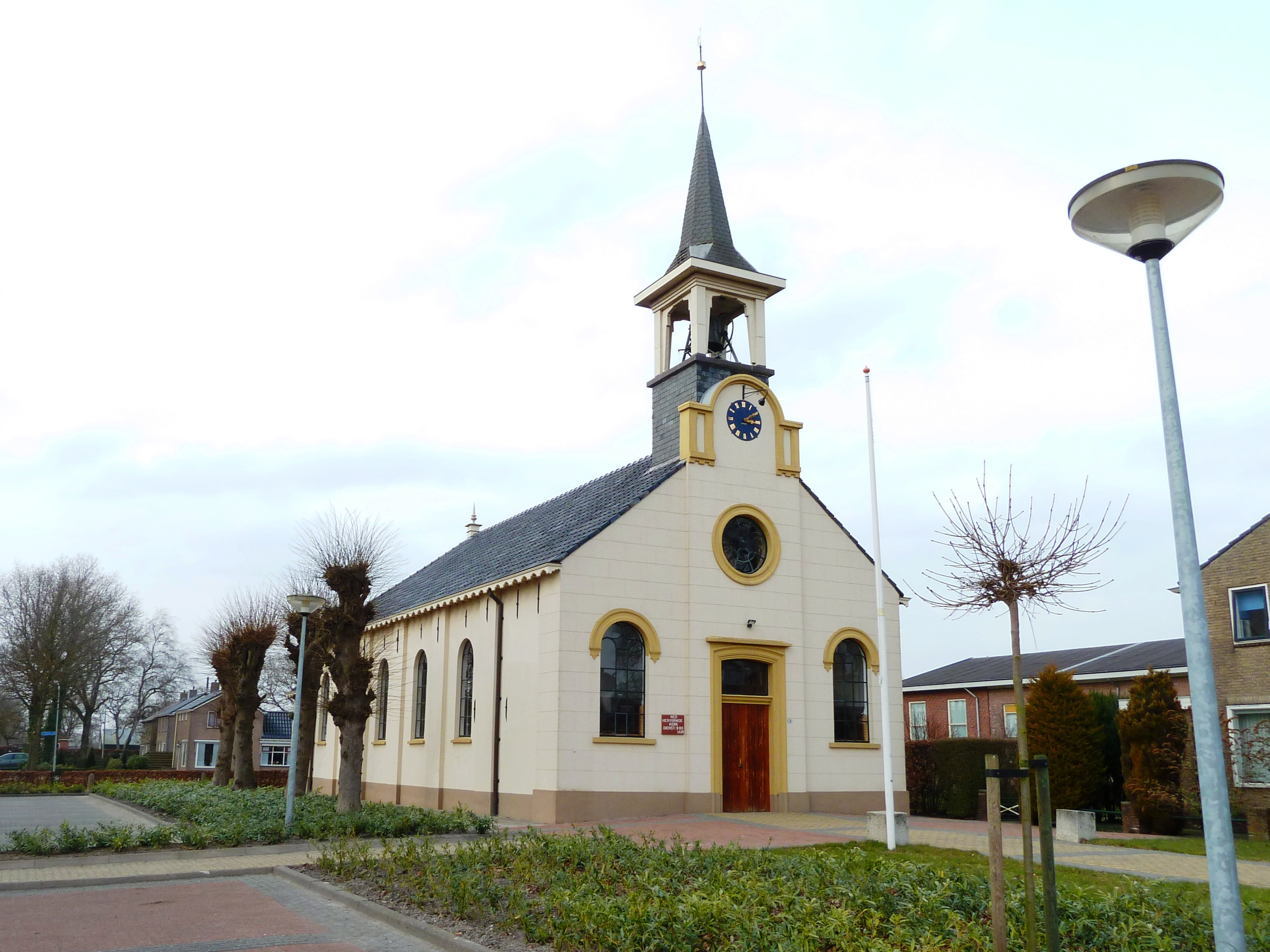
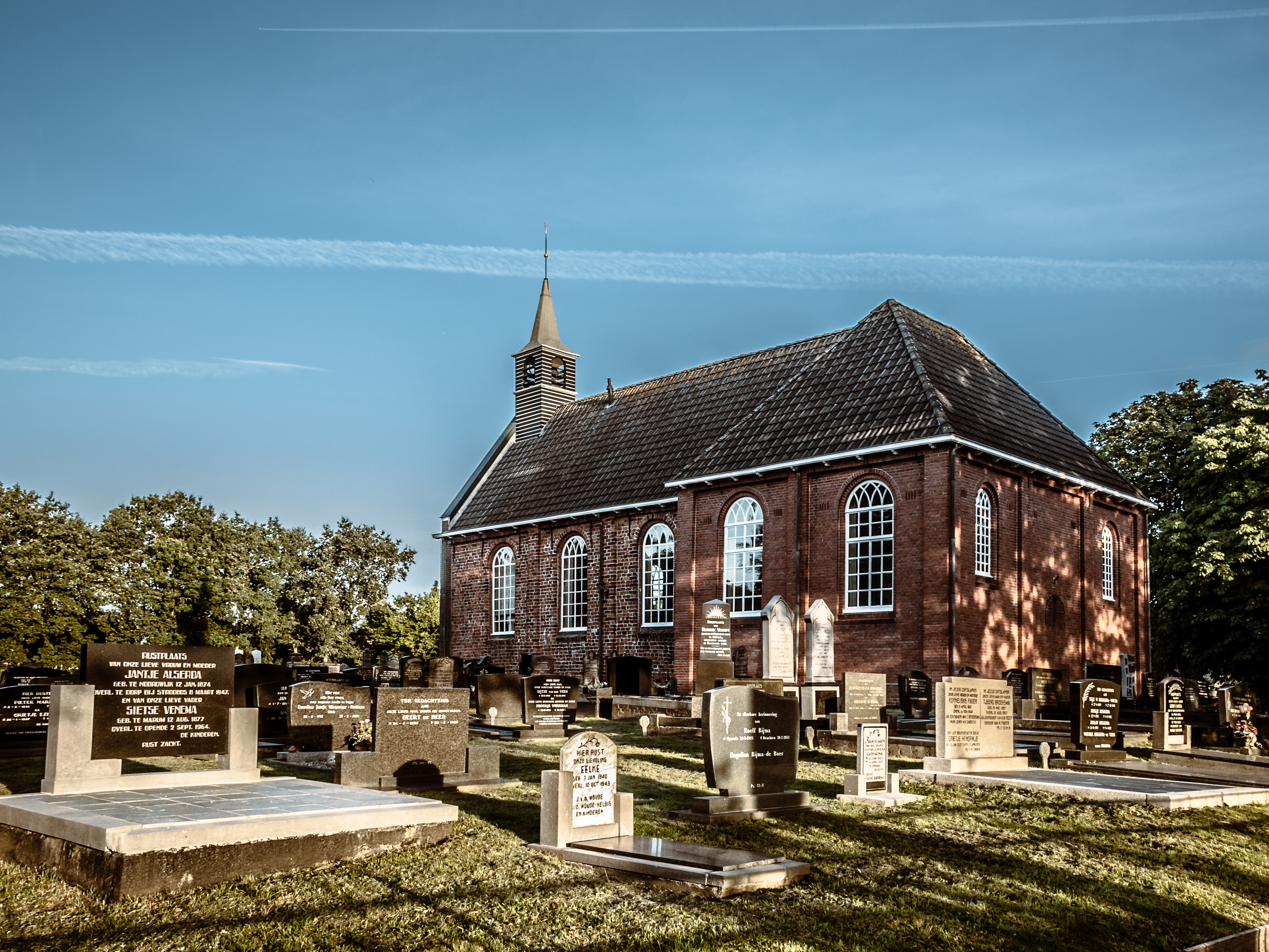
- Leek Zuidhorn Marum Tolbert Grootegast Grijpskerk Zevenhuizen Opende

- Flag Coat of arms

- Location in Groningen
- Coordinates: 53°13′30″N 6°21′10″E
- Country: Netherlands
- Province: Groningen

Government
  - Body: Municipal council
  - Mayor: Ard van der Tuuk (PvdA)

Area
  - Total: 368.87 km^{2} (142.42 sq mi)

Population (January 2019)
  - Total: 63,031
  - Density: 170.88/km^{2} (442.57/sq mi)
- Time zone: UTC+1 (CET)
  - Summer (DST): UTC+2 (CEST)
- Website: www.westerkwartier.nl

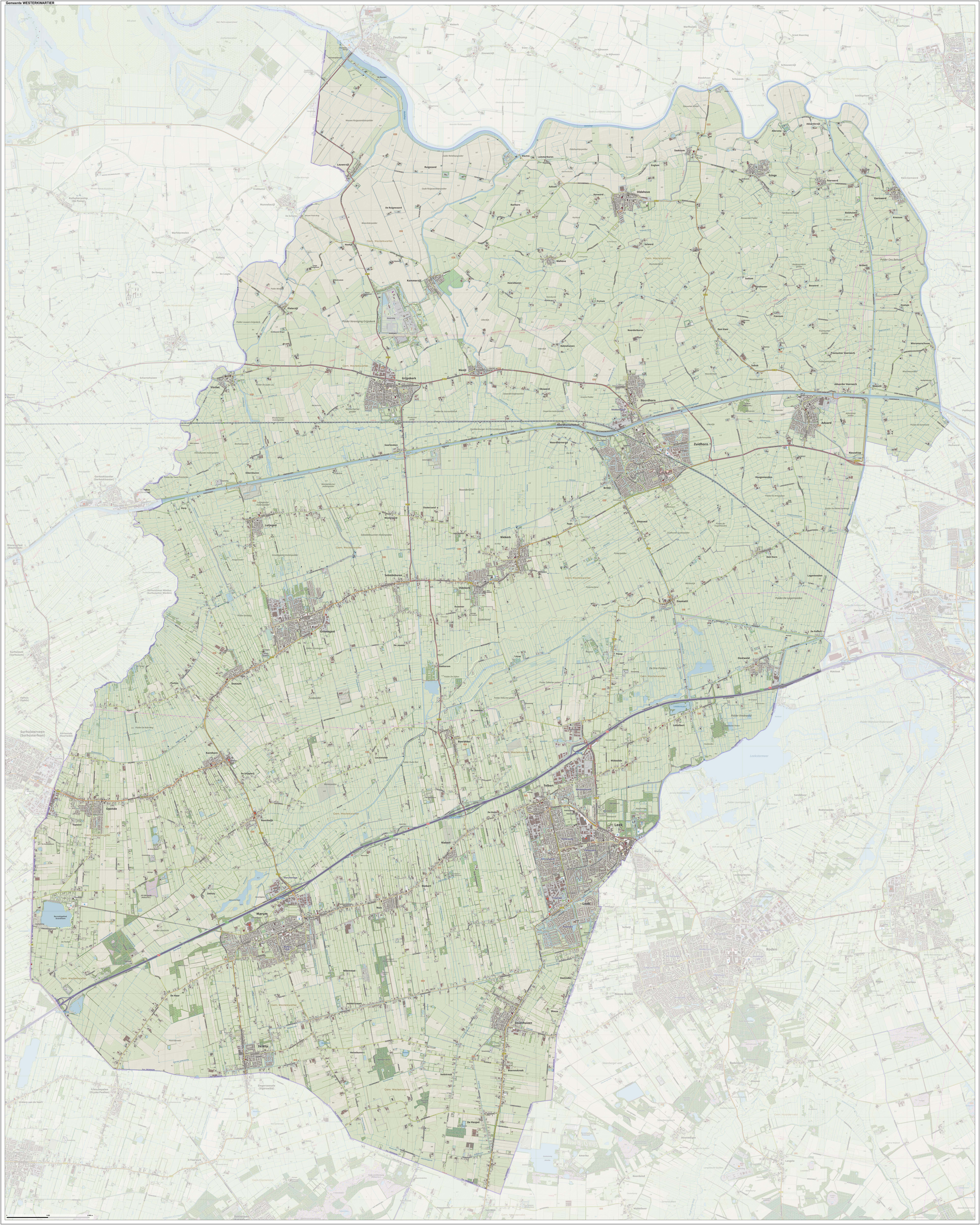
Topographic map of Westerkwartier

Westerkwartier (West Frisian: Westerkertier) is a municipality in the Netherlands, in the province of Groningen.

The municipality was formed on 1 January 2019, by the merger of the municipalities of Grootegast, Leek, Marum, Zuidhorn, and part of Winsum.
