= Anna van Ewsum =

Dutch noblewoman

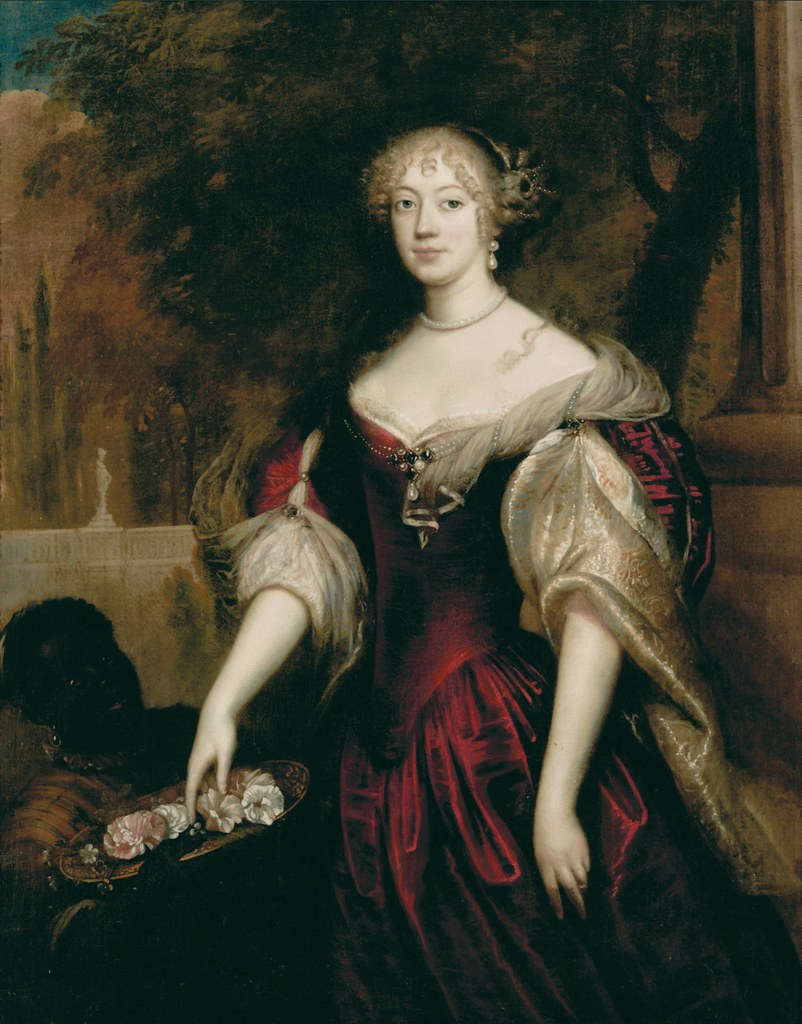
Anna van Ewsum door Jan de Baen, c. 1665

Anna van Ewsum (1640 - 6 November 1714) was a rich Dutch noblewoman.

== Biography ==
Anna van Ewsum was born in 1640 as the only child of Willem van Ewsum (1601 or 1608–1643) and Margaretha Beata von Freitag zu Gödens. Her mother was a descendant of a wealthy German family from the County of East Frisia. Her father was Lord of Nienoord, Vredewold and Noordwijk: upon his death in 1643, Anna van Ewsum became the Lady of the same.

In 1645, her mother remarried to Rudolf Wilhelm zu Innhausen und Knyphausen (1620-1666), a diplomat of the States General of the Netherlands with whom she had two children: Haro Caspar and Maria Elisabeth.

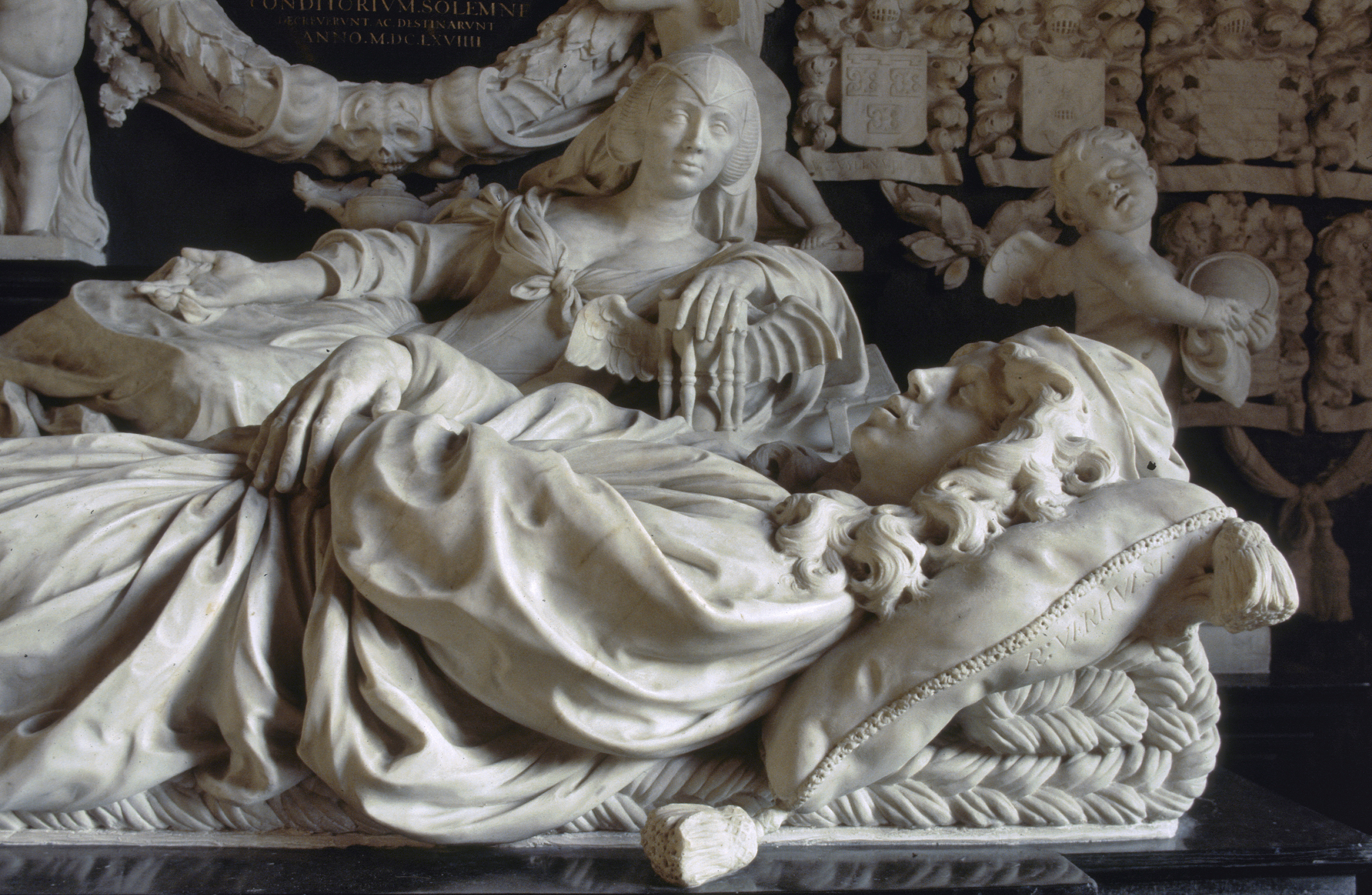
Detail of the tomb of Anna van Ewsum and her husbands, showing Anna sitting

In 1657, Anna van Ewsum married Carl Hieronymus von Inn- und Knyphausen (1632-1664), the brother of her stepfather. He changed his name to the Dutch equivalent of his German name, Carel Hieronymus van Inn- en Kniphuisen. When he died, Anna ordered a sepulchral monument for her husband and herself from the sculptor Rombout Verhulst, to be placed in the local church of Midwolde.

In 1665 Anna remarried to Georg Wilhelm van Inn- en Kniphuisen (1635-1709), a nephew of her stepfather and her late husband. They had one son, Carel Ferdinand van Inn- en Kniphuisen (1669-1717), who after her death becomes Lord of Nienoord etc. In 1694 Freiherr Georg Wilhelm was made Count by the Holy Roman Emperor. When he died in 1709, Anna ordered a sculpture by Bartholomeus Eggers to be added to the monument. In 1714, Anna van Ewsum died in 1714 and is buried in the church together with her husbands.

== Patroness of the arts ==
Anna van Ewsum is remembered as a patroness of the arts, who employed some of the best Dutch artists of the period. Jan de Baen painted portraits of her and her second husband, while Herman Collenius was hired in 1679 to make 3 large panel paintings for the walls of the dance hall. The garden of the castle was enhanced with a sculpted gate and around 1700 with a monumental shell cave, the Shell Grotto.

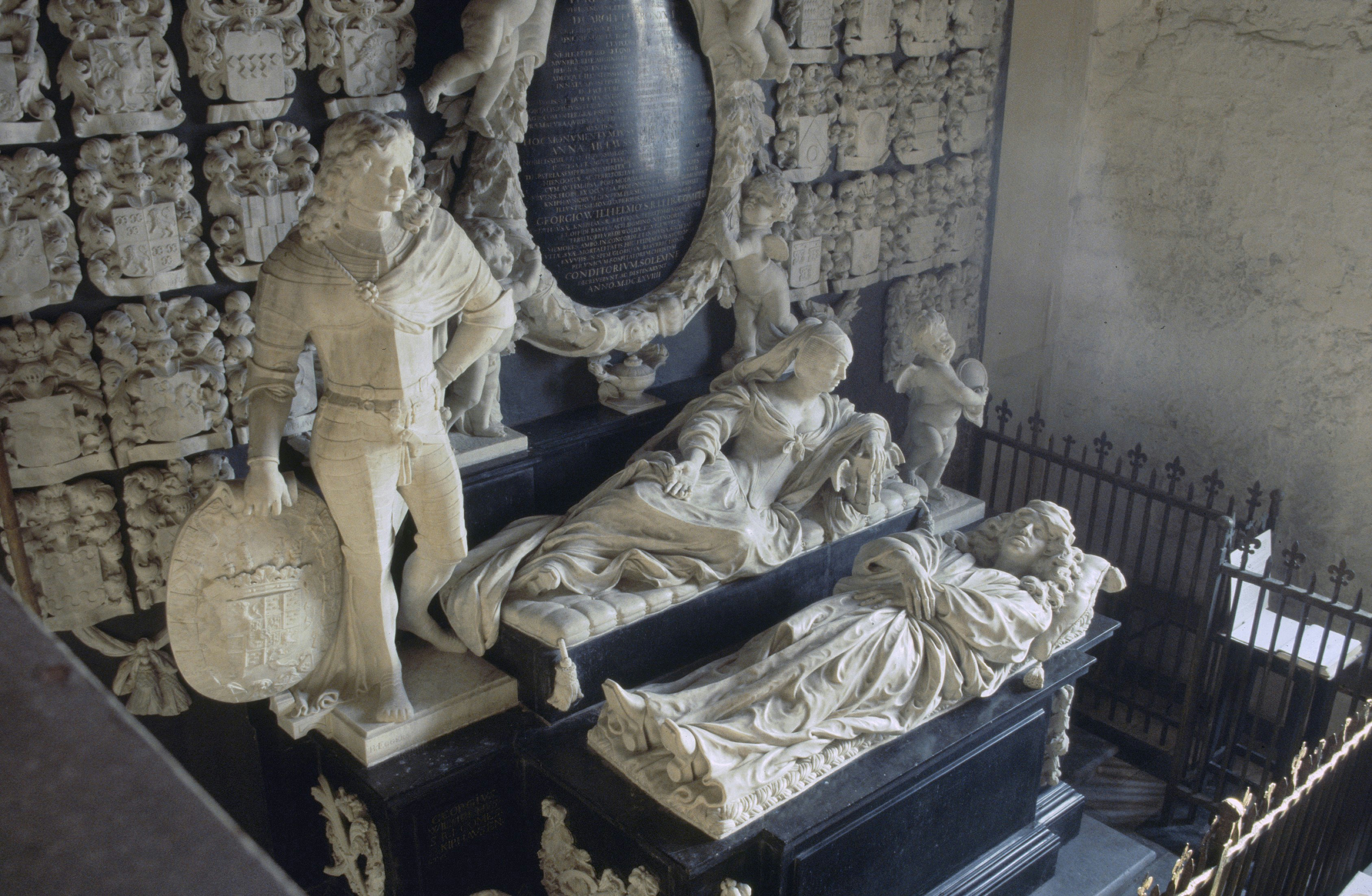
Overview of the sepulchral monument of Anna van Ewsum, with her first husband lying down and her second husband standing to the left of her

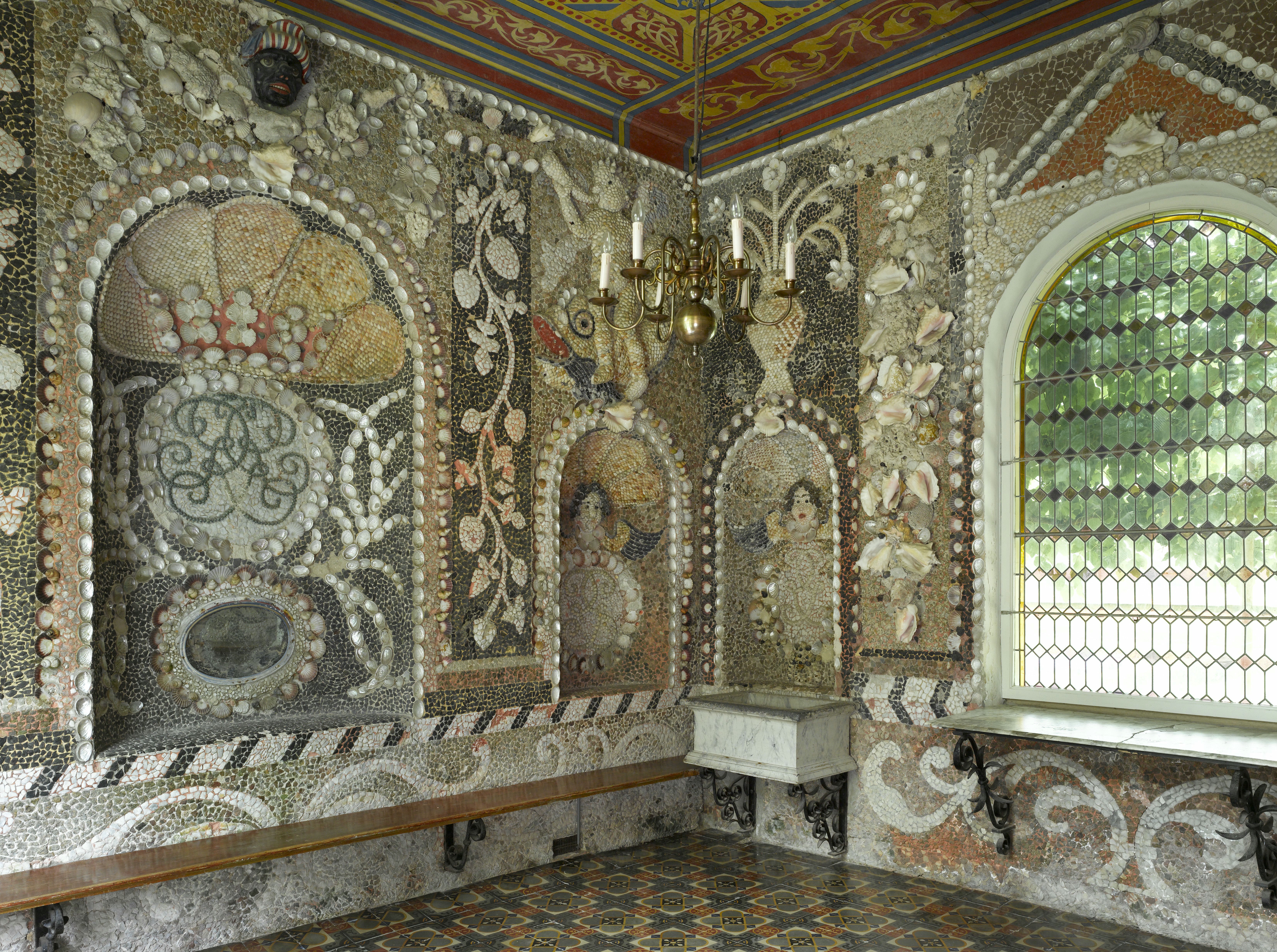
Detail of the Shell Grotto

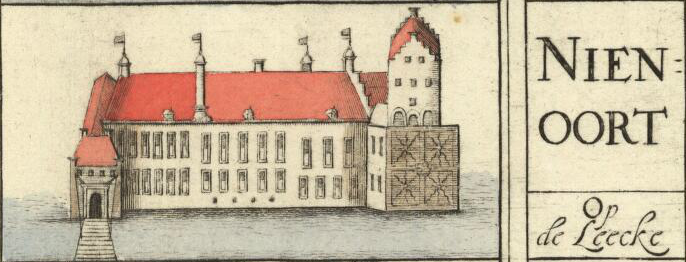
Nienoord castle in 1678
