= Rombout Verhulst =

Flemish sculptor and draughtsman

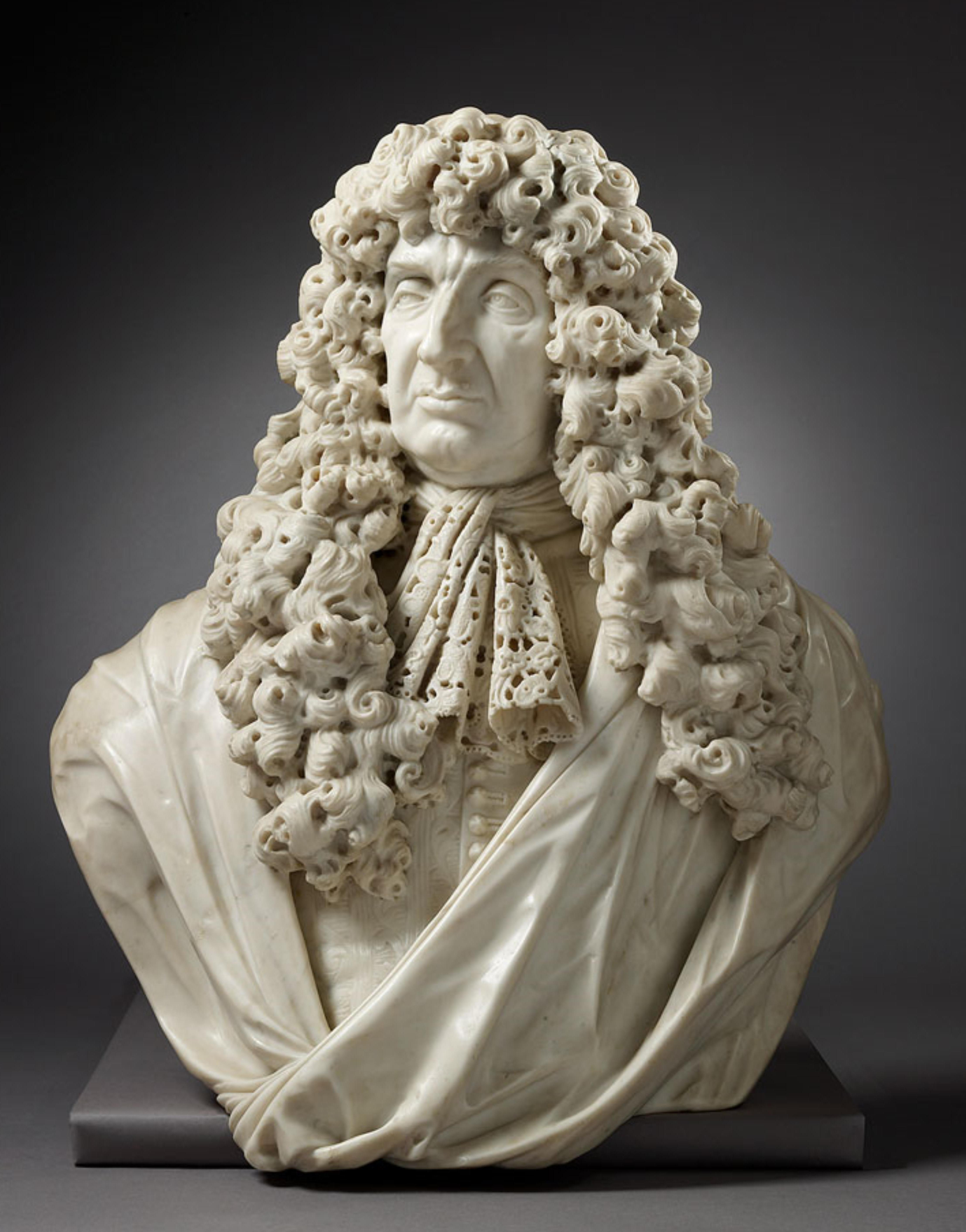
Bust of Antonio Lopes Suasso

Rombout Verhulst (15 January 1624 – buried 27 November 1698) was a Flemish sculptor and draughtsman who spent most of his career in the Dutch Republic. An independent assistant of the Flemish sculptor Artus Quellinus the Elder in the sculptural decoration project for the new town hall in Amsterdam, he contributed to the spread of the Baroque style in Dutch sculpture. He became the leading sculptor of marble monuments, including funerary monuments, garden figures and portraits, in the Dutch Republic.

== Life ==
Rombout Verhulst was born in Mechelen, where he studied with the sculptors Rombout Verstappen en Frans van Loo and possibly also Lucas Faydherbe, a prominent sculptor and architect from Mechelen. It is assumed that between 1646 and 1654 he made a trip to Italy.

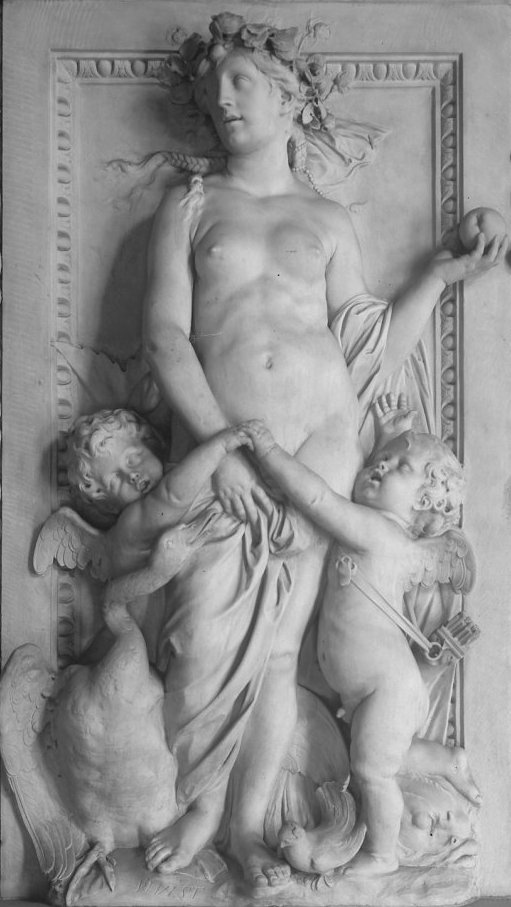
Venus, Amsterdam Town Hall

In 1646 he moved to Amsterdam, where he worked on the decoration of the new town hall as a member of the workshop n Amsterdam of the Flemish sculptor Artus Quellinus the Elder, the leading Flemish Baroque sculptor of his time. From 1650 onwards, Quellinus worked for fifteen years on the new city hall in Amsterdam together with the lead architect Jacob van Campen. Now called the Royal Palace on the Dam, this construction project, and in particular the marble decorations that Quellinus and his workshop produced, became an example for other buildings in Amsterdam. Quellinus invited many Flemish sculptors to assist him in the realisation of this project. Many of these collaborators such as his cousin Artus Quellinus II, Bartholomeus Eggers and Gabriël Grupello would become leading sculptors in their own right. The sculptural decorations in the Amsterdam city hall established the international reputation of Quellinus and his workshop and would lead to many more foreign commissions for the Quellinus workshop including in Germany, Denmark and England. This helped further spread the Flemish Baroque idiom in Europe. Verhulst held an independent position among Quellinus' co-workers as is apparent from the fact that he was the only one to individually sign works in this project. He also employed his own assistants such as the Flemish sculptor Nicolaes Millich. At the Amsterdam town hall, he is known to have executed the reliefs of Venus, Fidelity and Silence for the galleries and terracotta studies for the bronze doors of the Vierschaar.

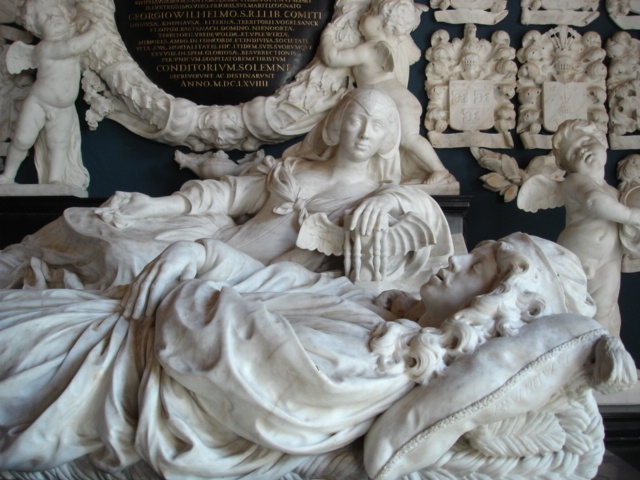
Tomb monument of Carel Hieronymus van In- en Kniphuizen

In 1663, Verhulst worked in Leiden as an independent master and completed works on municipal buildings and his first funeral monuments. He then moved to The Hague around 1664 and built a network of private patrons in which the van Reygersbergh family played a pivotal role. In 1663 Verhulst completed a funeral monument for Maria van Reygersbergh in the church of Katwijk-Binnen. This was the first private commission for this type of work in the second half of the 17th century. His patronage shifted gradually from Amsterdam to The Hague.

He died, aged 74, in The Hague.

He was the teacher of Jan Blommendael and Jan Ebbelaer.

== Work ==
Rombout Verhulst is best known for his many tomb monuments, but he made also portrait busts, garden sculptures and small-scale works in ivory.

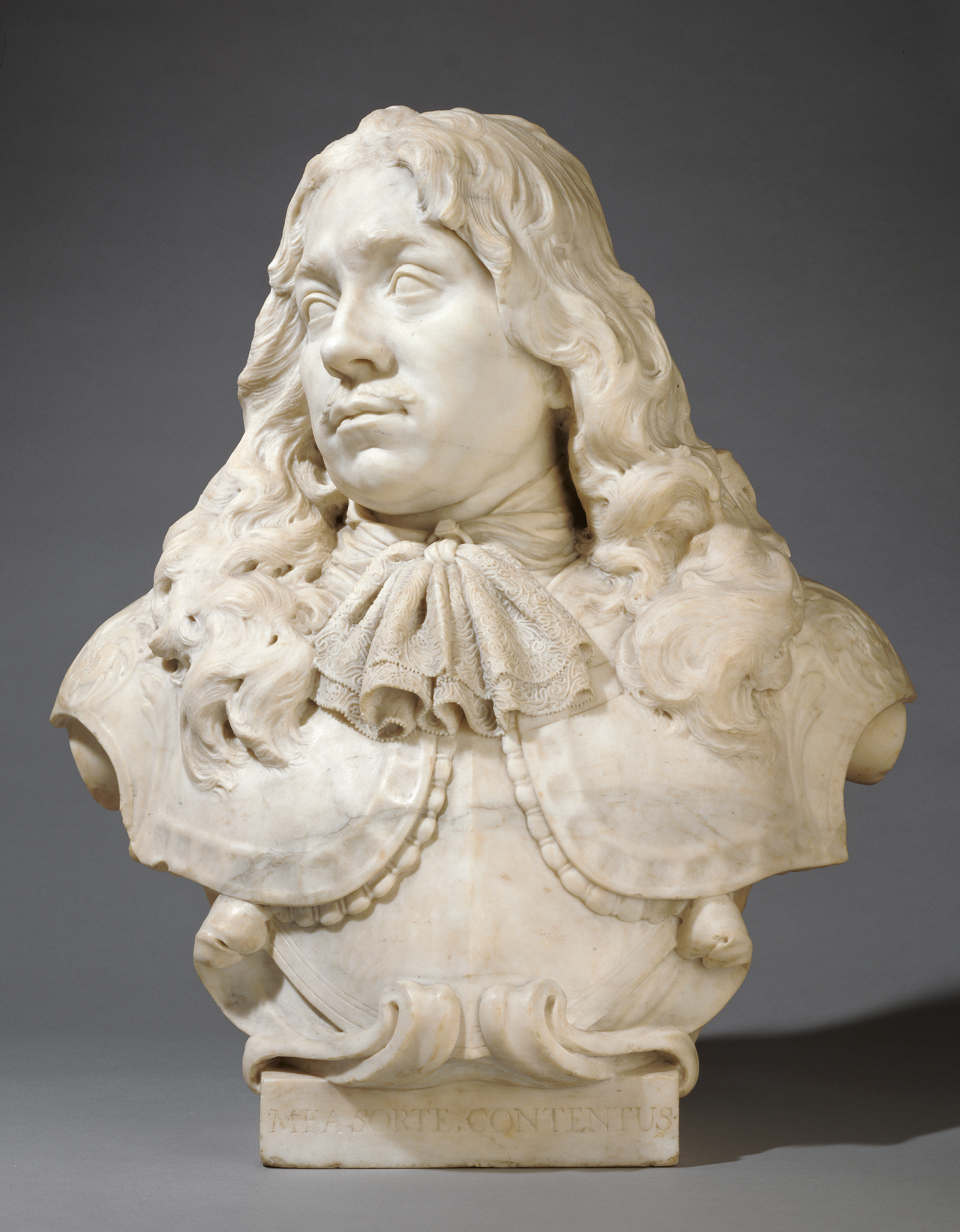
Bust of Jacob van Reygersbergh

His portrait oeuvre is rather small, which demonstrates that there was only a limited market for portrait sculptures in the Dutch Republic. One of his best-known portraits is the marble bust of Jacob van Reygersbergh dated 1671, now in the Getty Museum in Los Angeles. A terracotta study for this work is in the Rijksmuseum and it differs from the marble version only in details. This portrait bust shows Verhulst's virtuosity and the naturalism of his style. He removed any tendency to idealize the sitter in this work. An important portrait bust attributed to Verhulst is that of Antonio Lopes Suasso, a leading Jewish merchant and banker in Amsterdam. This works was earlier attributed to Quellinus but is now given to Verhulst on stylistic grounds. In his terracotta portraits he was able to create a living presence through his sensitive handling of the physiognomy and a correct evocation of the sitter's personality.

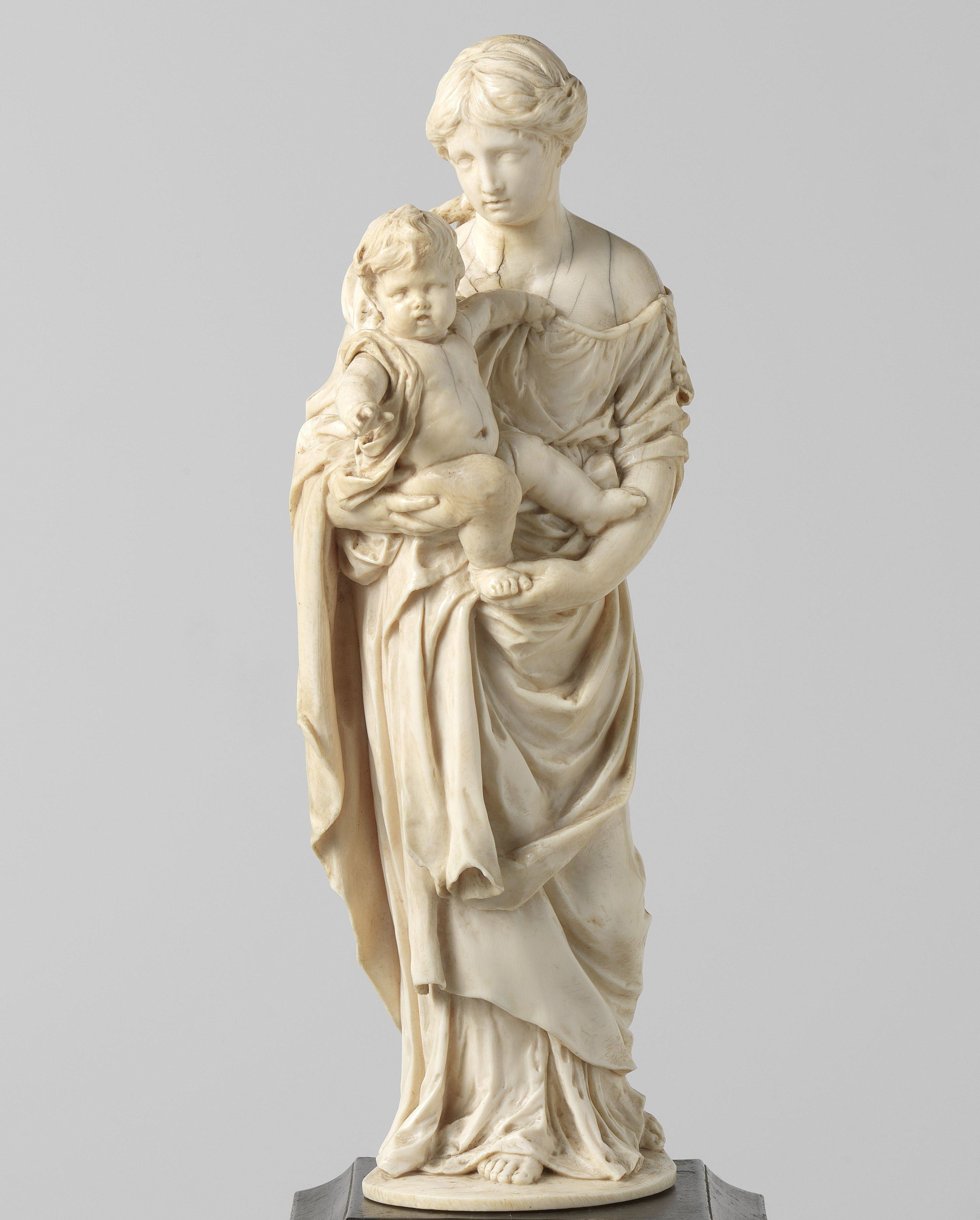
Virgin and Child

Verhulst is mainly remembered for this many tomb monuments for private and public patrons. His funeral monument for Maria van Reygersbergh of 1663 established his reputation in this area with its new and imposing style. He made many church monuments erected to commemorate Dutch naval heroes. His chief work in this area (though possibly not his most successful creation) is the decorated tomb of the Dutch naval hero Michiel de Ruyter in the Nieuwe Kerk in Amsterdam. Another important tomb monument was that of Carl Hieronymus Baron van In- en Kniphuizen and Anna van Ewsum made for the Dutch Reformed church in Midwolde. It was made at the request of the widow of the Baron and was one of the few private commissions for tomb monuments in the Dutch Republic. It is a variation on the traditional double tomb, which combines two figures, the recumbent dead person, and the other living one raised on an elbow. The widow Anna van Ewsum takes centre stage by gazing straight at the viewer. A statue of the second husband of the widow made by Bartholomeus Eggers was later added to the tomb replacing two putti holding memento mori symbols.

In addition to the monumental commissions he completed, Verhulst made small-scale ivory carvings, a specialty for which his home town Mechelen was particularly known. A small ivory Virgin and Child held in the Rijksmuseum shows his skill in this regard. He has carved the thick, wavy locks of hair of the chubby Christ Child and the heavy drapery with such realism that they appear almost tangible.

Although his style was indebted to Artus Quellinus, he did not completely adopt Quellinus' classicist tendencies. Verhulst's work is warmer in conception and executed with greater refinement and therein resembles more that of the Antwerp sculptors from the circle of Peter Paul Rubens, including Johannes van Mildert and Lucas Faydherbe. His work was usually more realistic than that of Quellinus and is less dramatic.

== Selected works ==
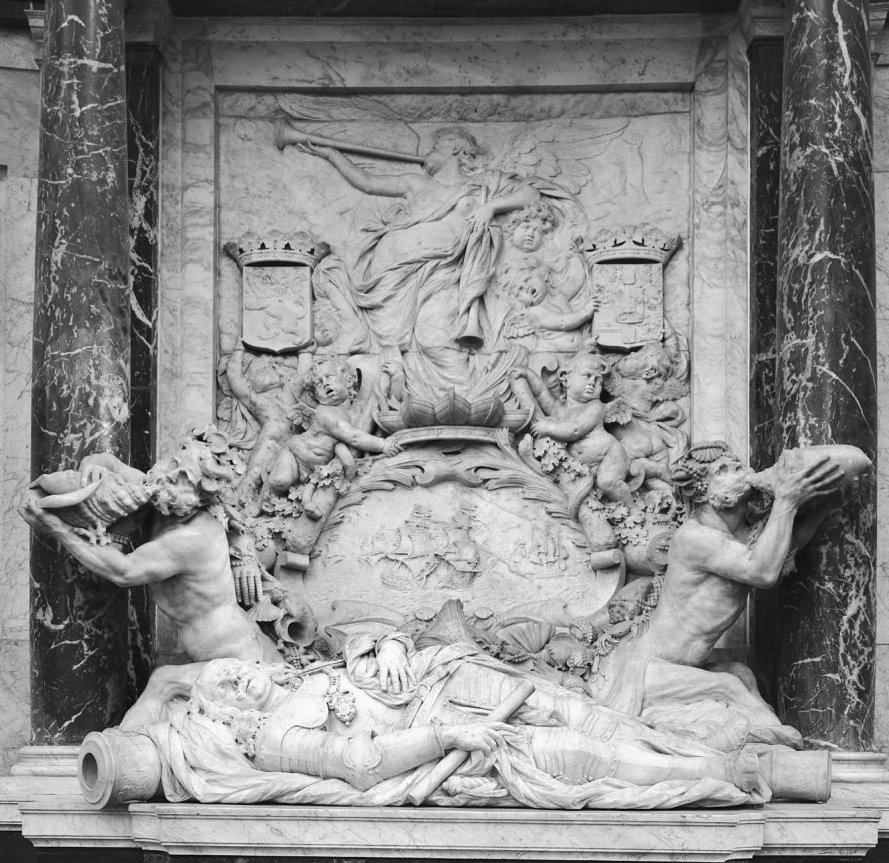
Tomb of Michiel de Ruyter, central part

- "Venus and the swan" and portrayals of Modesty and Fidelity (ca. 1654), galleries of the Amsterdam city hall in Amsterdam
- Decorated tomb of Jan van Galen (About 1655), the New Church in Amsterdam. The design is by Artus Quellinus, the sea-battle scene is by Willem de Keyser.
- The tomb of Maarten Harpertszoon Tromp (Completed 1656), the Oude Kerk in Delft. The design is probably by Jacob van Campen and the sea-battle scene by Willem de Keyser.
- Sculpture on the facade of the Waag (1657), Leiden
- Relief representing the plague in the form of a Fury (1660), above the gate of the plague house in Leiden
- Epitaph for Pieter van der Werff (1661), Hooglandse Church, Leiden
- A lion above the gate at the base of the Burcht at Leiden (1662)
- Tomb of Willem van Lyere and Maria van Reigersberch, Dorpskerk at Katwijk aan den Rijn
- Tomb for Johan Polyander Kerkhoven (1663), Pieterskerk, Leiden
- Tomb of Carel Hieronymus van In- and Kniphuisen (1665–69) in the church at Midwolde
- Epitaph for Hendrick Thibaut and his wife and daughter (1669) in the church of Aagtekerke
- Epitaph for schout-bij-nacht Willem van der Zaen (1670) in Amsterdam
- Epitaph for Theodor Graswinckel (1670), Grote Kerk at the Hague
- Epitaph for Johannes of Gheel (ca. 1670), church at Spanbroek
- Tomb for Adriaan Clant (1672), church at Stedum
- Epitaph for Isaac Sweers (1674), Oude Kerk at Amsterdam
- Tomb monument of Hieronymus Hieronymus van Tuyll van Serooskerken (ca. 1675), church at Stavenisse
- Tomb of lieutenant-admiral Willem Joseph van Ghent (1676), Domkerk in Utrecht.
- Tomb of Michiel de Ruyter (completed 1681), Nieuwe Kerk in Amsterdam
- Tomb monument for Johan and Cornelis Evertsen (1680–82), Wandelkerk in Middelburg
