= Bartholomeus Eggers =

Flemish sculptor

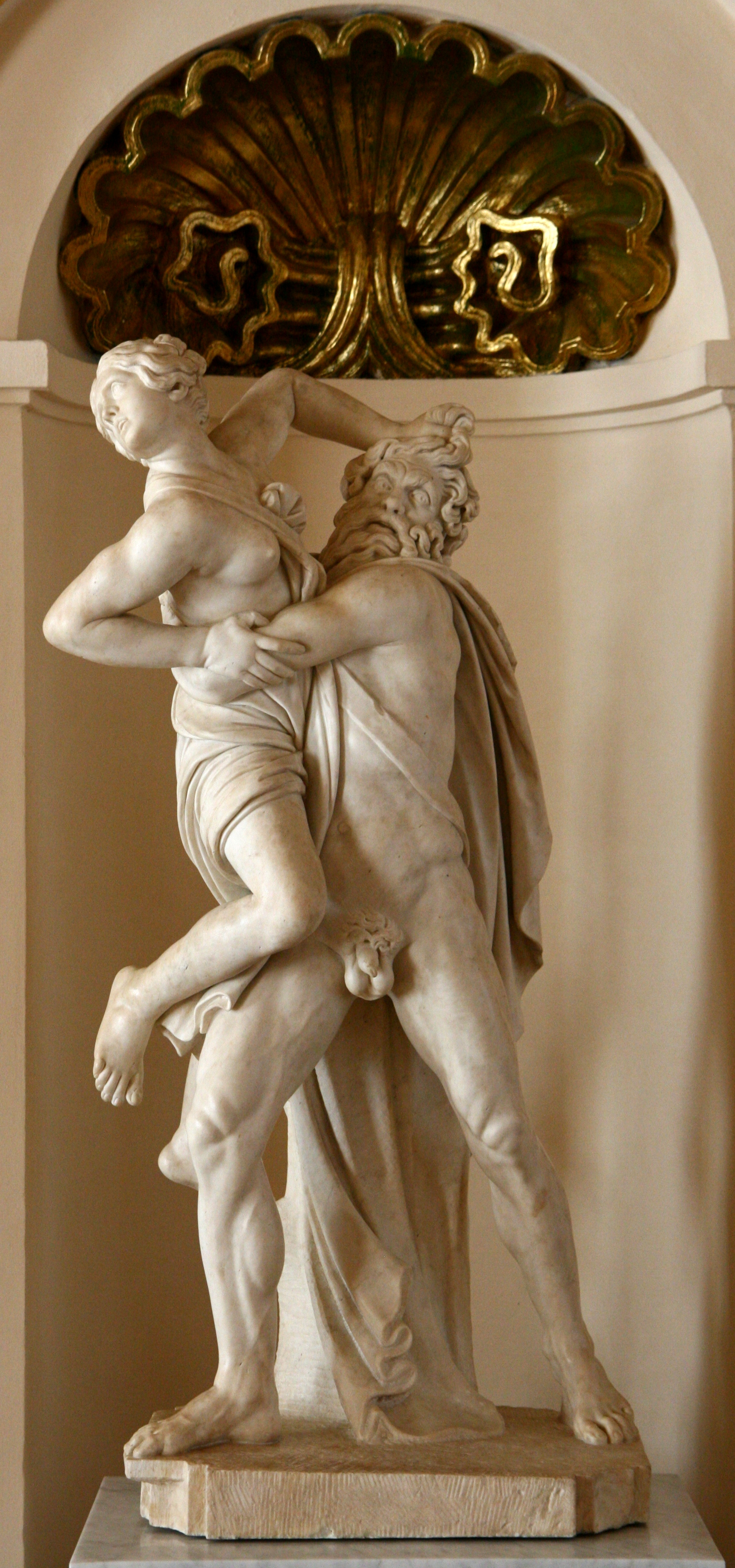
Rape of Proserpina

Bartholomeus Eggers (c. 1637 – before 23 February 1692) was a Flemish sculptor, who after training in his hometown Antwerp spent most of his active career in the Dutch Republic. Here he initially collaborated with other Flemish sculptors on the sculptural decorations for the new city hall in Amsterdam, a project which was under the direction of Artus Quellinus the Elder. He worked on various public projects and on commissions for leading courts in Europe. He is known for his portraits, funerary sculptures, reliefs, statues of children and allegorical, biblical and mythological sculptures. He was, together with Artus Quellinus the Elder and Rombout Verhulst, one of the leading sculptors active in the Dutch Republic in the second half of the 17th century.

== Life ==
Bartholomeus Eggers was born in Antwerp, the son of Bernaert Eggers, a gardener, and Elisabeth van Ouwenhuysen (or Oudenhuysen). He had a brother called Jacob (or Jacobus) who also became a sculptor but died relatively young. In the guild year 1646–1647, he was registered at the Antwerp Guild of Saint Luke studying sculpture as a pupil of Pieter Verbrugghen I. The Guild register notes that he was a poor pupil who did not pay his Guild dues but was registered for the record.

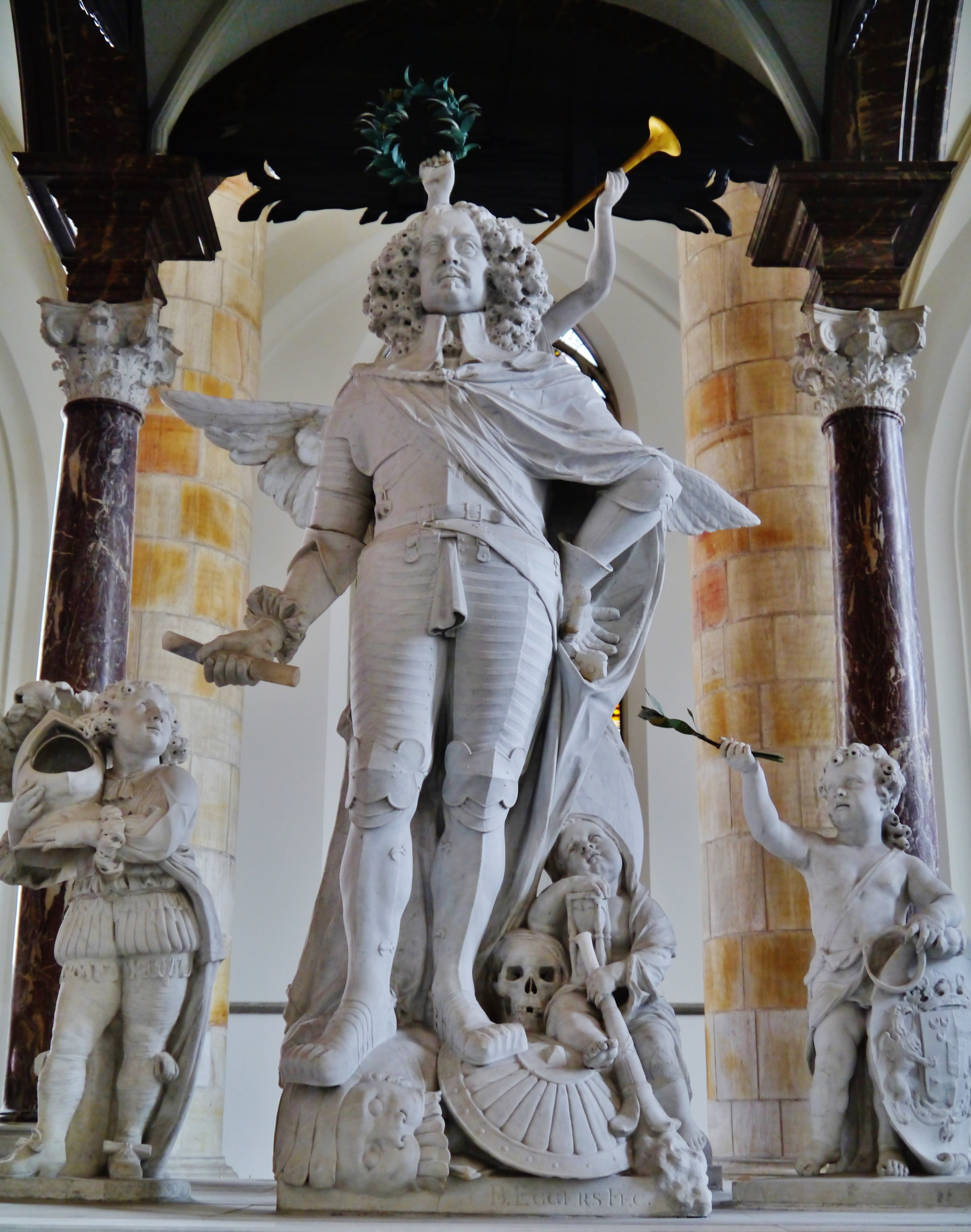
Cenotaph of Jacob van Wassenaer, St James Church, The Hague

His master Verbrugghen was the founder of an important sculpture workshop in Antwerp and the brother-in-law of the leading Antwerp sculptor Artus Quellinus the Elder. After studying in Italy where he had worked in the workshop of his compatriot François Duquesnoy, Quellinus had returned to Antwerp in 1640. He had brought with him a new vision of the role of the sculptor. The sculptor was no longer to be an ornamentalist but a creator of a total artwork in which architectural components were replaced by sculptures. He saw the church furniture that he was commissioned to make as an occasion for creating large-scale compositions, incorporated into the church interior. From 1650 onwards, Quellinus worked for fifteen years on the new city hall in Amsterdam together with the lead architect Jacob van Campen. Now called the Royal Palace on the Dam, this construction project, and in particular the marble decorations that Quellinus and his workshop produced, became an example for other buildings in Amsterdam. Quellinus invited many sculptors from his native Antwerp to assist him in the realisation of this project, many of whom such as his cousin Artus Quellinus II, Rombout Verhulst and Gabriël Grupello would become leading sculptors in their own right. Eggers was also one of the sculptors who left Antwerp to work in Amsterdam some time between 1650 and 1654 to participate in this large-scale project. His exact contributions cannot be identified as this was a collaborative effort. The sculptural decorations in the Amsterdam city hall established the international reputation of Quellinus and his workshop and would lead to many more foreign commissions for the Quellinus workshop including in Germany, Denmark and England. This helped further spread the Flemish Baroque idiom in Europe.

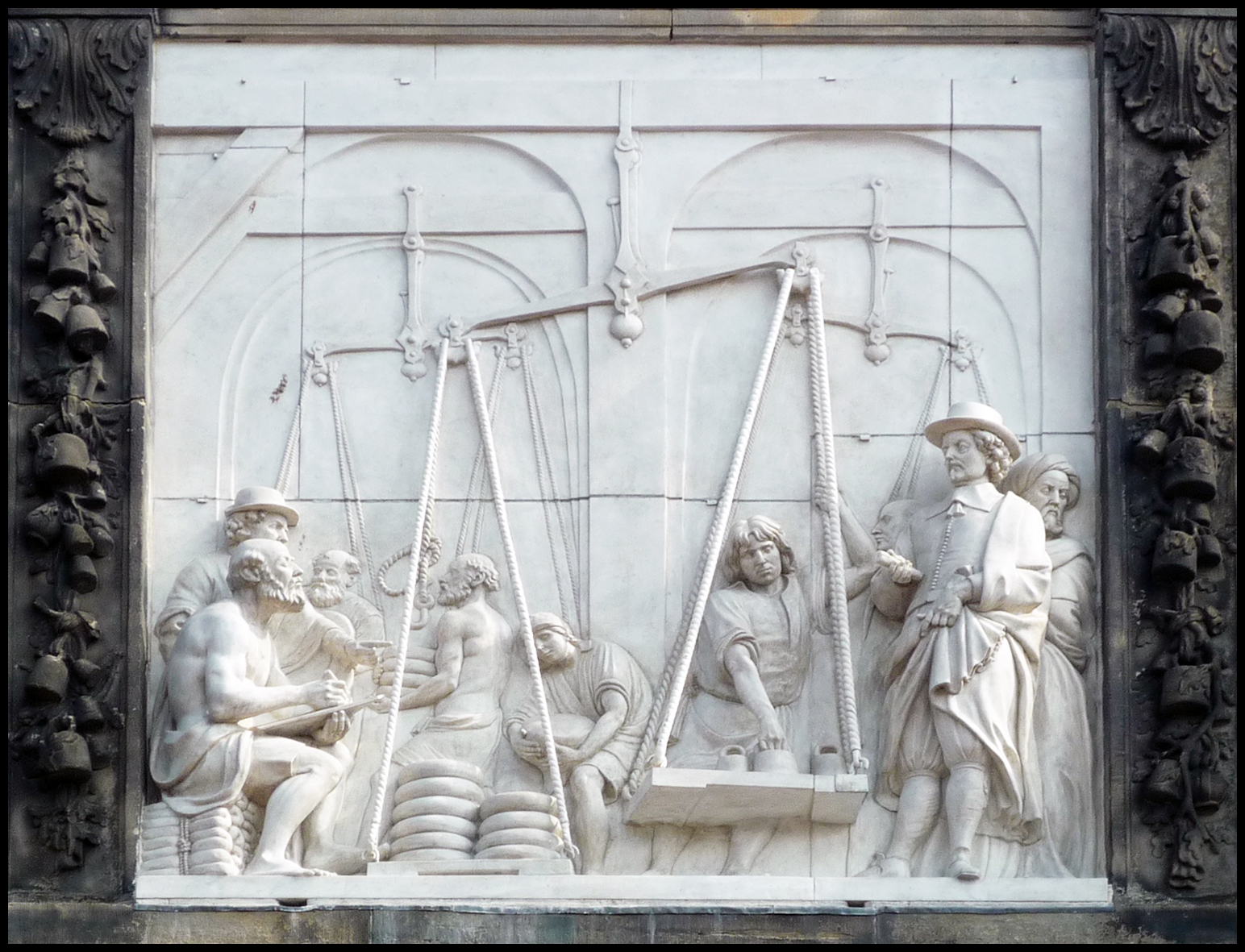
Relief of the Waag in Gouda

Eggers remained in Quellinus' workshop until 1663, the year in which he registered as a master in the Amsterdam Guild of Saint Luke and started to work as an independent master. The same year he was able to secure an important commission from Frederick William, Elector of Brandenburg, possibly at the recommendation of John Maurice, Prince of Nassau-Siegen who resided in The Hague and was likely already one of his patrons. In 1664 Prince John Maurice ordered a marble bust portrait of himself for the garden of the Mauritshuis, the Prince's residence in the Hague. The Prince had the original moved to the burial chamber (Fürstengruft) in Siegen which he had built for himself in 1670. In 1986 a copy of the statue made in plastic was placed inside the Mauritshuis, which is now a museum. The bust was removed from the Mauritshuis in 2017 amidst controversy over Holland's colonial history and Prince John Maurice's role in the slave trade. The Mauritshuis museum has denied that the removal had anything to do with the controversy and has stated that the decision was taken on the grounds that the object was solely a copy made of plastic and the museum was unable to offer the necessary historical context for it in the foyer of the Mauritshuis where it was exhibited.

Another important commission for Eggers was that for the monument of Jacob van Wassenaer Obdam, admiral of the Dutch fleet, who was killed in 1665 in the Battle of Lowestoft against the English. Eggers beat out the sculptor Rombout Verhulst in a competition for the commission written out by the States General of the Dutch Republic. Eggers likely moved to The Hague to complete the monument that was created for the St James Church in The Hague as he was registered as a master of the Guild of Saint Luke of the Hague in 1665. The monument was completed in 1667.

In the years 1668 and 1669 Eggers worked on a relief showing people weighing cheese that was made for the facade of the Waag (weigh-house) in Gouda. By the 1670s Eggers had returned to Amsterdam. Here he married Margreta Ruytiers (born 1651) on 19 February 1672. The couple had in 1674 a surviving daughter named Johanna Margaretha who later married Cornelis Stichter, a publisher and bookseller.

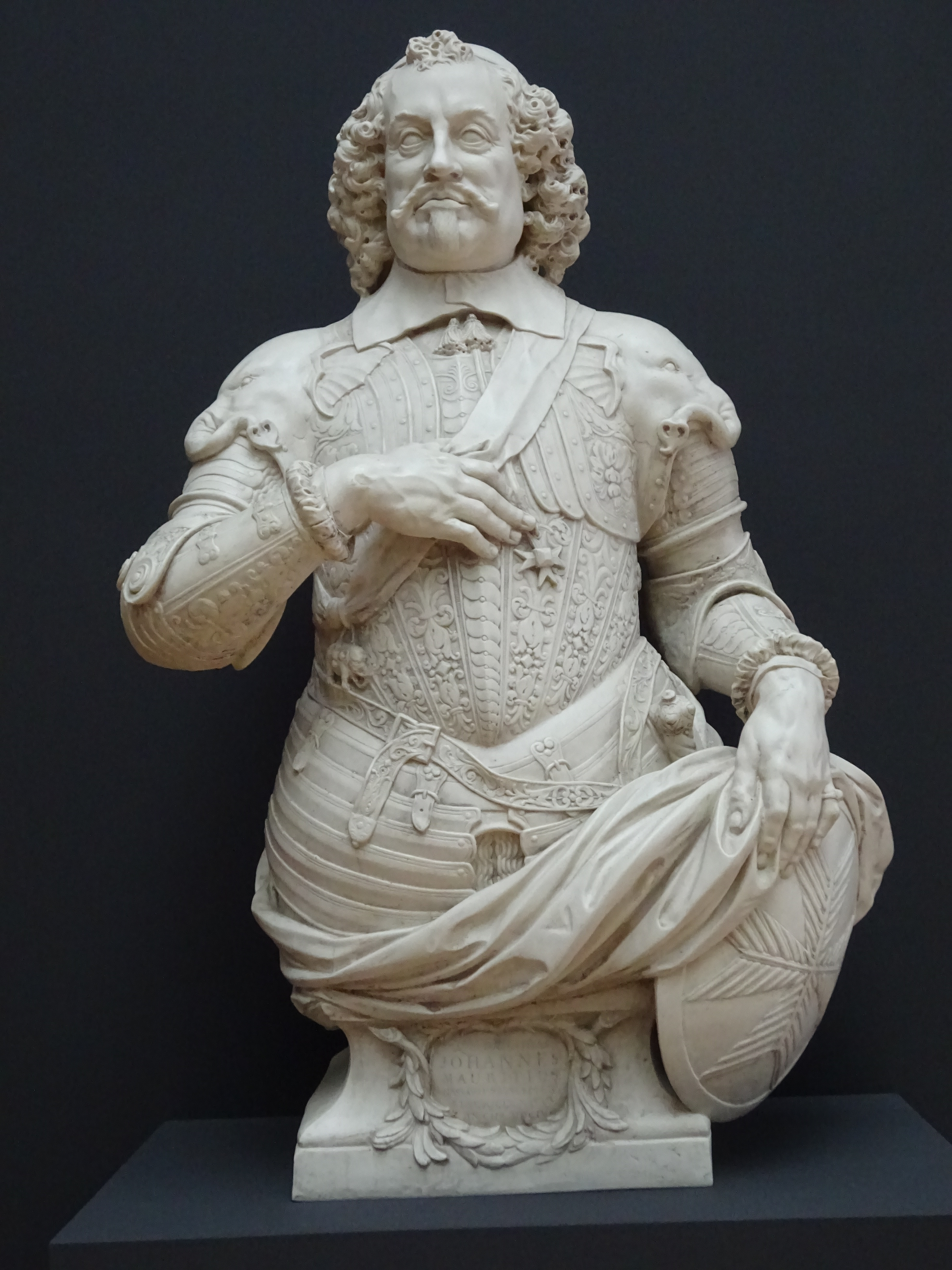
Portrait of John Maurice, Prince of Nassau-Siegen (copy)

Eggers continued to receive commissions from local and foreign patrons, both aristocratic as civil. The Elector of Brandenburg as well as Prince John Maurice remained important patrons. He made alterations to the tomb of Carl Hieronymus Baron of In- en Kniphuizen and Anna van Ewsum made by Rombout Verhulst in the Dutch Reformed church in Midwolde. He added a statue of Georg Wilhelm van In- en Kniphuizen, Anna's second husband. In 1687 and 1688 he worked in Berlin to complete marble statues of twelve Electors of Brandenburg and four ancient and medieval emperors for the Berlin Palace.

It is believed he died before 23 February 1692, probably in Amsterdam.

== Works ==
Eggers was a versatile sculptor who worked in marble, stone and terracotta. He created mainly portrait statutes of contemporary sitters or historical figures, decorative architectural elements and statues, funerary sculptures, reliefs and statues of children and allegorical, biblical and mythological sculptures.

The monument of Jacob van Wassenaer Obdam was one of his early masterpieces that secured him many of his subsequent commissions. It is now believed that posthumous claims that the design for the monument was by Cornelis Moninx and not by Eggers himself are not substantiated. In this commission Eggers chose to use the device of the canopy, which already had been used by Hendrick de Keyser for the tomb of William of Orange. The monument includes a standing portrait of van Wassenaer, thus comparing the admiral with heroes from Antiquity. The figure group behind the hero, consisting of an allegory of Fame and an eagle with a globe and thunderbolts in its claws further emphasizes the notion of an apotheosis of the hero. The monument shows that Eggers was clear about the propagandistic intent of the States General when commissioning the monument as it was to show the heroism of the citizens defending the cause of the Republic as opposed to the power of the aristocratic elite represented by the Stadtholders of Orange. Admiral van Wassenaar's reputation as a hero was intact, as an English tourist's travel diary of 1705 describes him as a valiant hero.
