= Jacob van Wassenaer Obdam =

Dutch nobleman and naval officer (1610–1665)

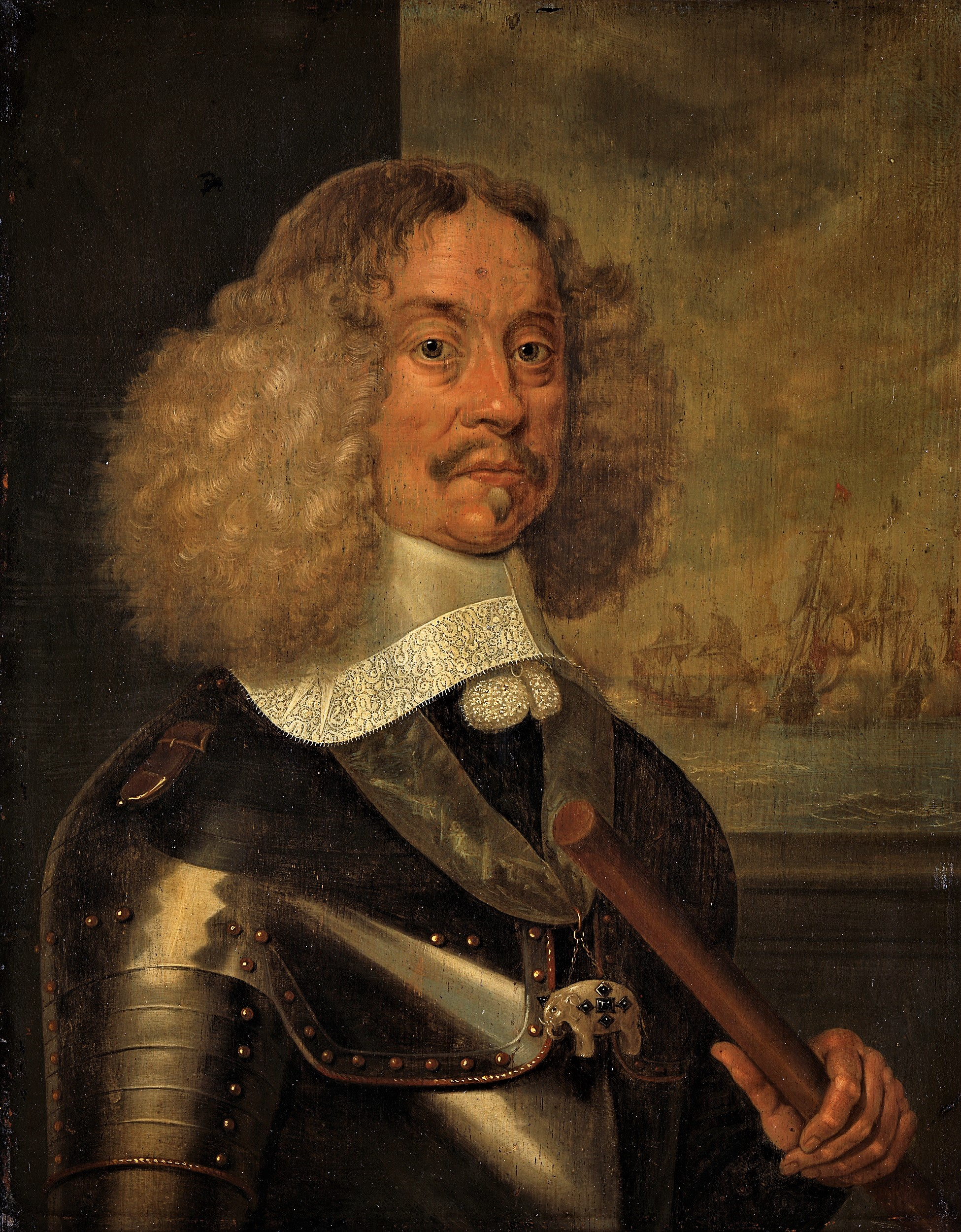
- Baron Jacob van Wassenaer Obdam
- Born: Jacob van Duvenvoorde; 1610; The Hague, Holland, Dutch Republic
- Died: 13 June 1665 (aged 54–55) near Lowestoft, England
- Burial place: Grote or Sint-Jacobskerk, The Hague
- Military career
- Allegiance: Dutch Republic
- Service years: 1631–1661
- Conflicts: Eighty Years' War; Capture of Maastricht; Second Northern War; Siege of Danzig; Battle of the Sound; Second Anglo-Dutch War; Battle of Lowestoft †
- Awards: Knight of the Elephant (1656)

Jacob van Wassenaer Obdam (1610 – 13 June 1665) was a Dutch States Navy officer and nobleman who became lieutenant admiral, and supreme commander of the Dutch navy. He had as official titles Banner Lord of Wassenaer, and Lord Obdam, Hensbroek, Spanbroek, Opmeer, Zuidwijk and Kernhem. The name Obdam was then also spelled as Opdam. Contemporary English sources typically refer to him as Admiral Opdam or Lord Obdam because it was not until 1657 that he bought the Wassenaar Estate from relatives and thus acquired its title. Modern Dutch sources sometimes less correctly insert a second "van" between "Wassenaer" and "Obdam" or use the modern spelling "Wassenaar".

== Early life ==
Jacob was born in 1610, the eldest son of Lieutenant-Admiral Jacob van Wassenaer Duivenvoorde, born 1574, and Anna van Randerode. After early military training, he joined the army and, in 1631, commanded a company of cavalry, soon rising to the rank of colonel. In this capacity, he took part in several sieges and was commended for his bravery fighting against the Spanish at the siege of Maastricht in 1632, and in 1643 he became drost (political governor) of Heusden, an important fortress town, and soon after military governor of its garrison.

In 1647, when the provinces of Gelderland and Overijssel proposed peace with Spain, Van Wassenaer was delegated by the majority of provinces that wished to continue the war in alliance with France to visit the two provinces, and he succeeded in convincing them to continue to fight. In 1648, in another mission on behalf, this time, of all the Netherlands provinces, he attended the baptism at Kleve of the eldest son of Frederick William of Brandenburg, and in 1651 he visited Frederick William at Düsseldorf to discuss a possible military alliance.

On 28 April 1633, at Maarssen, he married Agnes Renesse van der Aa and had three children by her.

== First Anglo-Dutch War ==
As a member of the nobility of Holland, Van Wassenaer was delegated to the States of Holland to represent their interests as one of the ten members of the ridderschap (the "knighthood" Estate within the States). In 1650 when stadtholder William II of Orange died, he opposed installing the latter's infant son as nominal stadtholder. His opposition to the House of Orange was based on socio-economic and religious grounds: the stadtholders had their political base in the artisan class, which consisted mainly of puritan Calvinists. Many members of the Van Wassenaer family were still Catholic and feared religious oppression.

When the First Anglo-Dutch War started in 1652 he, then a cavalry Colonel, was again delegated to the States-General. There he supported the faction of Johan de Witt and Cornelis de Graeff, which proposed to build a strong professional confederate fleet, at the expense of the army. Because his father had been Lieutenant-Admiral, and through the influence of De Witt, he was made "Delegate of the States to the National Fleet", thereby becoming responsible for all day-to-day dealings between the States-General and the navy, a position that carried much power.

Near the end of the war, in the Battle of Scheveningen, the supreme commander of the confederate Dutch fleet, Lieutenant-Admiral Maarten Tromp, was killed in action. His second in command had been Vice-Admiral Witte de With, both a courageous and competent sailor and a man seen as politically reliable as he was not a supporter of the Orangist faction. He would thus seem to have been the natural choice for a successor to Tromp. De With, however, was a brusque and quarrelsome man who had made himself profoundly disliked throughout the fleet, both by its commanders and by the ordinary seamen, to the extent that many of the former complained about him to De Witt and a few refused to serve under him, while there were desertions among the latter.

Third in command had been Vice-Admiral Johan Evertsen, a brave sailor much admired by his men. However, Evertsen held his appointment from the Admiralty of Zeeland. As Holland was not only the richest Dutch province but the home of three of the five Dutch admiralties, including the two largest, its politicians and flag officers were not prepared to be subordinated to an admiral from one of the smaller Admiralties. He had also been a personal friend of the late stadtholder and was known to be a supporter of the plan to make his infant son stadtholder. Evertsen had also been accused by de With of cowardice when, during the Battle of Scheveningen he had withdrawn in his damaged ship rather than moving his flag to another vessel.

The Admiralty of Amsterdam and the Admiralty of the Noorderkwartier both suggested Michiel de Ruyter even though his rank was only that of Commodore. De Witt took this recommendation seriously, but de Ruyter steadfastly declined to be considered for the post. As de With and Evertsen were unacceptable and de Ruyter had ruled himself out, De Witt turned to alternatives, without naval experience but with experience of command and the prestige of belonging to the Dutch nobility. The first candidate to be approached, Louis of Nassau-Beverweerd, an illegitimate son of Maurice, Prince of Orange and experienced military commander who had agreed to cooperate with the republican administration of Johan de Witt and the regents of the Dutch cities, becoming First Noble of Holland, declined but recommended his fellow noble, Van Wassenaer. De Witt was also impressed by the performance of English army officers as Generals at Sea and, also influenced by the performance of earlier Dutch military men as sea officers, he finally proposed Van Wassenaer, who was a political ally to take over command. Van Wassenaer at first refused, then made his acceptance conditional on his appointment as full Admiral, a post normally reserved for a Prince of Orange, not merely Lieutenant-Admiral. De Witt finally pressured him to accept by threatening to appoint a foreigner as Lieutenant-Admiral to command the Dutch fleet.

== New tactics ==
In 1654, the Dutch Navy found a new commander in Jacob van Wassenaer Obdam, Lieutenant-Admiral of Holland and West Frisia. He admitted to his lack of naval experience, and requested the appointment of a "counsellor and assistant"' to deal with naval tactics, while his own high rank, personal qualities and fighting reputation would allow him to prevent disputes between the various flag officers and captains. De Ruyter was persuaded to act as his counsellor after persuasion by De Witt.

He had to solve the fundamental problem facing the Dutch fleet in that century: how to beat an enemy who was equipped with much more powerful ships. As the Dutch home waters were so shallow building very heavy ships was out of the question.

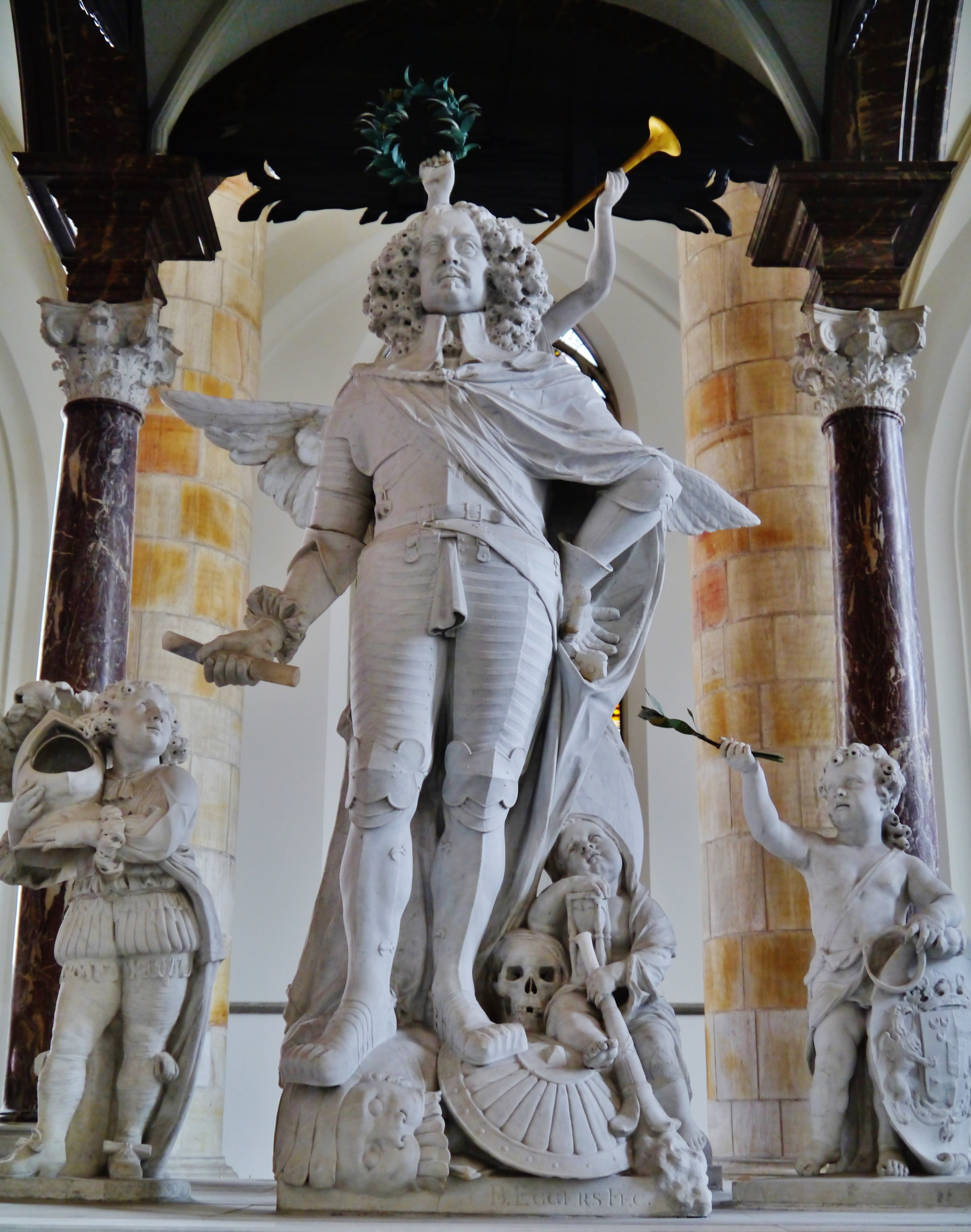
Cenotaph of Jacob van Wassenaer by Bartholomeus Eggers, St James Church, The Hague

Although De Witt had convinced the States General to spend four million guilders in agreeing to building sixty new warships to augment the existing fleet in the First Anglo-Dutch War, including several comparable to the all but the largest English ships and much heavier than the average existing Dutch warship, many were relatively small convoy escorts of 44 cannon, little more than frigates by English standards, and not all those planned had been completed or fitted out by 1665.

Before the Anglo-Dutch wars, the typical solution when fighting Spanish galleons had always been the direct attack having the weather gauge, using superior maneuverability and numbers, or if that failed: employing fireships and boarding. Against the English however this was generally unsuccessful; they were at least as competent in these aggressive tactics and they had too many ships. Maarten Tromp then tried an informal line of battle, but this ploy came back with a vengeance. Robert Blake created a very formal version that worked even better for the English as they had powerful ships and a more professional navy, while the Dutch employed many armed merchants.

Studying Blake's Sailing and Fighting Instructions Van Wassenaer saw a new solution to the old problem. Now that a professional Dutch Navy was being created, this navy would soon be the equal in competence of the English. That left only the inequality in firepower to be solved. He understood that this could be achieved by abandoning the traditional aggressive stance and embracing defence. Sailing in a battle line in a defensive leeward position, the wind, blowing from the side of the enemy, would give the guns of the Dutch ships a higher elevation and therefore a better range. That same wind would decrease the range of the enemy ships or even force them to close the gun ports of their lower gun deck, the one that carried the heaviest guns. This became Van Wassenaer's favorite method: to damage the enemy ships from a safe distance and then disengage. Whether the enemy was destroyed or his own fleet damaged too was immaterial as, with their superior shipbuilding capacity the Dutch could always make quicker repairs. Simply keeping the enemy fleet inoperational would suffice. Dutch trade wouldn't be disturbed and while a few battles might well deplete the enemy's treasury, the Republic would always have plenty of reserves. In Van Wassenaer's opinion, naval warfare was a gigantic battle of attrition that the Dutch were guaranteed to win.

== Northern Wars ==
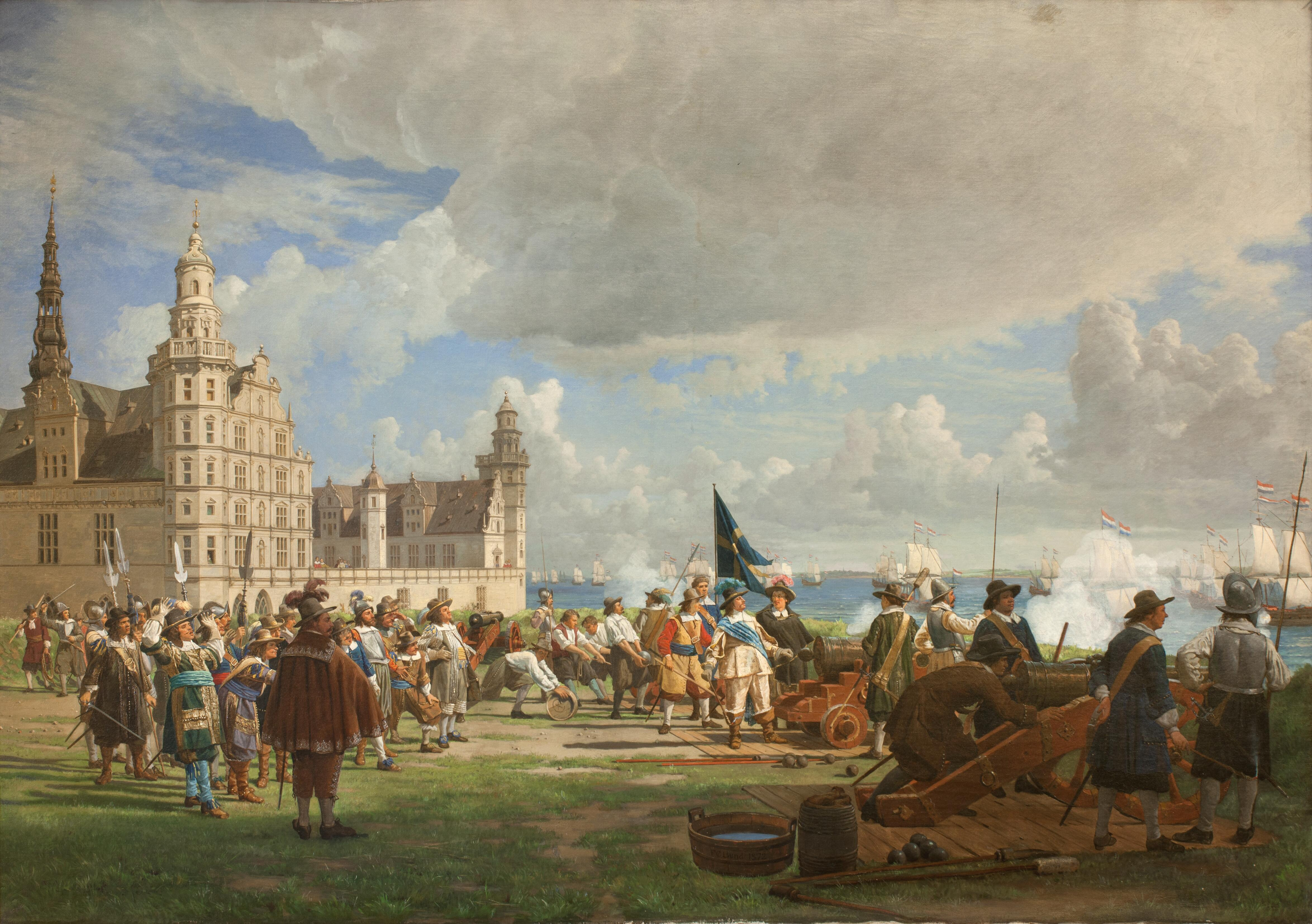
The Dutch fleet, led by admiral Obdam, enters the Sound on October 29, 1658

In 1655, Charles X of Sweden began a series of aggressive campaigns (part of the Northern Wars) intending to make Sweden the dominant power in the Baltic. The Dutch saw this as a threat to their vital interests. Although they are today better known for their exploitation of the East Indies, in fact, their Baltic trade was more profitable in absolute terms. Also, the Republic was critically dependent on Scandinavian wood to build ships and Polish grain to feed its large urban population.

When Charles conquered Poland, Amsterdam under his regent Cornelis de Graeff supported the subsequent rebellion and sent Obdam with a fleet to relieve Danzig in 1656 In 1657, Van Wassenaer blockaded Lisbon and captured fifteen ships of a Portuguese sugar fleet, but, in 1658, had to return to the Baltic as the situation there had grown even more critical.

After the failure of his Polish campaign Charles had turned his attention on Denmark and had invaded Jutland from Germany. He then made peace with Frederick III of Denmark but treacherously broke it a few weeks later in an attempt to take Copenhagen by assault. This failed and he laid siege to the Danish capital, the last part of his kingdom still under Frederick's control.

After much deliberation the States-General decided to send the entire active Dutch fleet and a mercenary army to relieve the Danes. On 8 November 1658, the Dutch defeated the heavier Swedish ships in the Battle of the Sound. During this battle, Witte de With who commanded the Dutch van was first to attack the Swedes, but his ship was boarded and he was killed, although his captured ship sank almost immediately. Van Wassenaer commanding the centre and the whole fleet in the Dutch flagship Eendragt attacked the Swedish commander, Gustaf Wrangel, and was, in turn, attacked and surrounded by several Swedish ships and only got clear after several Dutch ships came to his aid. Much of the direction of the Dutch attack resulted from the tactical skill of Van Wassenaer's flag captain Egbert Bartholomeuszoon Kortenaer, whose presence was missed in later battles when he was promoted to flag rank. Van Wassenaer remained in command of the Dutch fleet during the winter of 1659. however, as the Swedes had been reinforced by a strong English fleet under Edward Montague giving this combined fleet superiority, ne remained largely inactive until reinforced by a squadron commanded by Vice-Admiral De Ruyter. In the summer of 1659, Obdam, de Ruyter and Johan Evertsen, either jointly or in separate squadrons assisted in the liberation of the Danish Isles, greatly assisted by the withdrawal of the English fleet. Van Wassenaer and most of the Dutch fleet left Danish waters in late October once this task had been almost completed, leaving De Ruyter with a small squadron until the terms peace was agreed.

== Second Anglo-Dutch War ==
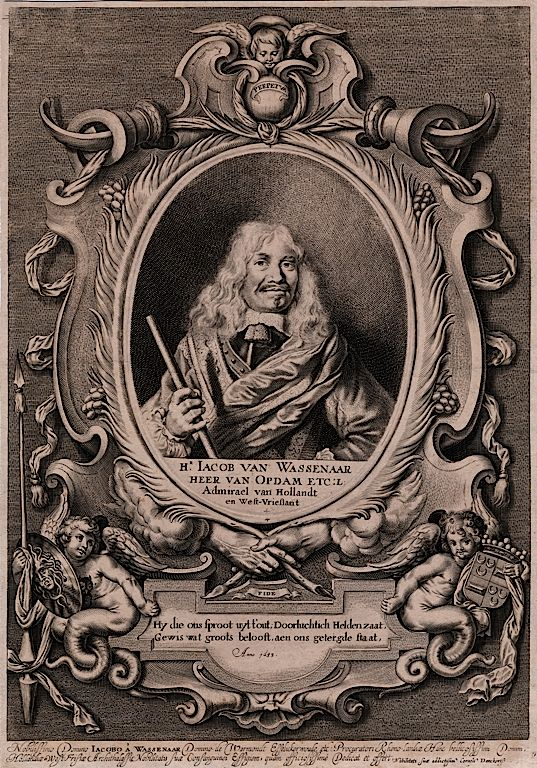
Michiel Mozyn, Portrait of Jacob van Wassenaar, 1653, engraving

The First and Second Anglo-Dutch wars arose from a combination of commercial and maritime rivalry religious and political differences between England and the Netherlands (the Third Anglo-Dutch War, however, was less consequent upon commercial rivalry: while Oliver Cromwell wished to prevent any member of the House of Orange becoming stadtholder or holding any other public office in the Netherlands; whereas following the Stuart Restoration, Charles II of England tried to promote his nephew William as a possible stadtholder.).

Although the Second Anglo-Dutch War resulted from long-standing commercial tensions between England and the Netherlands that had escalated from 1664, following English provocations in North America and West Africa, diplomatic negotiations to avoid the outbreak of war failed, largely because a group of ambitious English politicians and naval officers frustrated these efforts to reach any accommodation between the two parties.

A new ad hoc building programme was started in 1664, soon followed by an official plan at a price of eight million guilders to build sixty heavier ships of 60 to 70 cannon (so as to completely replace the core of the fleet) in the years 1665-67. At the start of the Second Anglo-Dutch War, as well as some of the newer ships, Oddam's fleet included eighteen older warships that were reactivated after being laid up after the First Anglo-Dutch war, and several large Dutch East India Company built hybrid ships. These last could be used for carrying cargo, as convoy escorts or in battle, although they were not as strongly built as pure warships.

The war commenced with a declaration of war by the Dutch on 4 March 1665, which followed English attacks on two Dutch convoys, one off Cadiz and the other in the English Channel. At the start of the war, both sides considered an early decisive battle was desirable, as English government finances could not sustain a long war, and an English blockade of Dutch ports and attacks on their merchant and fishing fleets would soon bring their economic ruin. After an early English blockade in April and May was broken off through its ships' lack of supplies, the Dutch were desperate to prevent a second blockade. The Grand Pensionary and leading Dutch politician, Johan de Witt and other members of the States-General, formed a commission to supervise Obdam, and gave him detailed instructions comprising 26 articles, ordering to attack the English aggressively when and where he could do them most damage. However, these instructions gave Obdam little guidance on how he should do so.

The same instructions issued by the commission headed by De Witt insisted on specifying that the Dutch fleet's order of battle should involve its division into a seven squadrons with a total of 21 flag officers for political reasons. Each of the five Dutch admiralties had its own set of flag officers, and each of the three smaller admiralties insisted on having its own squadron, so the larger the Admiralties of Amsterdam and the Maas then split their forces in two squadrons each. This resulted in seven squadrons, each with three flag officers; several were led by Lieutenant Admirals of equal rank to Van Wassenaer, who commanded his own squadron as well as the whole fleet. In addition, several squadrons had ships or flag officers from more than one admiralty, complicating their chain of command.

Although Van Wassenaer commanded what was the largest Dutch fleet up to that date, he was deeply unhappy with it, and in a meeting De Witt he pointed out that this fleet lacked any unity. As the Mediterranean Fleet had been sent to West Africa under de Ruyter, only half of the home fleet now consisted of professional ships; the remainder of disparate vessels either too old or too new and all poorly trained, manned by sailors from all over Scandinavia, Eastern Europe and Asia.

Realising his fleet was still too inferior in organisation, training, discipline and firepower to challenge the English successfully in a decisive battle, Van Wassenaer was prepared only to seek a limited confrontation with his fleet in a defensive leeward position from which it could disengage quickly and return to its ports without openly disobeying orders. However, this opportunistic attitude and lack of a clear strategic plan was a significant cause of his defeat and death.

Van Wassenaer took to sea and soon intercepted an English convoy from Hamburg, capturing nine merchant ships. De Witt sent letters to the fleet, not to congratulate Van Wassenaer with his success but to instruct him to move away from the Dutch coast and attack the English fleet. On 11 June, an English ship sighted the Dutch fleet sailing west on a light breeze, but a turning tide and a near calm forced the English fleet to anchor, and the Dutch did not attack but avoided battle. Van Wassenaer had clear orders to fight and intended to do so, but not when an easterly breeze would prevent the Dutch fleet from retreating if it were outfought: his waiting for a westerly breeze may have saved the bulk of the Dutch fleet from destruction by allowing its withdrawal after battle. On 12 June the wind again blew from the east, and again Obdam declined to attack, despite holding the weather gage. The two fleets sailed westward for most of the day, but overnight the wind veered southerly, then southwesterly, in direction overnight and strengthened by dawn, so Van Wassenaer decided to attack.

It is impossible to know what Van Wassenaer's intentions were, as he did not survive the battle. He has been accused of lack both of leadership and tactical insight, and it is claimed he had only succeeded in earlier battles when Egbert Bartholomeusz Kortenaer was his flag captain. Kortenaer had been promoted and, as a lieutenant-admiral at Lowestoft, so could no longer advise Van Wassenaer. However, Obdam's tactical decisions may relate to his appreciation that his out-gunned and poorly organised fleet could only succeed in battle under ideal conditions, and it needed to be able to disengage if it risked defeat.

Although the Dutch fleet was able to withstand English attacks for several hours, it soon lost cohesion when trying to match the English fleet's manoeuvers, and several less enthusiastic captains and older ships failed to fight effectively in formation. In the afternoon the Dutch Fleet was trapped by the Blue squadron (or rear) of the English fleet. This Battle of Lowestoft turned into the worst naval defeat in Dutch history. The Dutch flagship Eendragt duelled her counterpart HMS Royal Charles and exploded. Van Wassenaer was not among the five survivors. One report stated that just before the explosion he was swept from the deck by an English cannonball fired across the ship.

The loss of the flagship and death of Van Wassenaer, just as the English Blue and White squadrons were attacking, seriously affected Dutch morale, further damaged by the uncertainty over his successor. Egbert Kortenaer had been nominated to be Van Wassenaer's successor before the battle, but had been fatally wounded and was incapable of command. However, his flag captain kept Kortenaer's admiral's flag and, unnerved by the explosion of the Eendracht, he fled the battle with many ships following what appeared to be their leader's flag. The next most senior admiral, Johan Evertsen of Zeeland, then claimed that he commanded the fleet, but Cornelis Tromp, the senior Amsterdam officer also claimed command, so three ships confusingly claimed to be fleet flagship.

The Dutch fleet had lost all cohesion by around 6pm, and only the actions Evertsen, Tromp and the few ships that continued fighting with them allowed other Dutch ships to gain a headstart on any English pursuit. But for them opposing the English fleet for two or three hours, many damaged Dutch ships would have been captured. The heavy defeat caused a national outrage. Trying to explain his commander's behavior captain Tjerk Hiddes de Vries, soon to be promoted to Lieutenant-Admiral of Frisia, wrote about the causes of the defeat: "In the first place God Almighty robbed our supreme commander of his senses — or never gave him any to begin with."

Like any Dutch Admiral killed in action Jacob van Wassenaer Obdam was given a marble grave memorial, in this case, of course, a cenotaph. It is in The Hague, in the Old Church. His son, also named Jacob van Wassenaer Obdam, was a military commander in the War of the Spanish Succession.

== Bibliography ==
- Anderson, Roger C. (1910) Naval Wars in the Baltic during the Sailing Ship era, 1522 to 1850. Gilbert Wood
- Bruijn, Jaap R. (2011). The Dutch Navy of the Seventeenth and Eighteenth Centuries. Oxford University Press. ISBN 978-0-98649-735-3
- Edmundson, George (2013). History of Holland. Cambridge University Press. ISBN 978-1-10766-089-2.
- Fox, Frank L. (2018). The Four Days' Battle of 1666. Seaforth. ISBN 978-1-52673-727-4.
- Rommelse, Gijs (2006). The Second Anglo-Dutch War (1665-1667): Raison D'état, Mercantilism and Maritime Strife. Uitgeverij Verloren. ISBN 978-9-065-50907-9.
- Rommelse, Gijs (2010). The Role of Mercantilism in Anglo-Dutch political relations, 1650-74. The Economic History Review, Vol. 63 No 3, pp. 591–611.
- Rowen, Herbert Harvey (2015). John de Witt, Grand Pensionary of Holland, 1625-1672. Princeton University Press. ISBN 978-0-98649-735-3
- Van der Aa, A. J. (1877) Biographisch woordenboek der Nederlanden Vol 26. van Brederode.
- Warnsinck, J. C. M. (1942) Van Vloot Voogden en Zeeslagen. Kampen & Zoon

Military offices
Preceded by Maarten Tromp	Supreme Commander of the Dutch Navy	Succeeded by Michiel de Ruyter
