= Midwolde =

Midwolde Midwolle (Gronings)
- Village
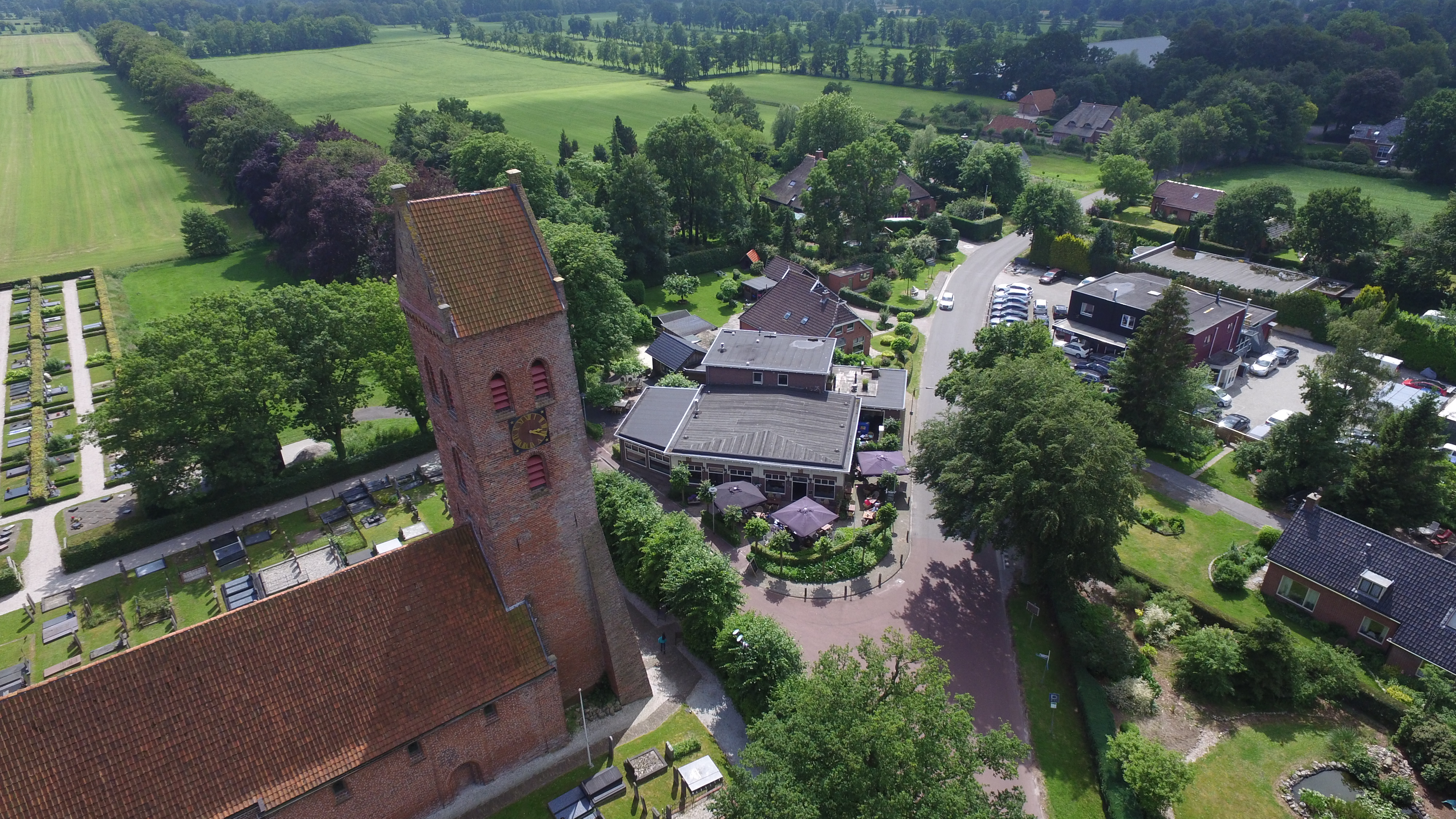
- View of Midwolde

- Location in the province of Groningen in the Netherlands Midwolde (Netherlands)
- Coordinates: 53°11′N 6°24′E
- Country: Netherlands
- Province: Groningen
- Municipality: Westerkwartier
- Elevation: 1.7 m (5.6 ft)

Population (2021)
  - Total: 185
- Time zone: UTC+1 (CET)
  - Summer (DST): UTC+2 (CEST)
- Postcode: 9355
- Area code: 0594

Midwolde (Dutch: [mɪtˈʋɔldə]; Gronings: Midwolle) is a village in the municipality of Westerkwartier in the province of Groningen in the Netherlands. As of 2021, it had a population of 185. It is located just to the northeast of Leek.

Midwolde is known for its church, the oldest part of which (the nave) dates from the 12th century. The church is located north of the Nienoord estate and therefore had close relations with it in the past. In the church is the tomb of Carel Hieronymus von Inn- und Kniphausen (1631-1664), a major work by Rombout Verhulst and Bartholomeus Eggers. A stained glass window recalls the accident in 1907 in which the Van Panhuys family drowned in the Hoendiep.

The name means: forest (wold) in the middle (mid-). The name is very similar to that of Midwolda, which is located in the east of the province of Groningen in the municipality of Oldambt and which is much larger.

== Gallery ==
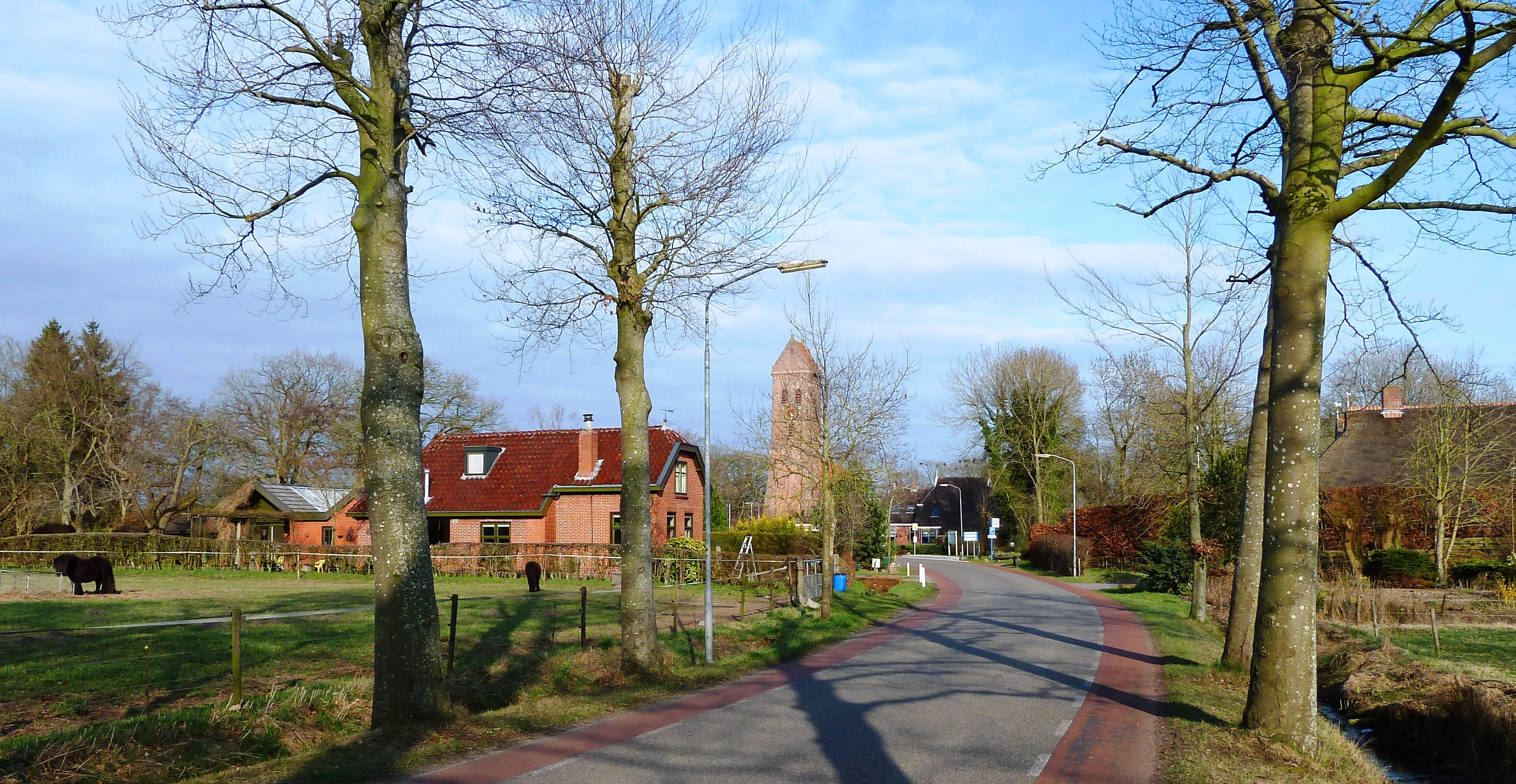
Villagescape

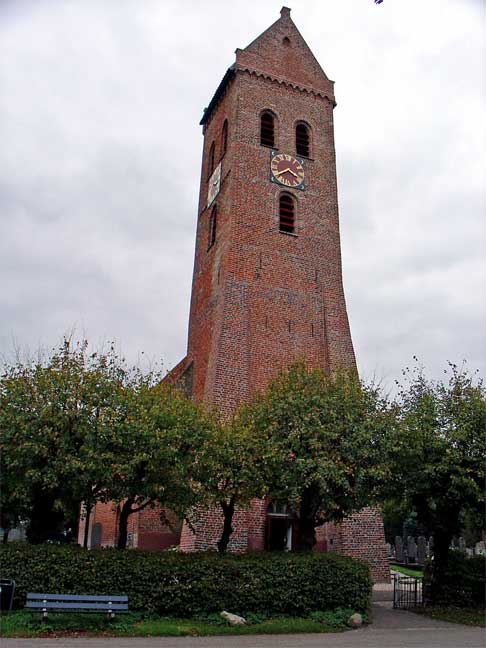
Church of Midwolde

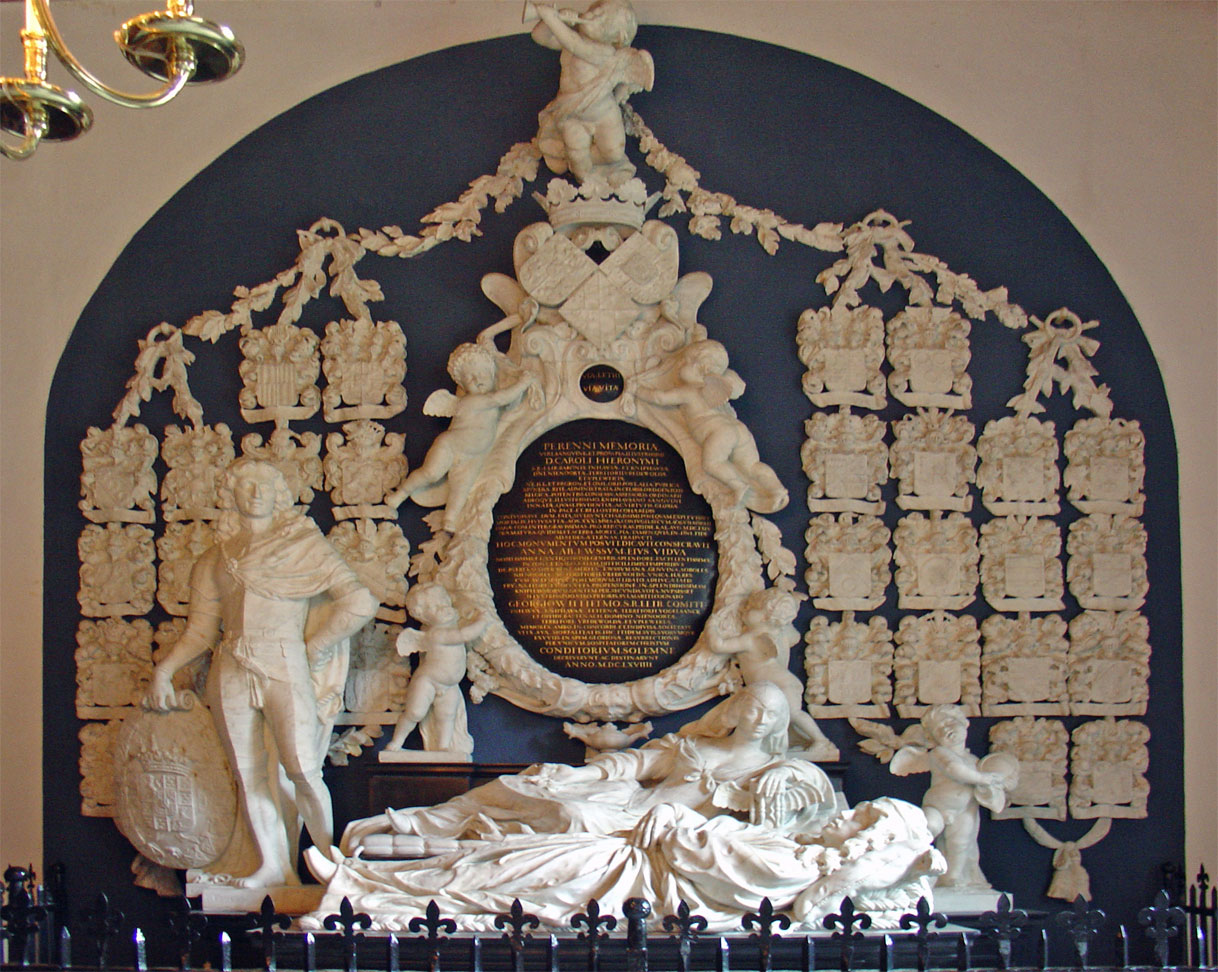
Tomb in the church
