= Grote or Sint-Jacobskerk (The Hague) =

Great Church or St. James's Church
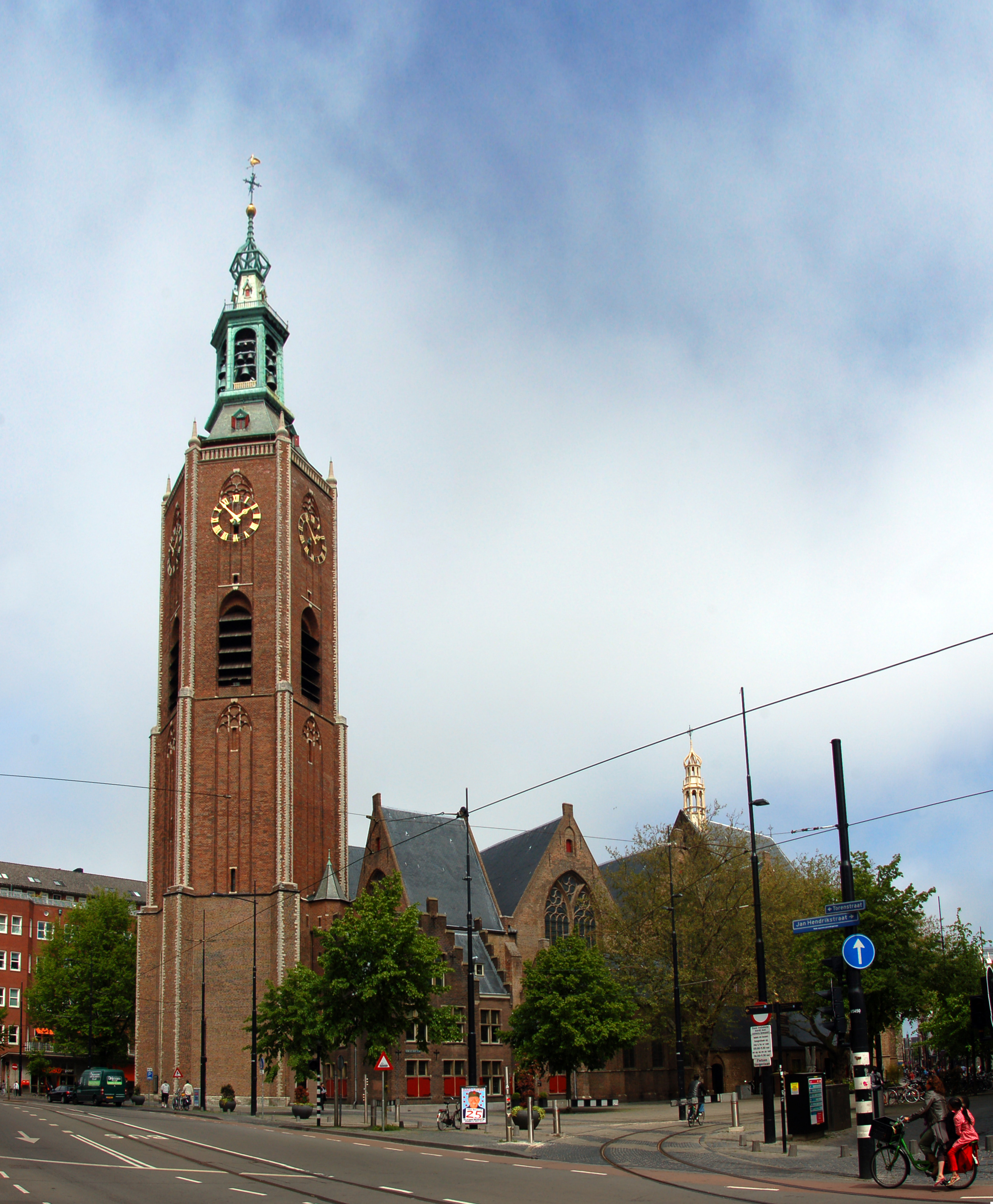
- Great Church or St. James's Church
- 52°04′38″N 4°18′26″E
- Location: The Hague
- Country: Netherlands
- Denomination: Reformed Protestant, though no longer in use for regular religious services, except for royal baptisms and weddings
- Previous denomination: Dutch Reformed Church, since 1574 (the Reformation), before that Catholic Church

History
- Status: Church
- Founded: 13th century
- Dedication: James, son of Zebedee (until the Reformation in 1574)

Architecture
- Heritage designation: Rijksmonument
- Designated: 1967
- Architectural type: Church
- Style: Gothic
- Years built: 14th–16th centuries

Specifications
- Materials: Brick

The Great Church or St. James's Church (Dutch: Grote- of Sint-Jacobskerk, pronounced [ˌɣroːtə ʔɔf sɪɲˈtɕaːkɔpsˌkɛr(ə)k]) is a landmark Reformed Protestant church in The Hague, Netherlands. The building is located on the Torenstraat, named for its high tower. Together with the Binnenhof, it is one of the oldest buildings in The Hague. Members of the House of Orange-Nassau have been baptised and married there. The latest are King Willem-Alexander of the Netherlands and his daughter and heir apparent Catharina-Amalia, Princess of Orange.

== History ==
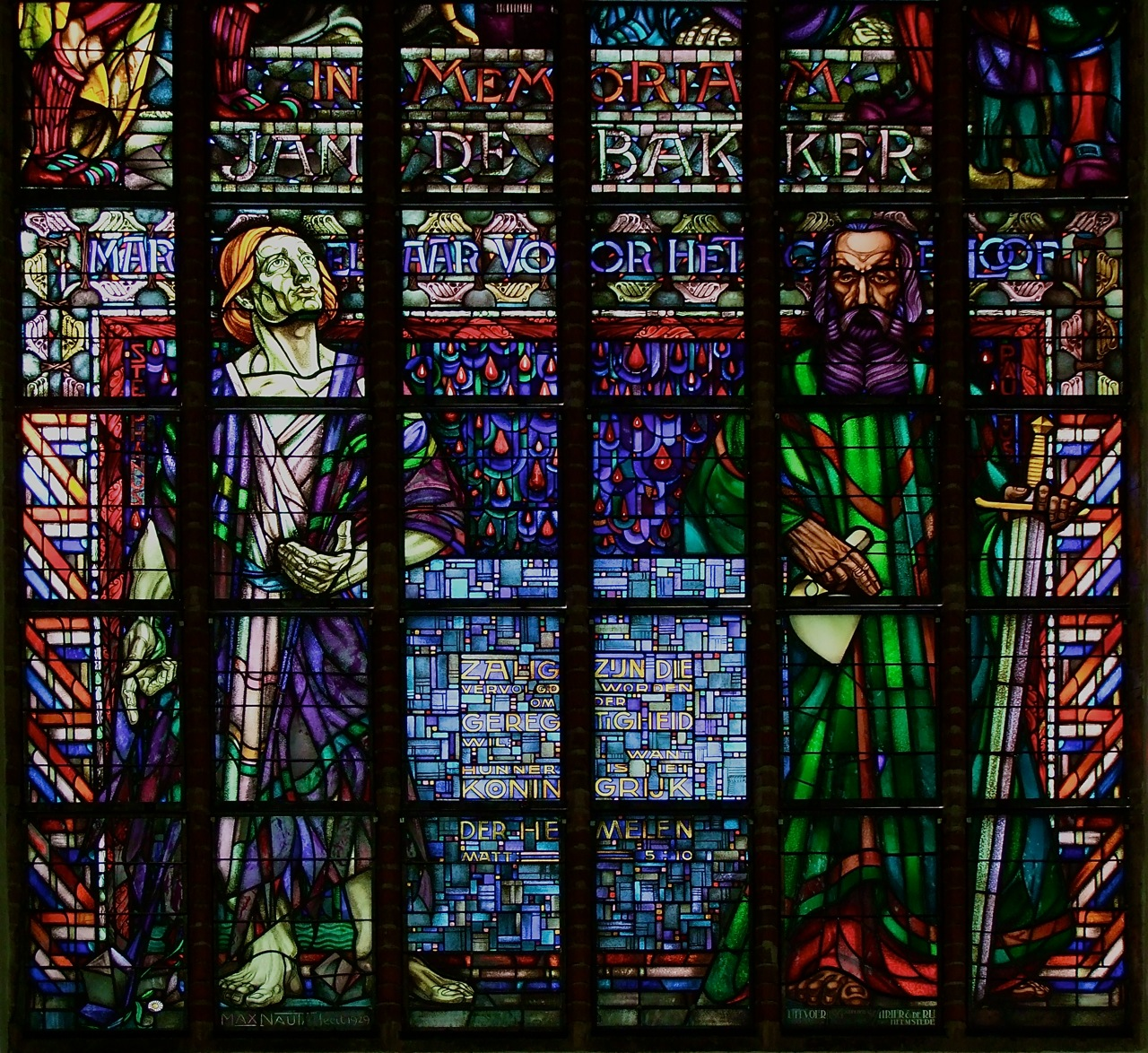
Stained glass window to commemorate the martyr Jan de Bakker, designed by Max Nauta, created by glaziers 'Schrier en De Ru' in Haarlem, 1930

The Great, or St. James's Church, was founded in the late 13th century, probably as a wooden church. The present church was built in stages, between the 14th and 16th century. First in the year 1337, sources speak of the "great church" (Dutch: grote kercke), which is a typical historical indication of a brick structure. It has a fine vaulted interior, and contains some old stained glass, a carved wooden pulpit (1550), a large organ and interesting sepulchral monuments, and 34 escutcheons of the knights of the Order of the Golden Fleece, placed here after the chapter of 1456. During excavations in 2009 archeologists determined that some basement walls were built with bricks which they could date between the year 1320 and 1350. Documents from the year 1399, referring to maintenance work on the church, show that by then the church was a brick construction.

The stone church was originally built as a cruciform church. In the facade adjacent to the tower, there are still traces of the roof line of 1424. They show a nave with two lower aisles. Between 1434 and 1455, both lower aisles were broadened and raised to the roof level of the nave, consequently losing the cross shape. This expansion made the St. James Church of The Hague the first example in the Low Countries of the so-called "Hague Hall church", a type of hall church. From that time onwards, this type of church would be applied on a larger scale, especially in the County of Holland.

The church is remarkable for its fine tower and chime of bells, and contains the cenotaph monument of Jacob van Wassenaer Obdam, designed and sculpted by Bartholomeus Eggers in 1667, and the renaissance tomb of Gerrit van Assendelft (1487–1558). Also notable is the late Baroque tomb of Philip, Landgrave of Hesse-Philippsthal and his wife Catherine of Solms-Laubach, designed by Daniel Marot in 1721. The church's six-sided tower was finished between 1420 and 1424. The tower, 93 m (305 ft 1 in) tall, is one of the tallest in the Netherlands. There are 34 panels with shields and names of knights of the golden fleece. The richly carved wooden pulpit was made in 1550. The mechanical clock has 15 bells by M. de Haze in 1686, one by Jasper and Jan Moer from 1541, one from H. Van Trier from 1570, one by Coenraat Wegewaert from 1647, and one from C. Fremy from 1692 and 31 modern bells. In the church tower there is an automatic carillon by Libertus van den Burgh, from 1689. In the tower the mechanical clock was installed in 1927. The clock with drum by Heynrick Vabrie that was used from 1541 to 1689 is kept in the museum 'Speelklok' in Utrecht.

The church endured a fire in 1539, and the stained glass windows were repaired by leading glass artists, including the brothers Dirk and Wouter Crabeth of Gouda. Charles V, Holy Roman Emperor, who visited the church after the fire, sponsored two windows by the Crabeths that, probably because of their royal origin, are the only two windows that have survived up to the present day. Under one of these windows lies a commemorative stone from 1857 for Constantijn and Christiaan Huygens, who were buried in unmarked graves in the choir of the church. Some notable people buried in the church are Count John Albert I of Solms-Braunfels, a cousin of William the Silent, who died in exile (buried in 1623), Rombout Hogerbeets, Dutch statesman (1625), Anthonie Duyck (in 1629), Grand Pensionary of Holland, Louis of Nassau, Lord of De Lek and Beverweerd, an illegitimate son of Maurice, Prince of Orange (in 1665), Gaspar Fagel (1668), Grand Pensionary of Holland, Lieuwe van Aitzema, a famous spy for England during the First and Second Anglo-Dutch War (buried in 1669), field marshal René de Cordeux, Marquess of Langey, a grandson of Louise de Coligny (1712), Daniel Marot, architect (1752), Countess Anna Isabella of Nassau-LaLecq (1765), Count Unico Wilhelm van Wassenaer, diplomat and composer (1766), and Hieronymus van Alphen, poet (1803).

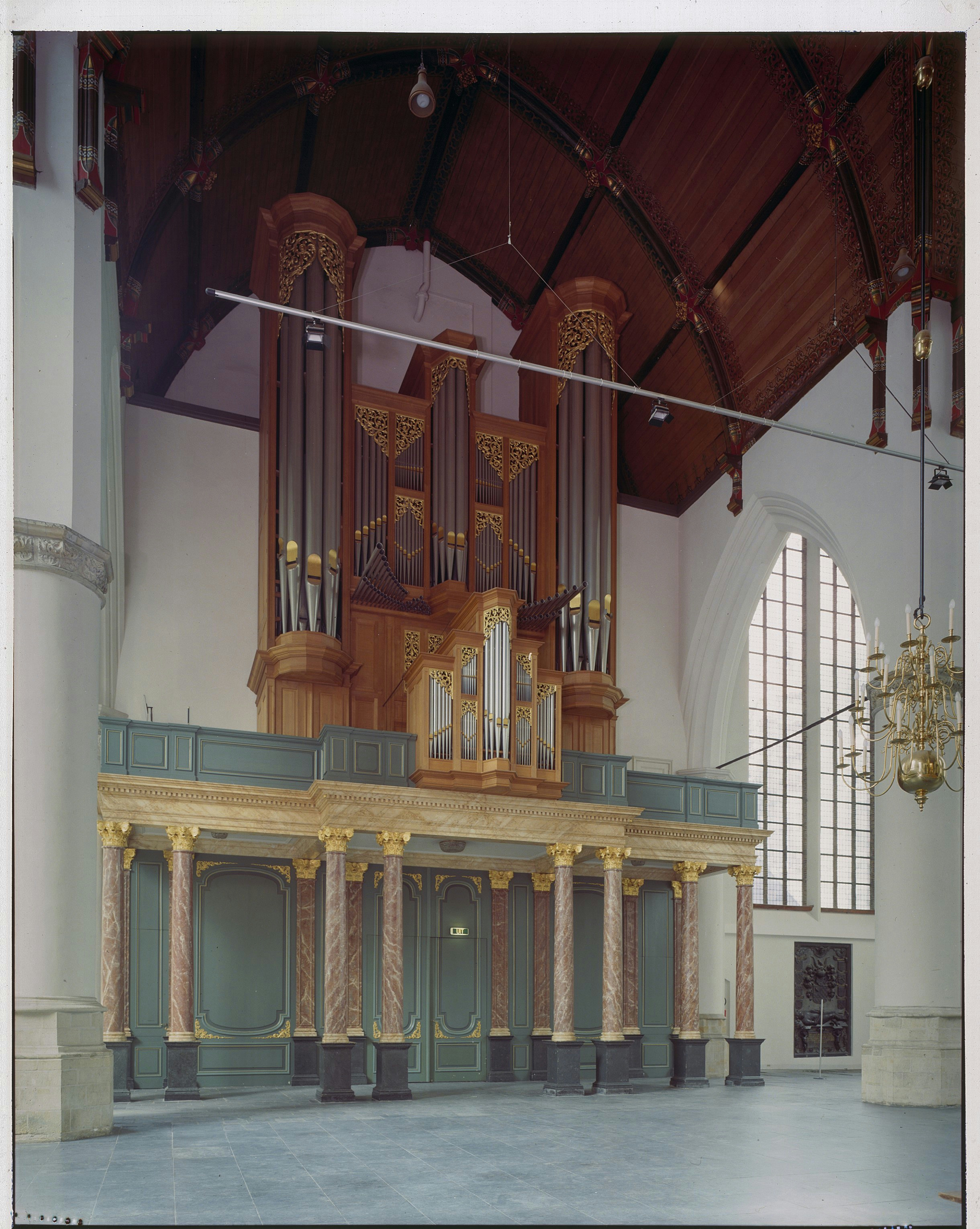
Main entrance with the organ by Metzler Orgelbau

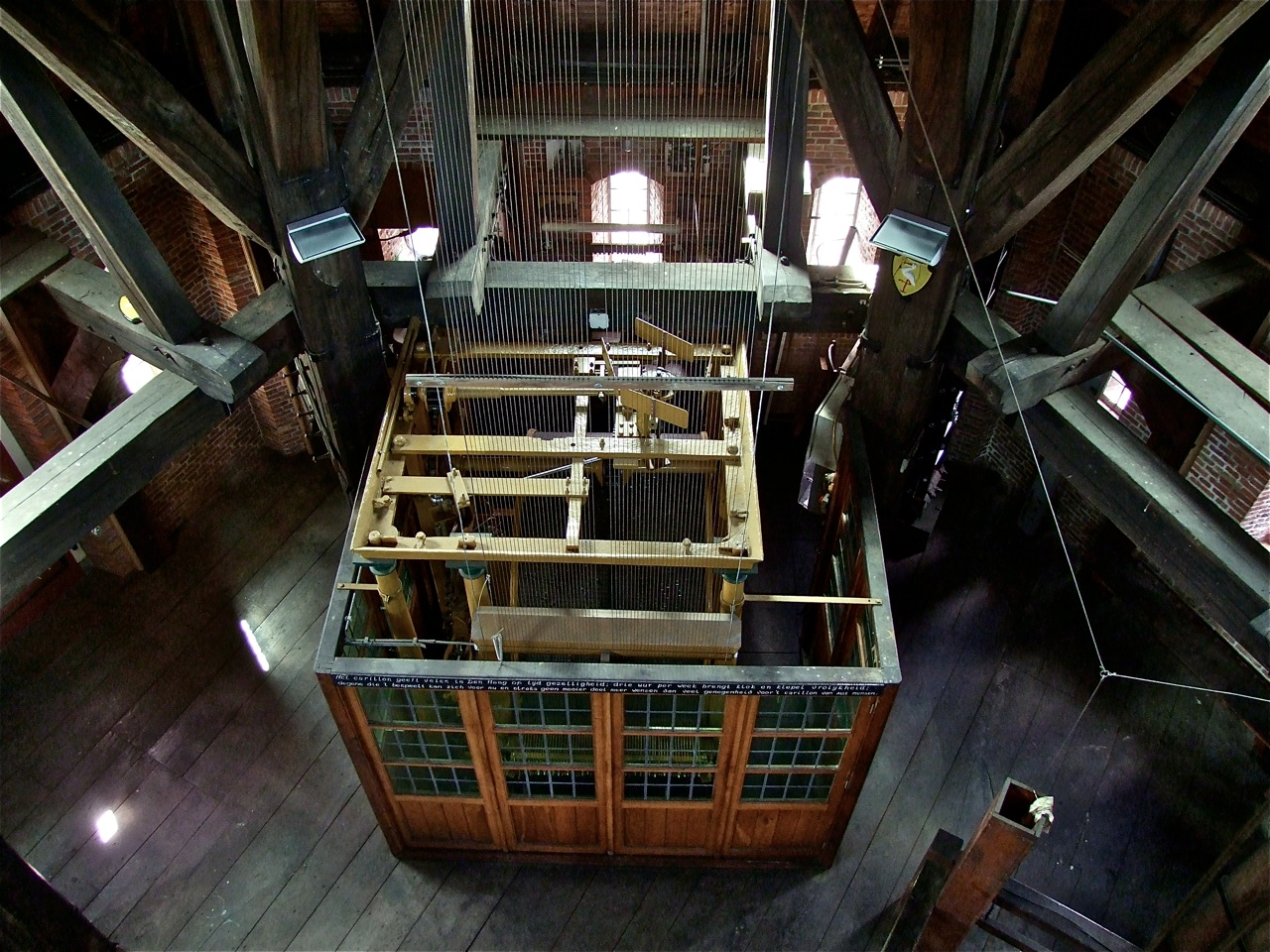
Carillon

Carillon music

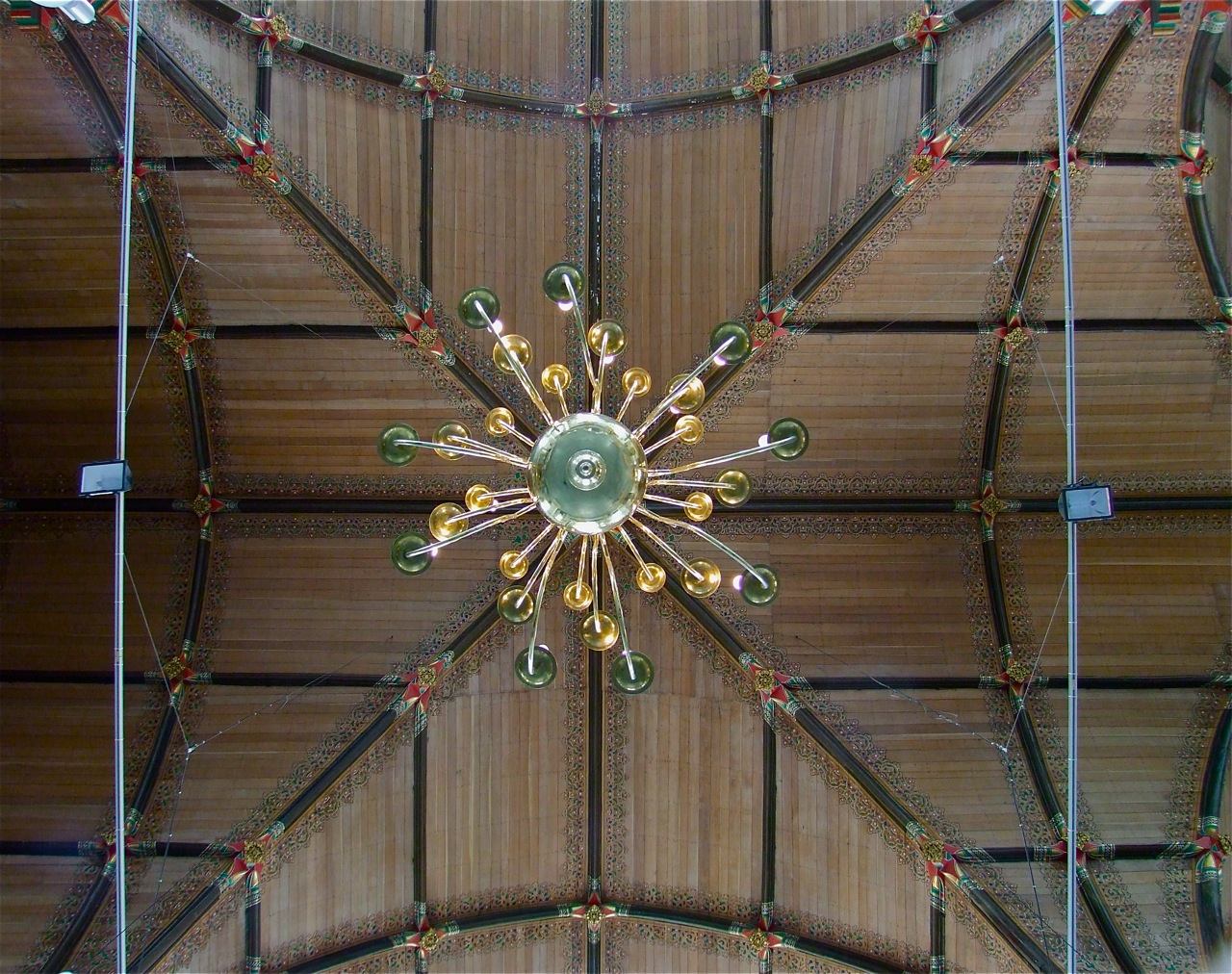
Painted wooden ceiling and bottom of chandelier

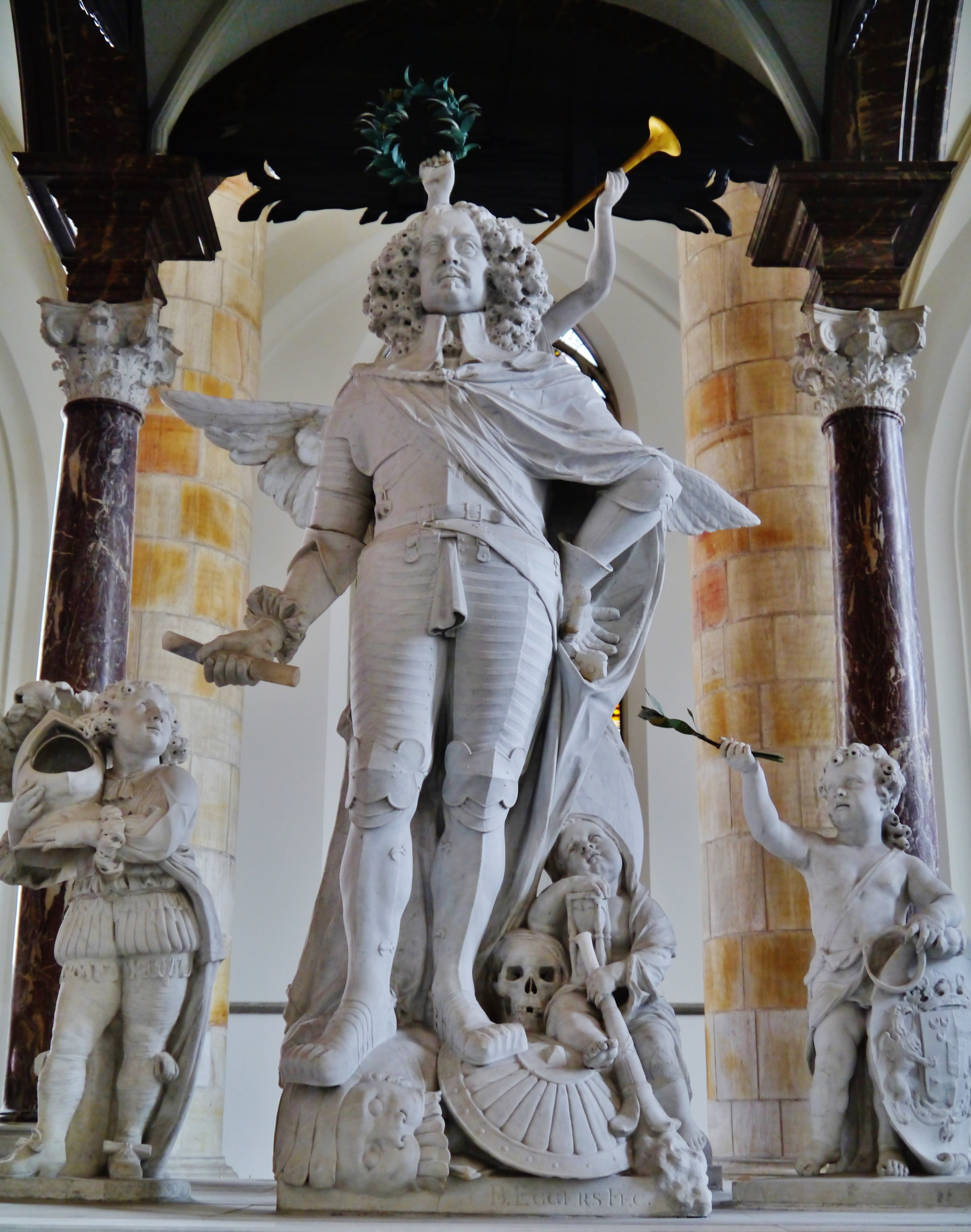
Monument for Jacob van Wassenaer Obdam by Bartholomeus Eggers

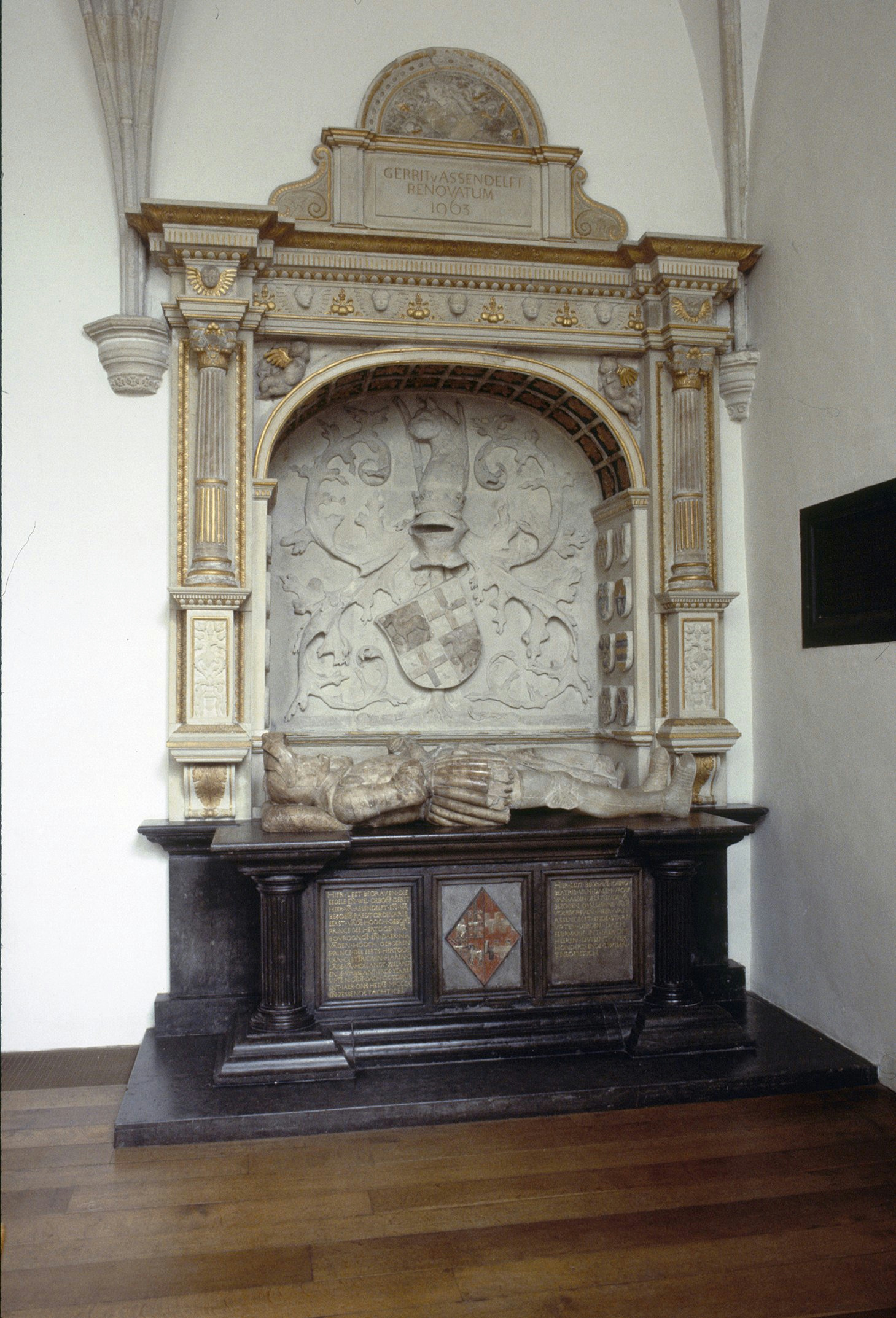
Tomb of Gerrit van Assendelft

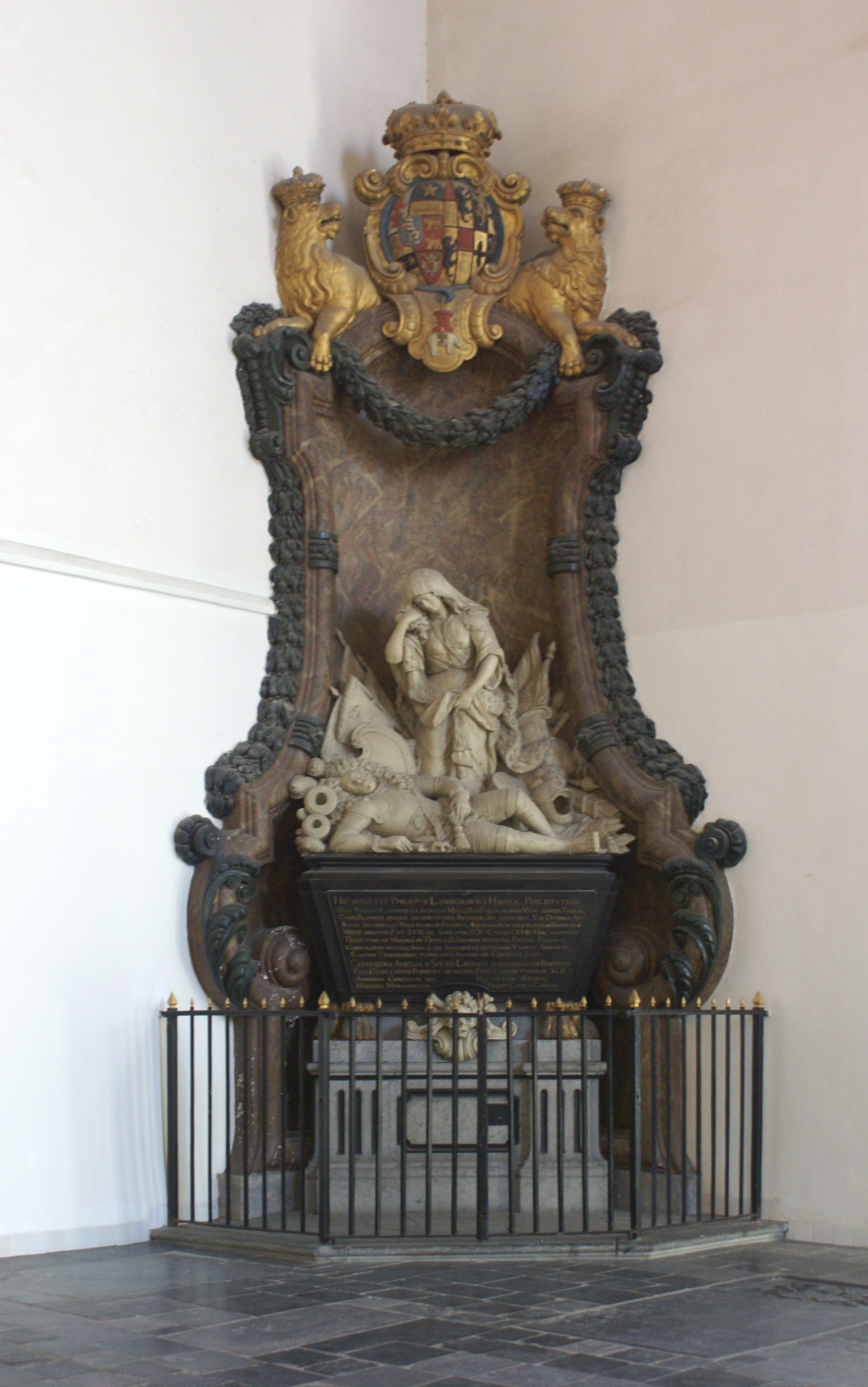
Tomb of Philip of Hesse-Philippsthal

== Church function ==
The church is formally owned by the City of The Hague and is managed by the "Stichting Grote Kerk Den Haag", which conducts restoration activities and rents it for concerts, but also facilitates various cultural initiatives of the city.

== See also ==
- List of tallest structures built before the 20th century
