= Leek, Netherlands =

Leek De Laik (Gronings)
- Town and former municipality
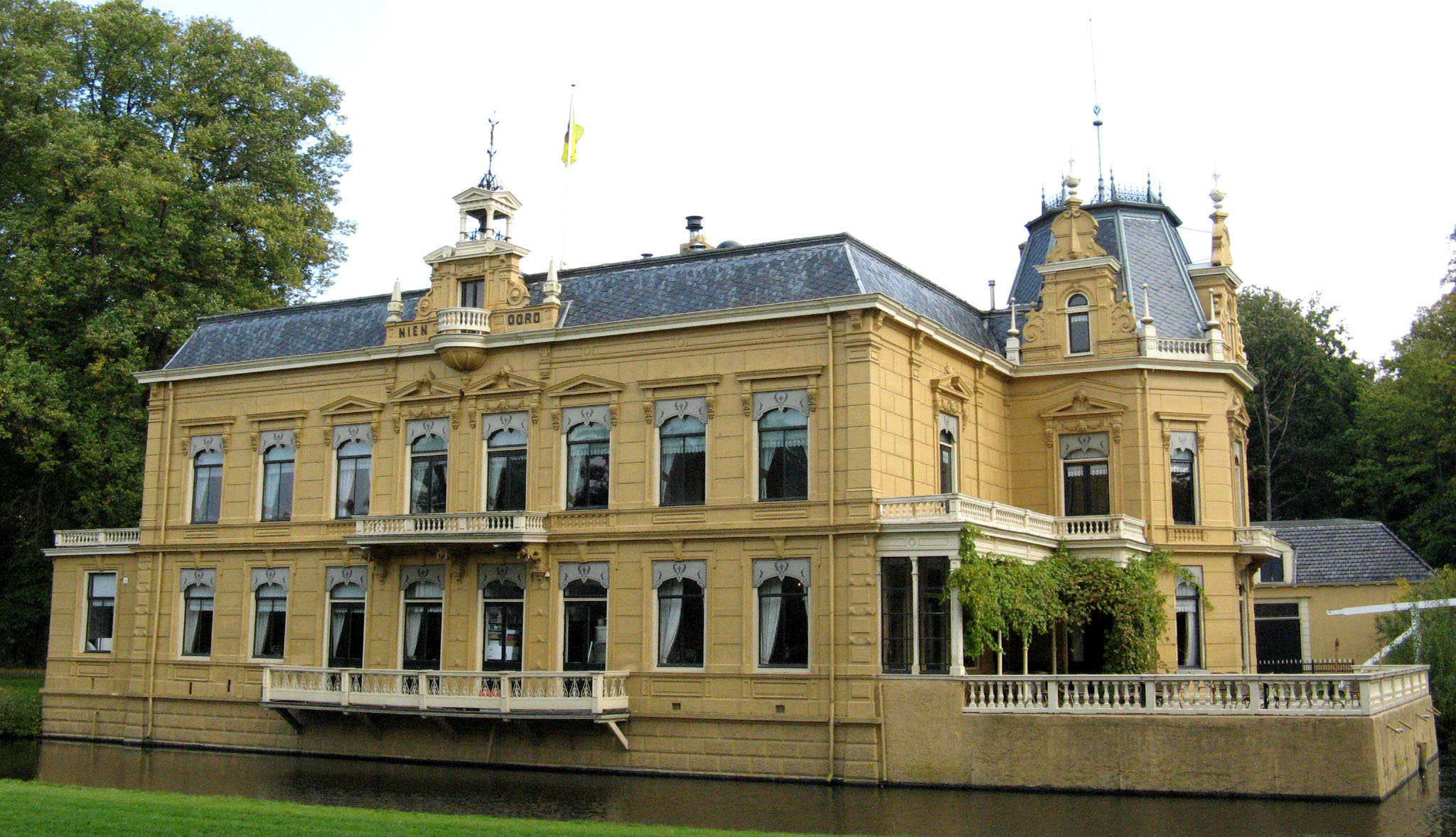
- Nienoord castle

- Flag Coat of arms

- Location in Groningen

- Location in the province of Groningen in the Netherlands Leek (Netherlands)
- Coordinates: 53°10′N 6°23′E
- Country: Netherlands
- Province: Groningen
- Municipality: Westerkwartier
- Merged: 2019

Area
  - Total: 6.17 km^{2} (2.38 sq mi)
- Elevation: 2 m (6.6 ft)

Population (2021)
  - Total: 11,175
  - Density: 1,810/km^{2} (4,690/sq mi)
- Demonym: Leekster
- Time zone: UTC+1 (CET)
  - Summer (DST): UTC+2 (CEST)
- Postcode: 9350–9351
- Area code: 0594

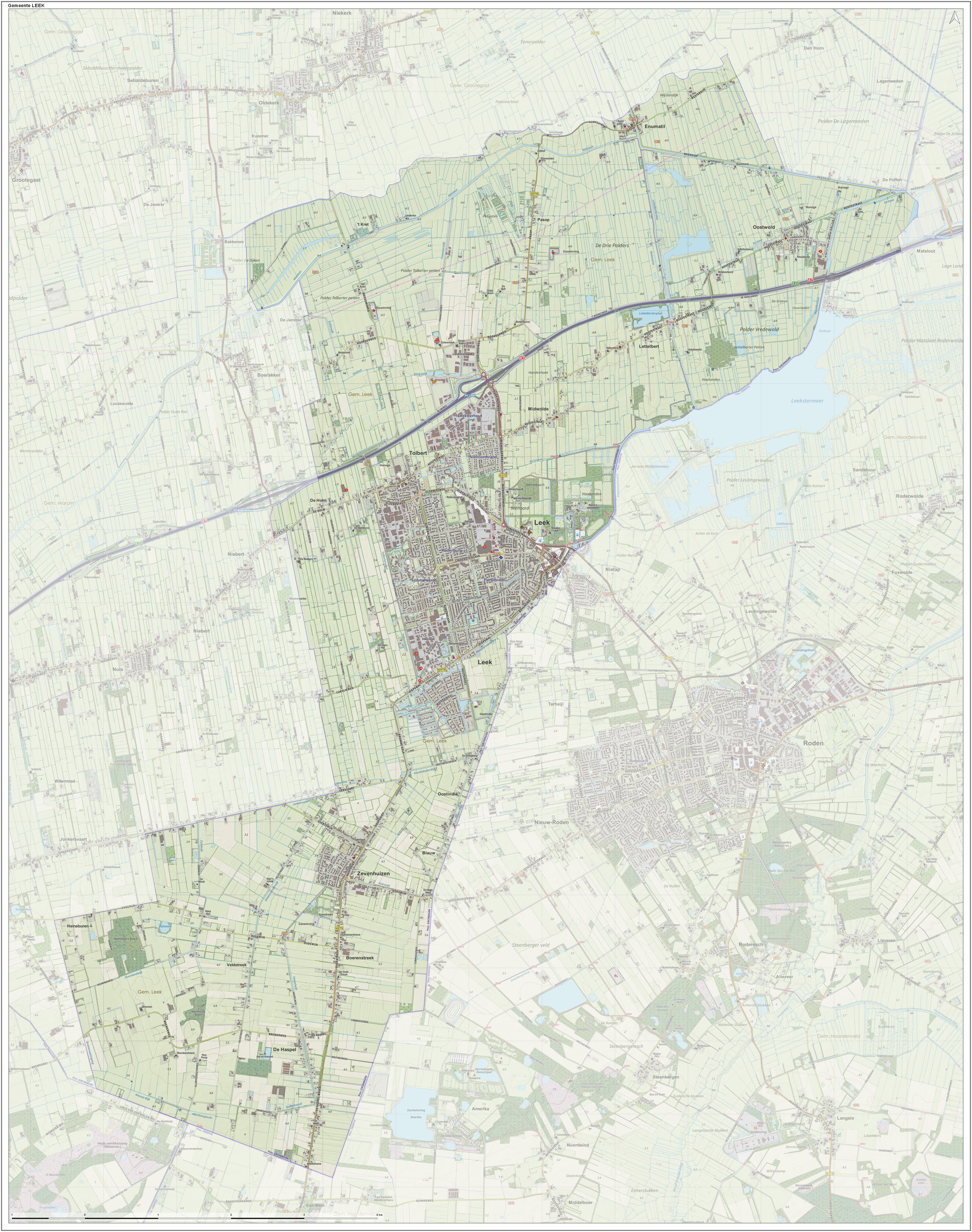
Duch topographic map of the municipality of Leek, Groningen, as per June 2015

Leek (Dutch: [leːk]; Gronings: De Laik; West Frisian: De Like) is a village and former municipality in Groningen province in the northeastern Netherlands. The municipality, which bordered the Drenthe and Friesland provinces, was merged into the municipality of Westerkwartier on 1 January 2019.

The village of Leek is approximately 20 km west of Groningen (city) on the A7 (E22) highway.

The village grew around a fortification that was constructed during the Eighty Years' War with Spain. The name 'Leek' was derived from a brook, the "Leke". The town is sometimes also called "De Leek". In Dutch, the people from Leek are called "Leeksters".

Every year around Pentecost there is a fair (Pinkstermarkt), drawing thousands of people from the area.

Near the village is a shallow lake, the Leekstermeer (also known as Zulthermeer), with recreational facilities, but the lake is in another municipality and in another province.

== Attractions in Leek ==
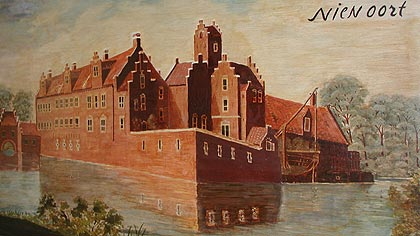
Nienoord before its destruction in 1850

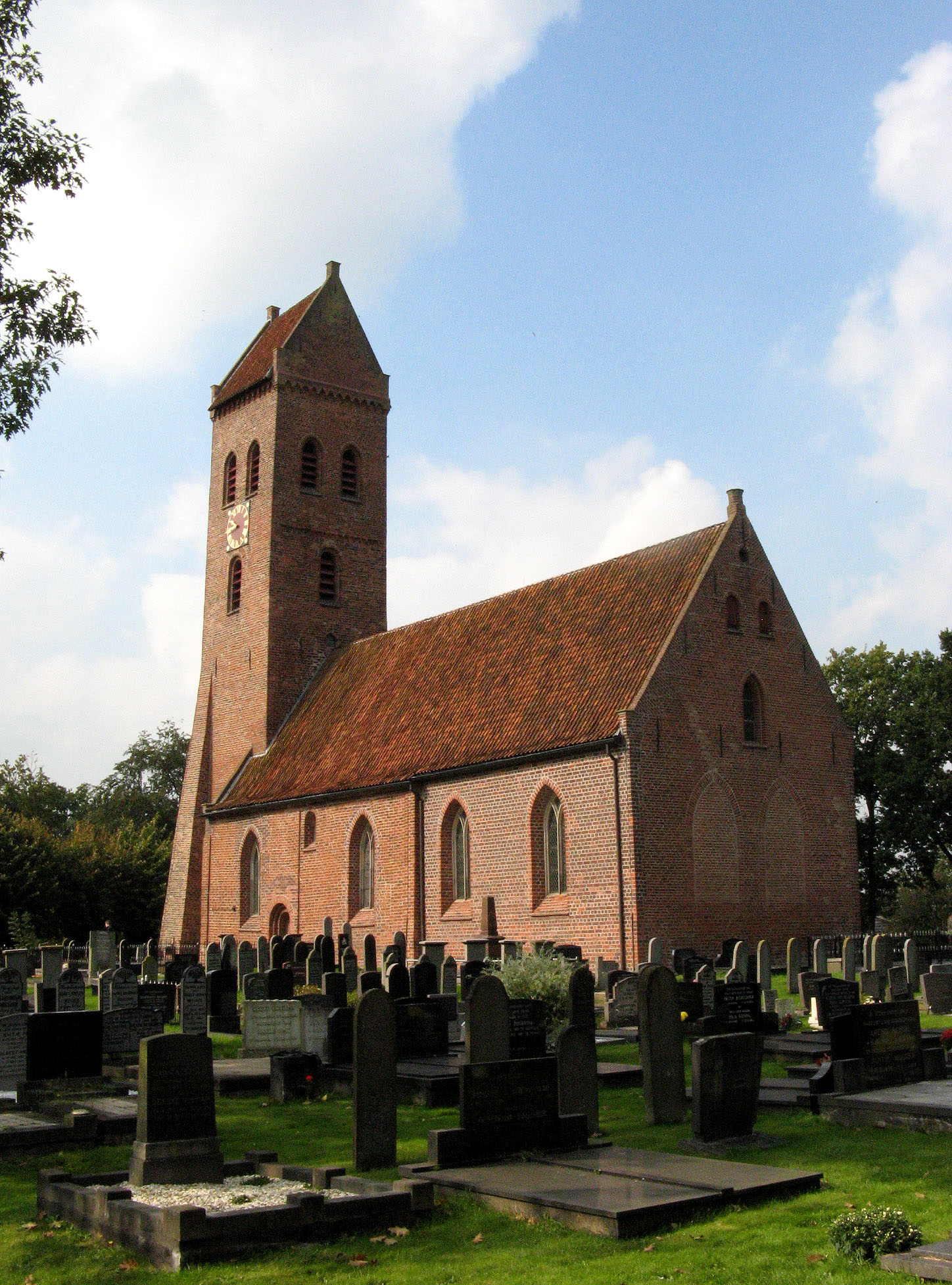
Church of Midwolde

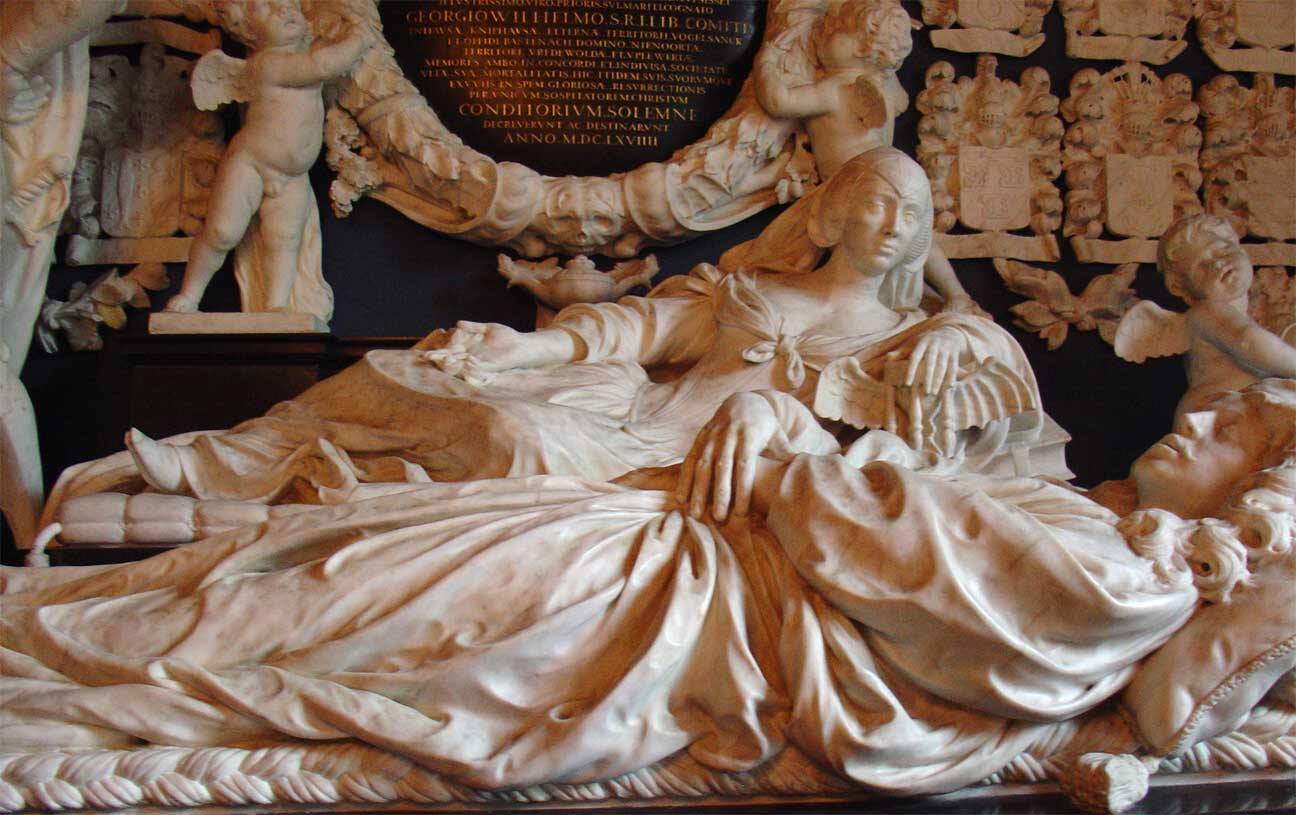
Tomb monument of Anna van Ewsum and Carel Hieronymus von In- und Knyphausen, in the church of Midwolde

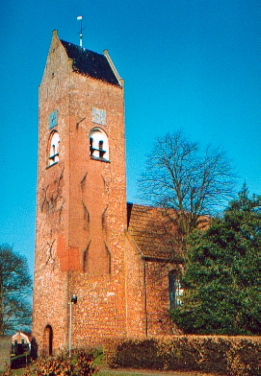
Church of Tolbert

The main attraction in the village is the "Nienoord" estate. The estate was founded in 1508. After a destroying fire, a new manor-house was built in 1887. The gardens and the shell grotto were restored.

The National Carriage Museum is located in this manor-house. In 1958 the National Carriage Museum rented the house and gardens. The National Carriage Museum presents an overall view of the various types of carriages and sleighs from the 18th to the 20th century. The 250 coaches in the museum's collection were used by farmers, the common man, noblemen and royalty.

In the estate is situated a recreation park (Family-park Nienoord) with model railways in several scales, including live steam.

In Tolbert and Midwolde are churches from the 12th century. The churches are built in the Romano-Gothic style. Typical for this style are the walls and gables of brick that are richly decorated with recesses and patterns of bricks.

In the church of Midwolde is a tomb monument sculpted by Rombout Verhulst. Rombout Verhulst also decorated the tomb of Michiel de Ruyter in the Nieuwe Kerk in Amsterdam.

== Population centres ==
Enumatil, Leek, Lettelbert, Midwolde, Oostwold, Tolbert and Zevenhuizen.
