= Tolbert, Netherlands =

Tolbert
- Town
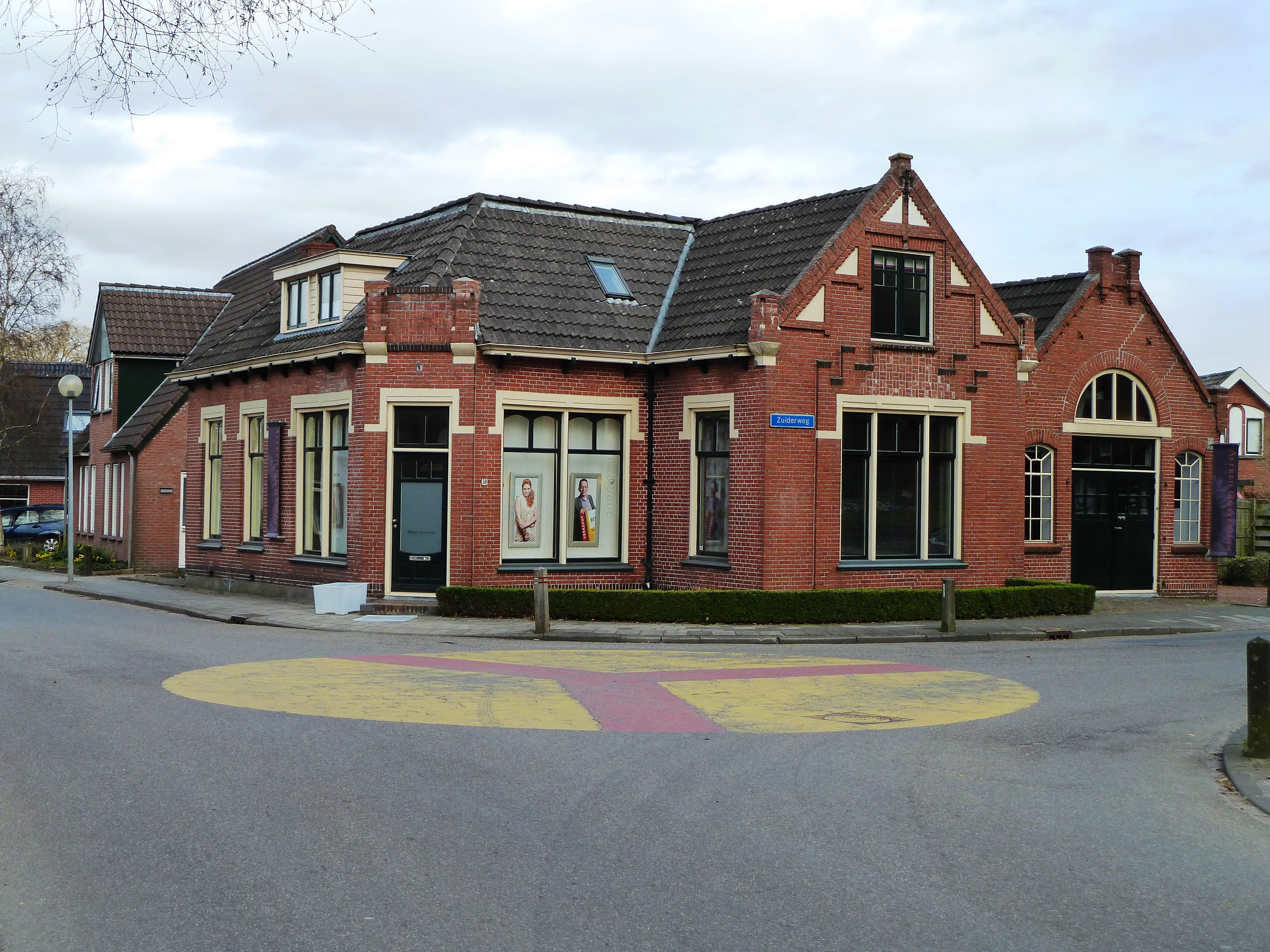
- Former smithy in Tolbert

- Location in province of Groningen in the Netherlands Tolbert (Netherlands)
- Coordinates: 53.1703°N 6.3624°E
- Country: Netherlands
- Province: Groningen
- Municipality: Westerkwartier

Area
  - Total: 12.74 km^{2} (4.92 sq mi)
- Elevation: 4 m (13 ft)

Population (2021)
  - Total: 4,475
  - Density: 351.3/km^{2} (909.7/sq mi)
- Time zone: UTC+1 (CET)
  - Summer (DST): UTC+2 (CEST)
- Postal code: 9356
- Dialing code: 0594

Tolbert is a town in the Dutch province of Groningen. It is part of the municipality of Westerkwartier and forms a single urban area with Leek.

== History ==
Tolbert is located in the Vredewold region. The area was settled during the 10th and 11th century. It was first mentioned in 1479 as Oldebert. The name is a contraction of het (the definite article) ol(de) (old) and bert (borough, village), and literally means "the old village". The church is from the 17th century, but contains 13th century parts. The parish dates from the 14th century. In 1794, Tolbert bought a seat in the States of Groningen from Aduard, and in 1795 was the seat of a municipality with Midwolde, Lettelbert and Oostwold. In 1795, it was home to 476 people. By 1817, it was part of the municipality of Leek.

Tolbert was mainly an agricultural community, however the industrialisation of nearby Leek attracted people to the village. In 1907, there was a malaria outbreak in Tolbert. After World War II, Tolbert and Leek became a single urban area, however it remained a separate entity. In 2019, it became part of the municipality of Westerkwartier.

== Sports ==
In 1950, a street circuit for motorcycle racing was set-up in the village. In 1956, it was considered too dangerous and was no longer permitted. In 1970, permission was granted outside the build-up area. In 1984, Jack Middelburg was killed during a race. In 2008, the races ended, because the organisation could not finance the required safety investments.

== Gallery ==
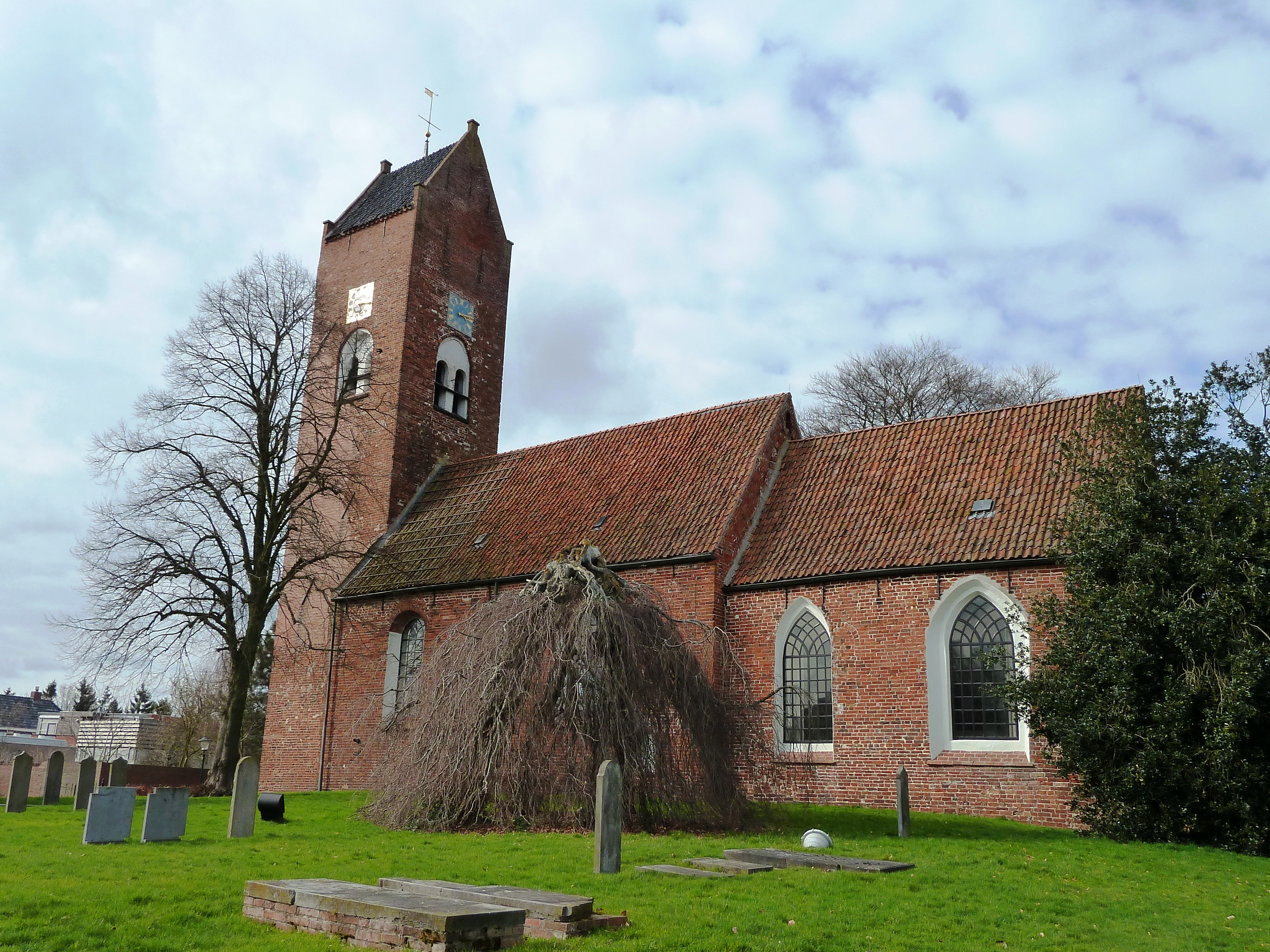
Church

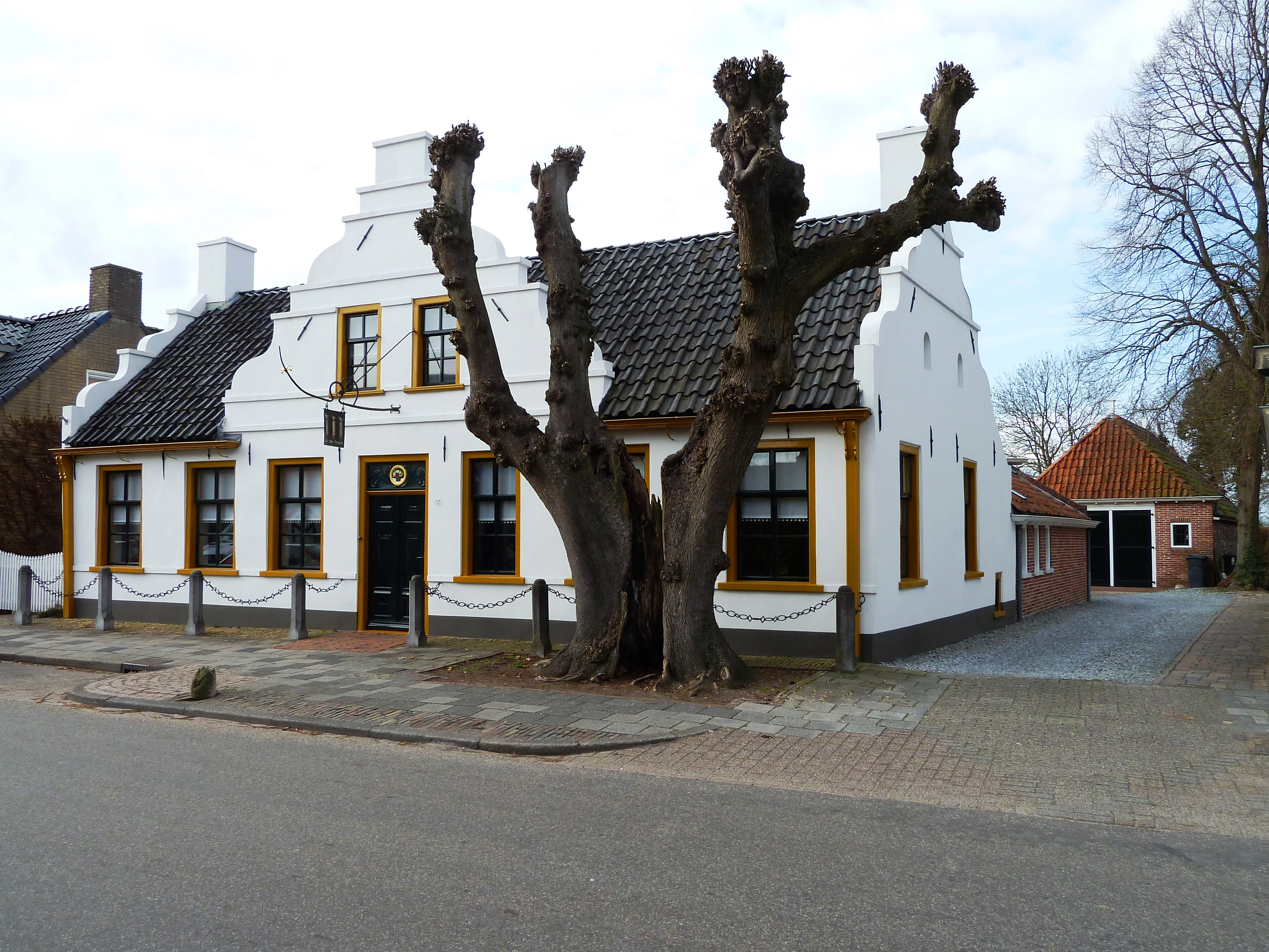
Pub "De Akker"

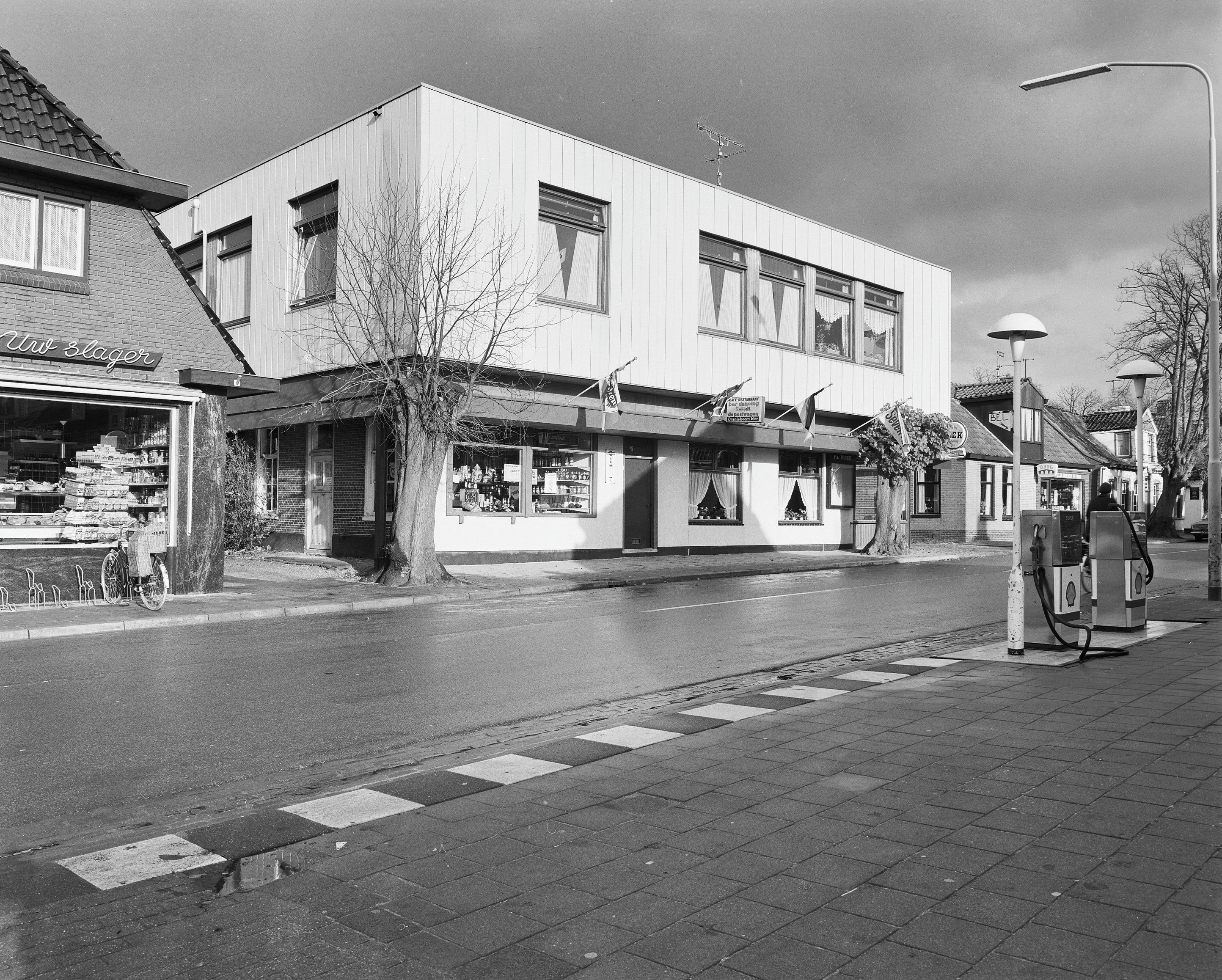
Village centre (1975)

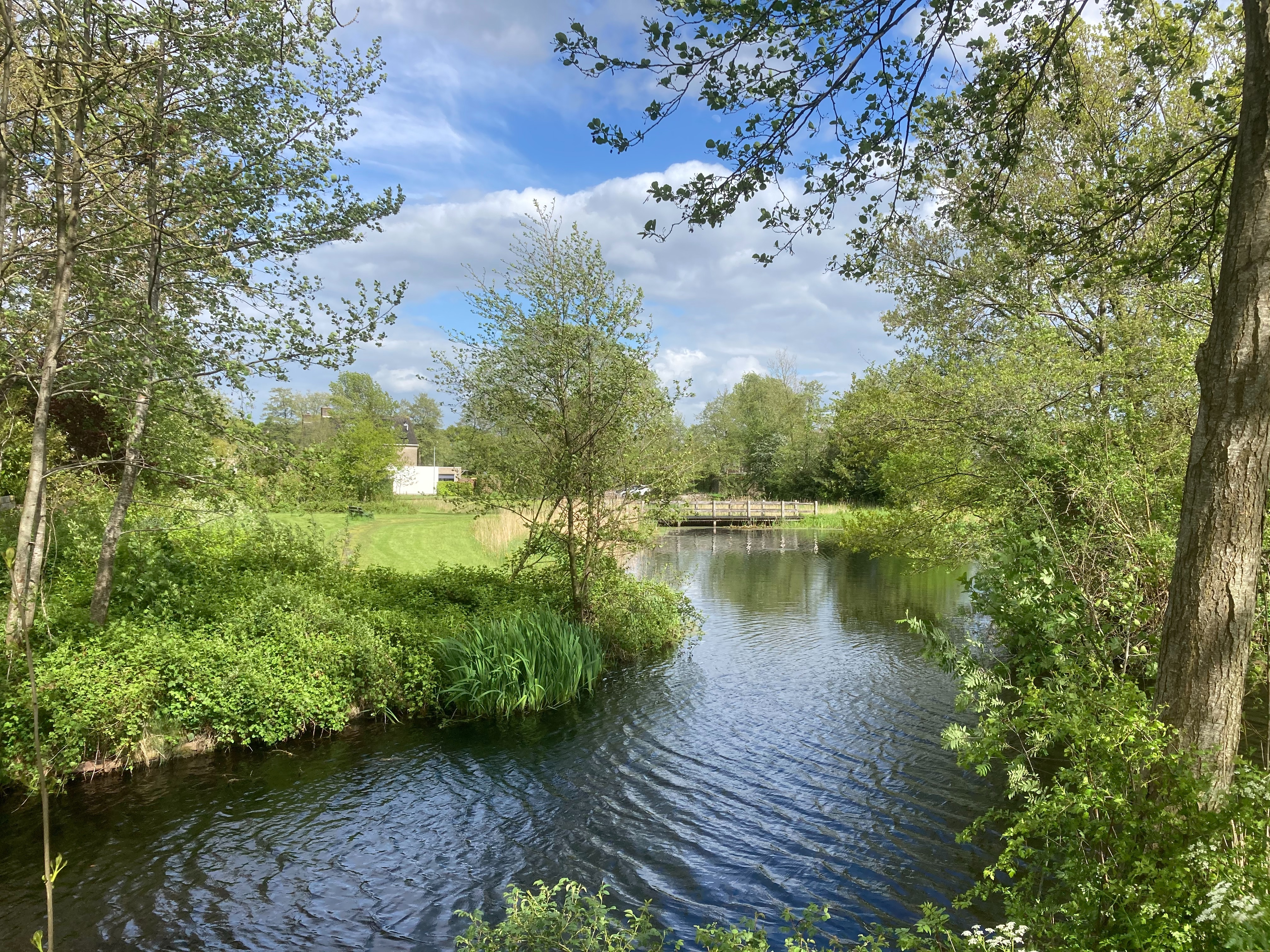
View along the main canal
