= Tolbert =

Tolbert is a surname. Notable people with the surname include:

- Berlinda Tolbert (born 1949), American film and television actress, The Jeffersons
- Caroline Tolbert, American political scientist
- Emanuel Tolbert (born 1958), American football player
- Frank Tolbert (disambiguation), multiple people
- Jalen Tolbert (born 1999), American football player
- Jim Tolbert (born 1944), American football player
- John Tolbert, American local education activist
- Kim Tolbert, Dallas city manager
- Lynda Tolbert-Goode (born 1967), American hurdler and sprinter
- Margaret Tolbert (born 1943), American chemist
- Matt Tolbert (born 1982), American baseball player
- Mike Tolbert (born 1985), American football player
- Miles Tolbert, Secretary of the Environment of the State of Oklahoma
- Paden Tolbert (1870–1904), American law enforcement officer and railroad agent
- Ray Tolbert (born 1958), American basketball player
- Sara Tolbert, American professor of environmental education in New Zealand
- Skeets Tolbert (1909–2000), American jazz clarinetist, saxophonist, and band leader
- Stacey Lovelace-Tolbert (born 1974), American basketball player
- Stephen A. Tolbert (1921–1975), Liberian politician and businessman
- Tom Tolbert (born 1965), American basketball player and sports broadcaster
- Tony Tolbert (born 1967), American football player
- Tyke Tolbert (contemporary), American football player and coach
- Tyler Tolbert (born 1998), American baseball player
- Victoria Tolbert (1916–1997), First Lady of Liberia
- William Tolbert (1913–1980), President of Liberia 1971–80

Given name

- Tolbert Lanston, American founder of Monotype
- Tolbert McCoy, victim in the Hatfield-McCoy feud

== See also ==
- Tolbert, Netherlands, a town in the Netherlands
