= Leekstermeer =

Lake in the Netherlands

- Zulthermeer
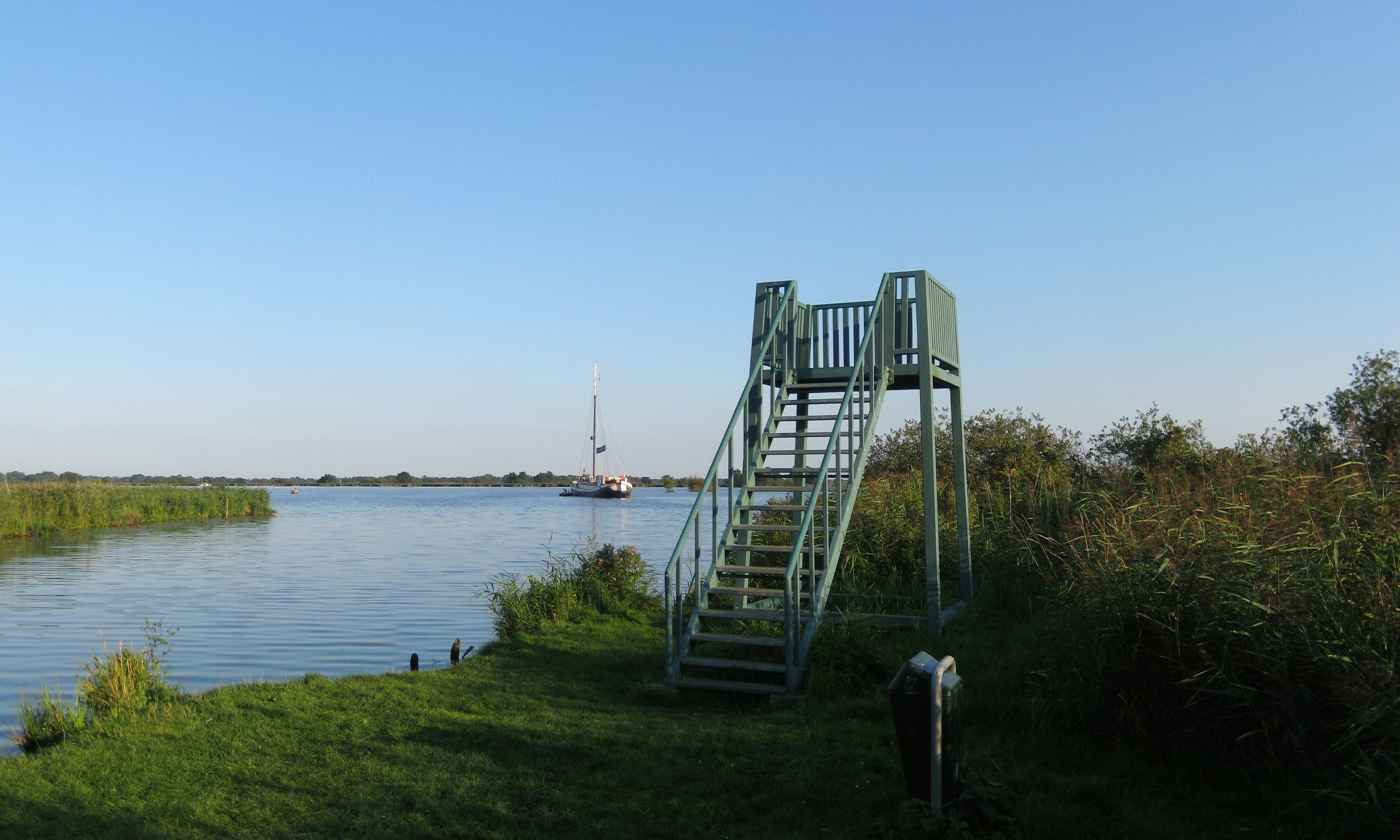
- Observation tower near the Leekstermeer

- Location within Drenthe
- Location: Noordenveld, Drenthe, Netherlands
- Coordinates: 53°10′48″N 6°26′5″E
- Primary inflows: Leekster Hoofddiep; Leutingerwolderpolder; Rodervaart; Roderwolder Matsloot
- Primary outflows: Gave; Lettelberterdiep; Munnikesloot
- Basin countries: Netherlands
- Surface area: 3.35 km^{2} (1.29 sq mi)
- Average depth: 1.25 m (4.1 ft)
- Max. depth: 2.20 m (7.2 ft)

Ramsar Wetland
- Official name: Leekstermeergebied
- Designated: 29 August 2000
- Reference no.: 1248

The Leekstermeer (transl. 'Lake of Leek'; also known as Zulthermeer) is a lake in the Netherlands. It is the biggest lake of the province of Drenthe. The lake and its surrounding area, the Leekstermeergebied has been a designated Ramsar Wetland since 2000.

== Geography ==
The Leekstermeer is located in the municipality of Noordenveld along the border of the provinces of Drenthe and Groningen. Before the municipal reorganization of 1990, the provincial border ran through the north of the lake, after which it was located on the northern bank. The lake is named after the nearby Groninger village of Leek.

The western side, where most water recreation takes place, has a swampy peat bottom. The eastern half of the lake has a harder sand bottom and is therefore more suitable for windsurfing. The northeastern part of the lake is also known as Rietboor. The lake covers 335 hectares and is between 1 and 1.5 meters deep, with local peaks of approximately 2.20 meters.

The Leekster Hoofddiep, the Leutingerwolderpolder, the Rodervaart and the Roderwolder Matsloot flow into the lake. The water leaves the lake via the Lettelberterdiep on the north side and the Munnikesloot (or Munnikevaart) and the Gave on the northeast side. The Lettelberterdiep and the Gave both flow into the Hoendiep.

== History ==
The origin of the lake is not exactly known, but it probably originated only after 1000 AD, probably as a result of ground level subsidence due to drainage of peat, perhaps in combination with increasing water loads from the environment and difficulties with drainage via the North Groningen zijlen.

The lake is also called the Zulthermeer or Zulthe, named after the geographical region between Nietap and Roden. The name Zulthe is sometimes explained as meaning 'salt lake', because it was in open connection with the sea until the 16th century. However, the distance is too great for this to have had an influence. Especially because there were some so-called zijlen (locks) between the lake and the sea in the past, namely the Niezijl and the Aduarderzijl.

== Fauna ==
Several animal species that are threatened in the Netherlands that live in and around the lake include the corn crake, the spotted crake, the Eurasian water shrew, Desmoulin's whorl snail, and the green hawker.

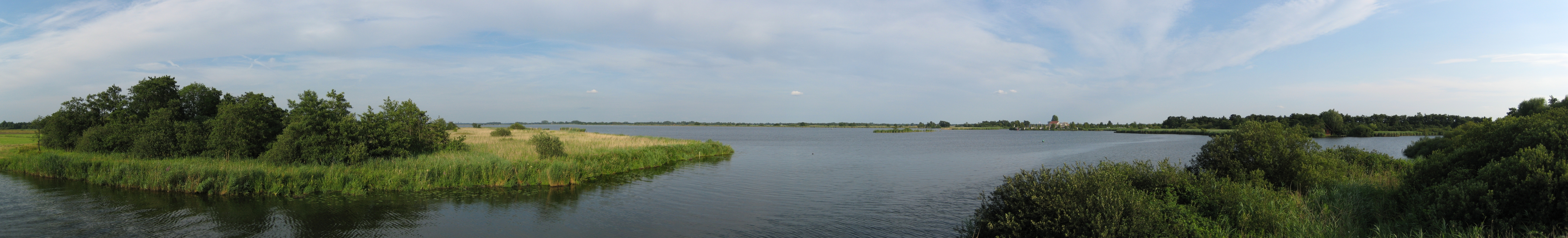
Panorama of the Leekstermeer
