= Lettelbert =

Lettelbert Lepterd (Gronings)
- Village
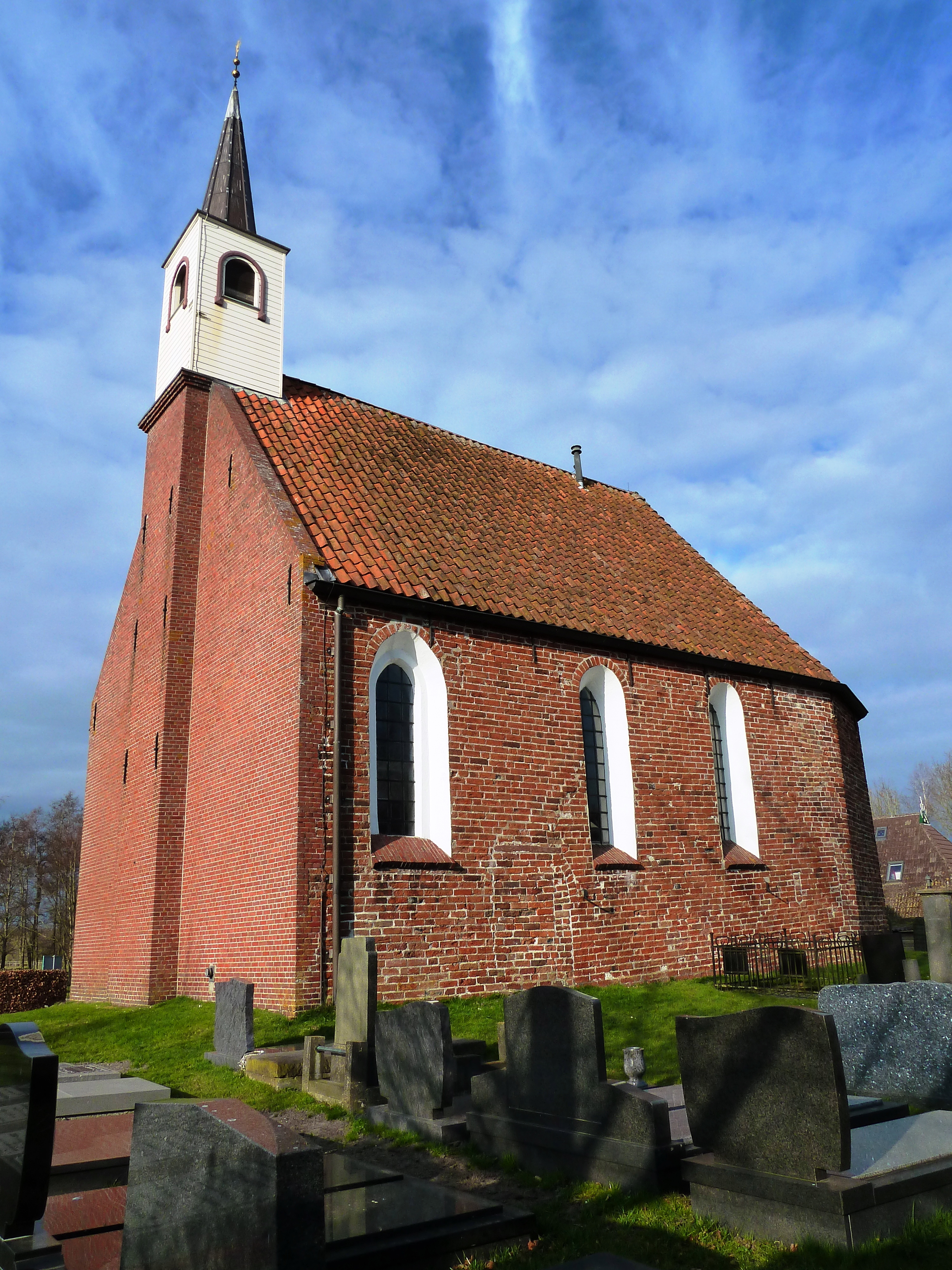
- Church of Lettelbert

- Location in the province of Groningen in the Netherlands Lettelbert (Netherlands)
- Coordinates: 53°11′N 6°24′E
- Country: Netherlands
- Province: Groningen
- Municipality: Westerkwartier
- Elevation: 0.9 m (3.0 ft)

Population (2021)
  - Total: 150
- Time zone: UTC+1 (CET)
  - Summer (DST): UTC+2 (CEST)
- Postcode: 9827
- Area code: 0594

Lettelbert (Dutch pronunciation: [ˈlɛtəlˌbɛrt]; Gronings: Lepterd) is a village in the municipality of Westerkwartier in the province of Groningen in the Netherlands. As of 2021, it had a population of 150. Agriculture and livestock are the main sources of income.

Lettelbert means 'small neighborhood' (kleine buurt), near Lettelbert are also 'old neighborhood' (oude buurt) and 'new neighborhood' (nieuwe buurt), namely the villages of Tolbert and Niebert. The village arose in the Middle Ages on a sand ridge in the Westerkwartier near the Lettelberterdiep.

The Reformed church of Lettelbert is owned by the Stichting Oude Groninger Kerken. The single-aisled church was built in the thirteenth century and has a five-sided closed choir and a roof turret.

Lettelbert has a small marina on the Leekstermeer and a natural camping site. Near the village are the Lettelberterpetten, a peat area that was extracted between 1900 and 1920 and became overgrown with alder woods and has been a nature reserve of Het Groninger Landschap since 1961.

== Notable people ==
- Henk de Haan (born 1941), Dutch economist and politician

== Gallery ==
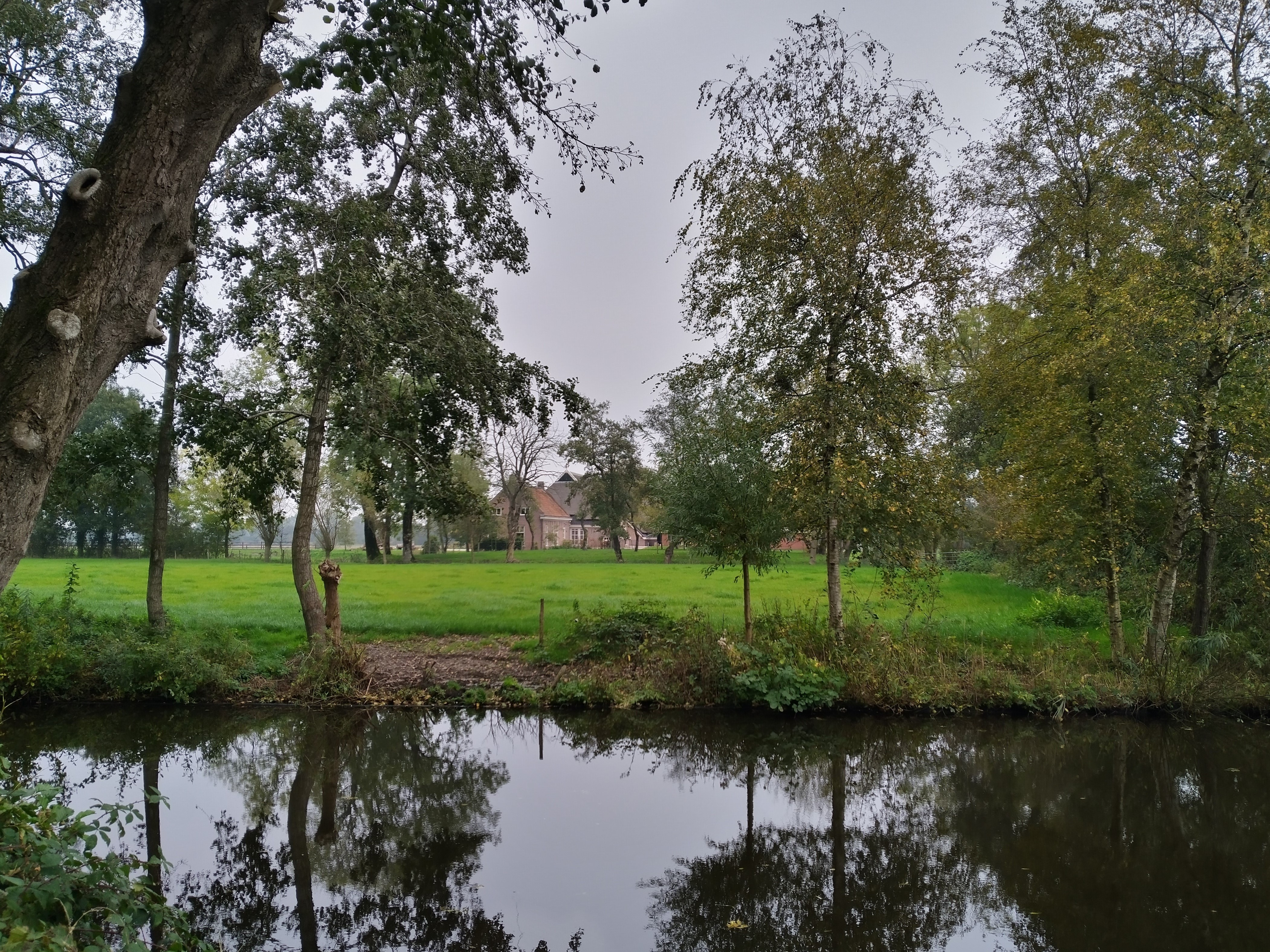
Farmhouse Vredenwold at the Lettelberterdiep

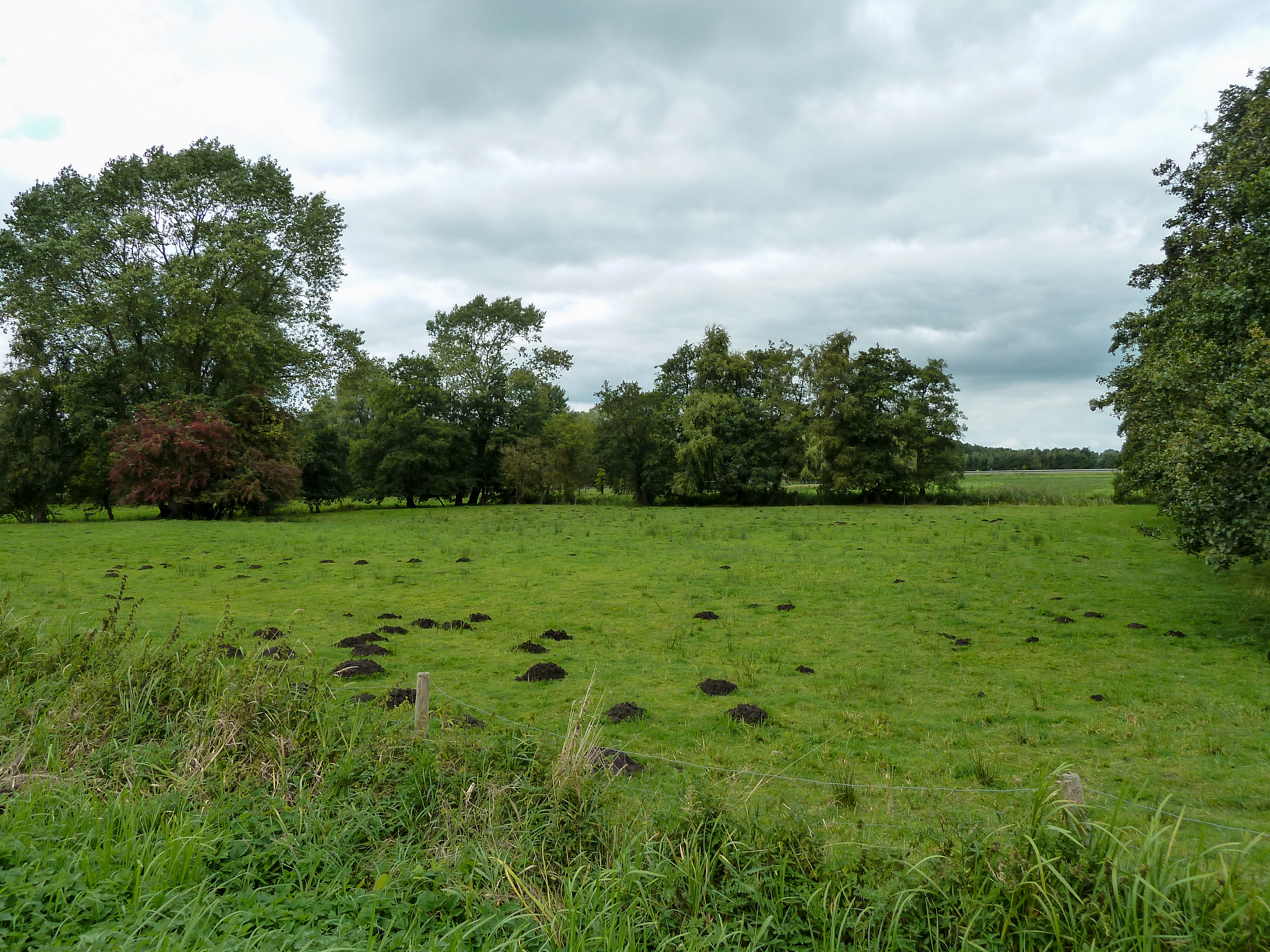
Typical bocage

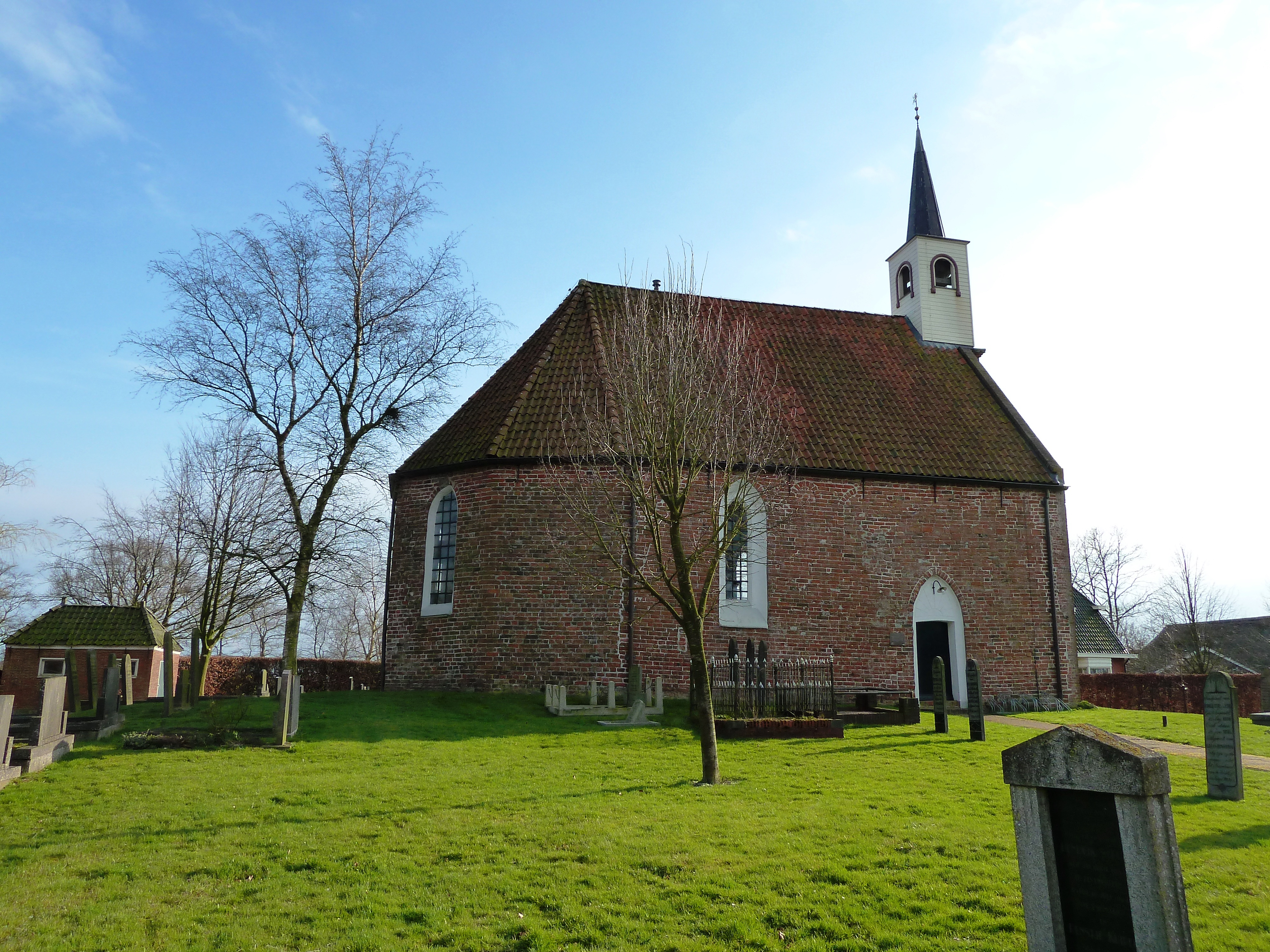
Church of Lettelbert from the south

== Bibliography ==
- Bousema, J.; Kemme, N. (2008). Lettelbert, een klein en gering dorp. Lettelbert: Stichting Dorpshuis Lettelbert. p. 343. ISBN 9789070573324.
