= Nietap =

- Village
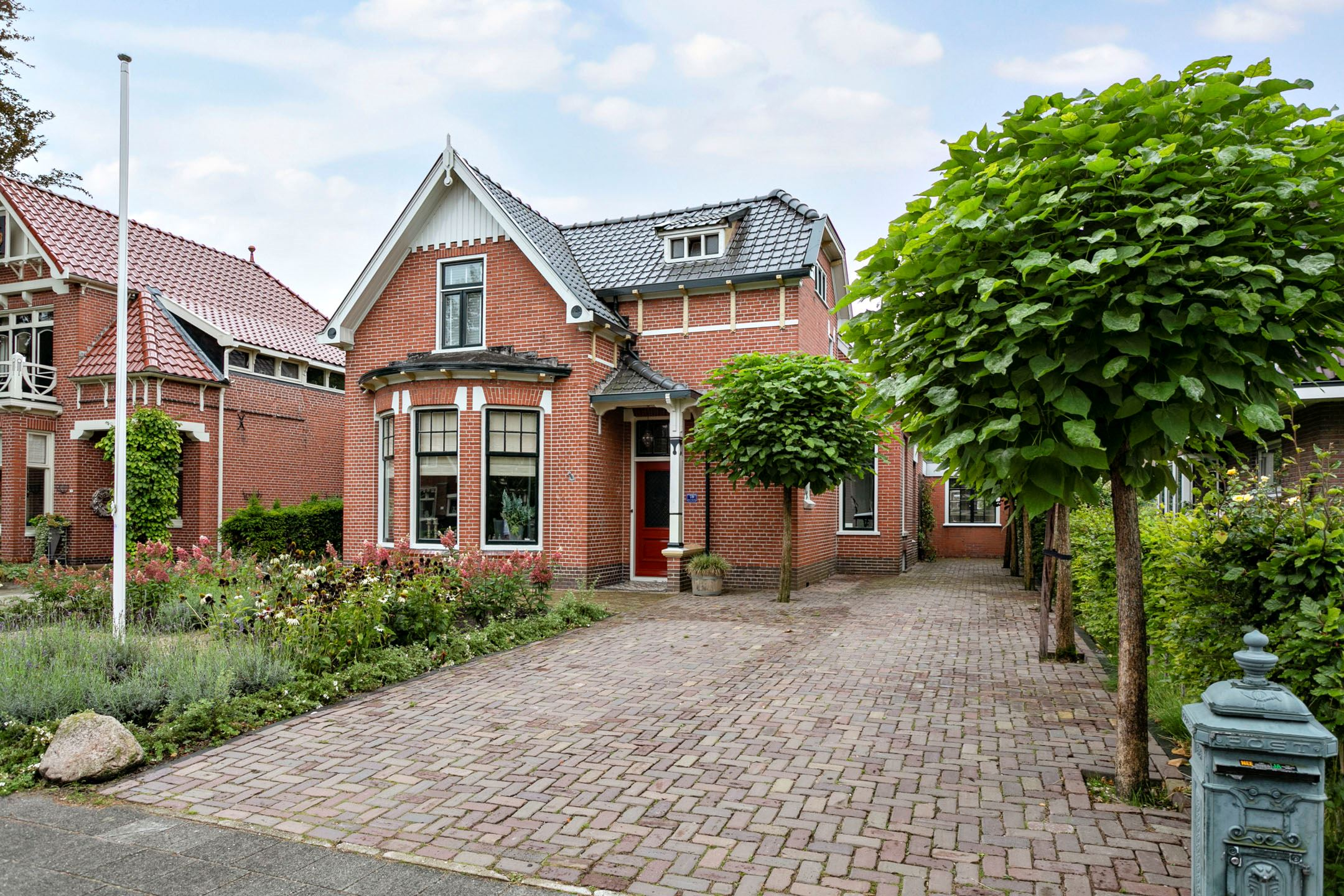
- House in Nietap

- Location in province of Drenthe in the Netherlands Nietap (Netherlands)
- Coordinates: 53°9′33″N 6°23′47″E
- Country: Netherlands
- Province: Drenthe
- Municipality: Noordenveld
- Established: 1693

Area
  - Total: 0.66 km^{2} (0.25 sq mi)
- Elevation: 0 m (0 ft)

Population (2021)
  - Total: 870
  - Density: 1,300/km^{2} (3,400/sq mi)
- Time zone: UTC+1 (CET)
  - Summer (DST): UTC+2 (CEST)
- Postal code: 9312
- Dialing code: 0594

Nietap is a village in the Netherlands and is part of the Noordenveld municipality in Drenthe.

== History ==
The borg (castle) Tedema was built near the current village. It was probably built by Johan Thedema, burgemeester of the city of Groningen around 1450 to excerpt control over the border area. The castle was demolished around 1730. In 1600, the settlement was first mentioned as "Jan Tedema ... thoe Roen" (Jan Tedema towards Roden). In 1685, it first appeared as "Nye Tap" meaning "New Inn". Nietap was located on the road towards Leek in Groningen. The village was officially founded in 1693.

The location near the border of Drenthe, Groningen and Friesland attracted retail to Nietap. The economy was also based on smuggling. It was home to 189 people in 1840. During the 20th century, it started to grow due to improved roads. A clothespin factory was established in Nietap which employed 500 people during the 1930s, but was later unable to compete with plastic clothespins. Nietap grew in to a single urban area with Leek. Nietap resisted plans to annex the village.

== Nature ==
Natuurschoon is a forest located between Nietap and Roden. In 1997, a dovecote was constructed in the pasture near the forest. Even though it was intended for pigeons, it is used by owls.

== Gallery ==
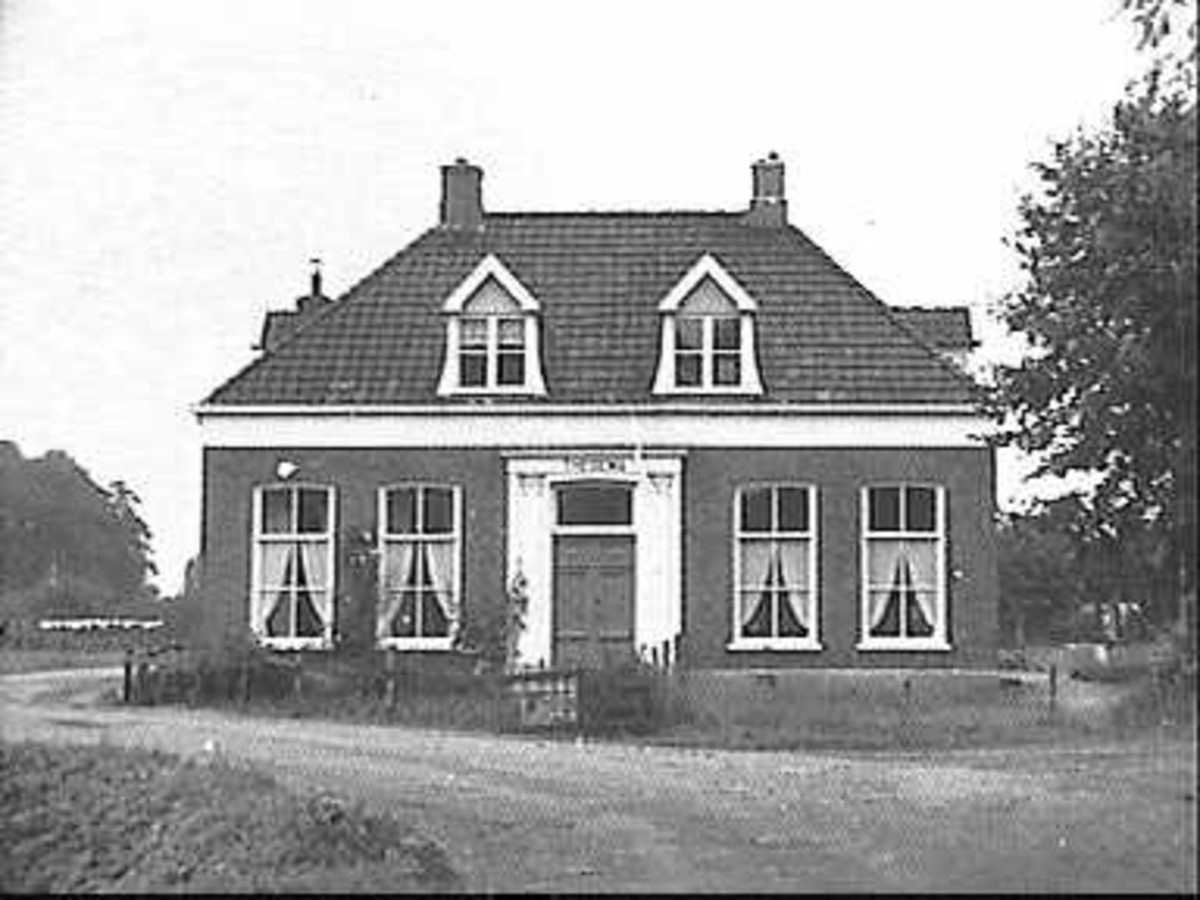
"Themeda" house (1961)

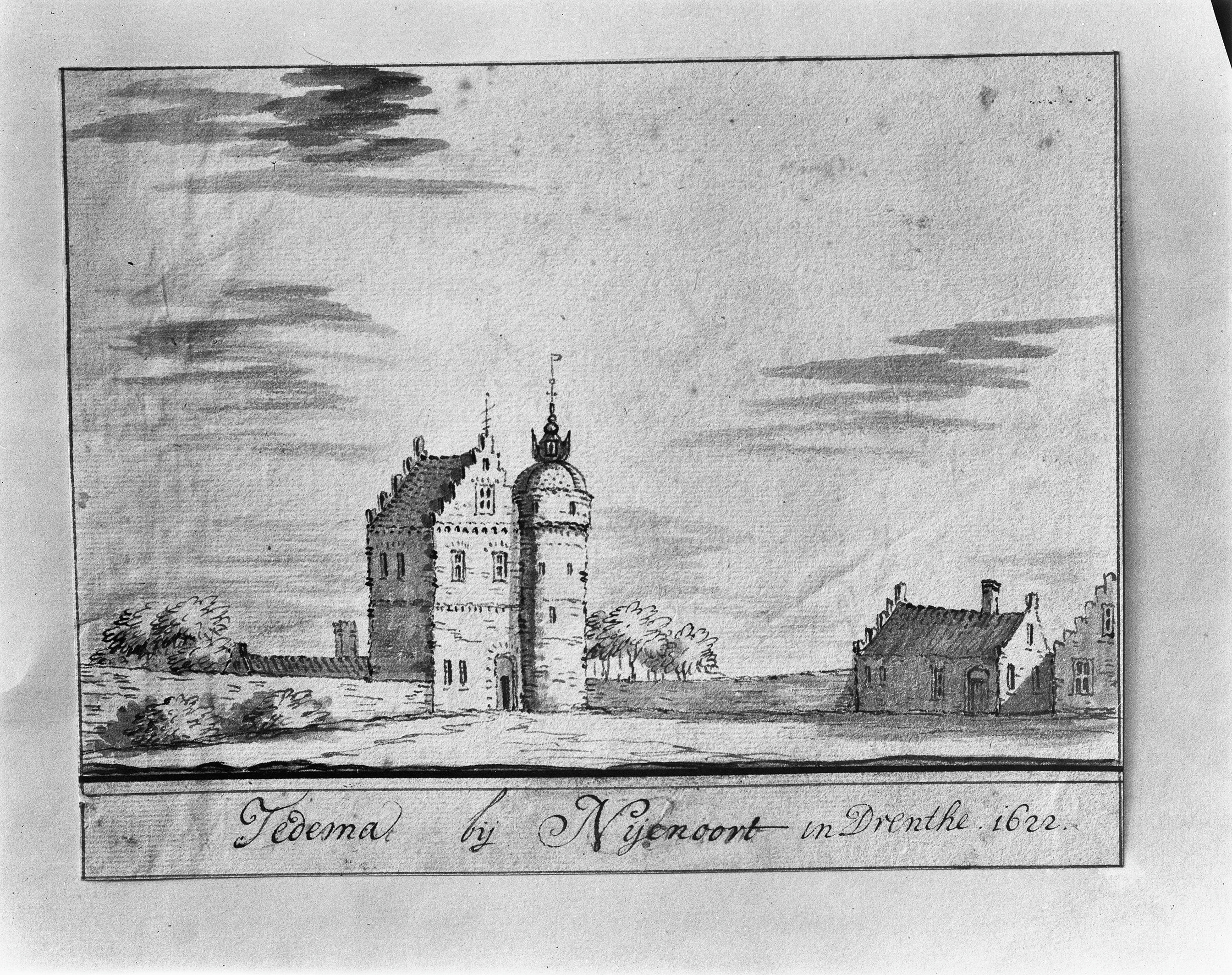
Drawing of Borg Tedema (1622)

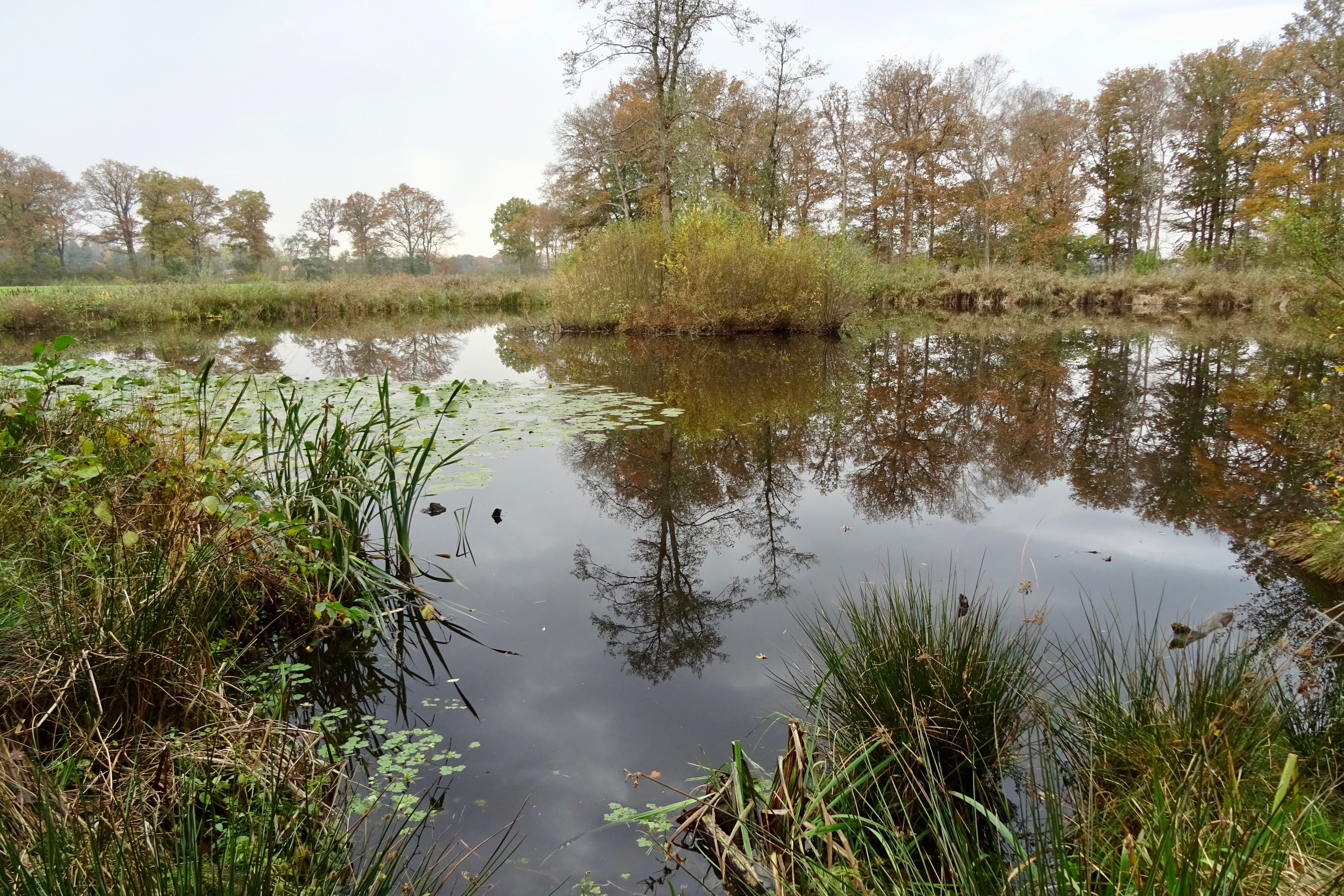
Vagevuur near Nietap

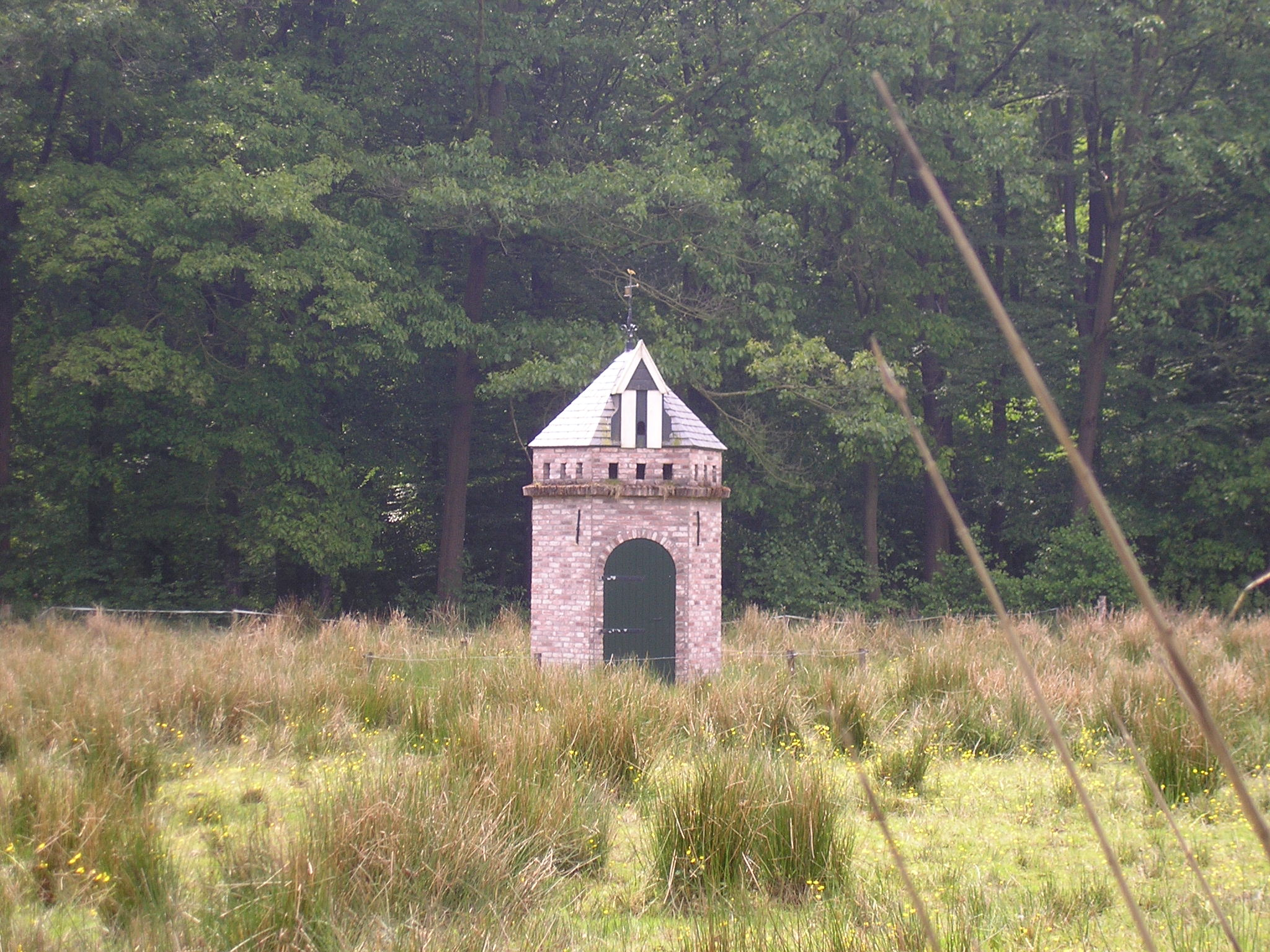
Dovecote near Nietap
