= Frank Tolbert =

Frank Tolbert may refer to:

- Frank E. Tolbert (1910–1980), Liberian politician
- Frank X. Tolbert (1912–1984), American journalist
