= Oostwold, Westerkwartier =

Oostwold
- Village
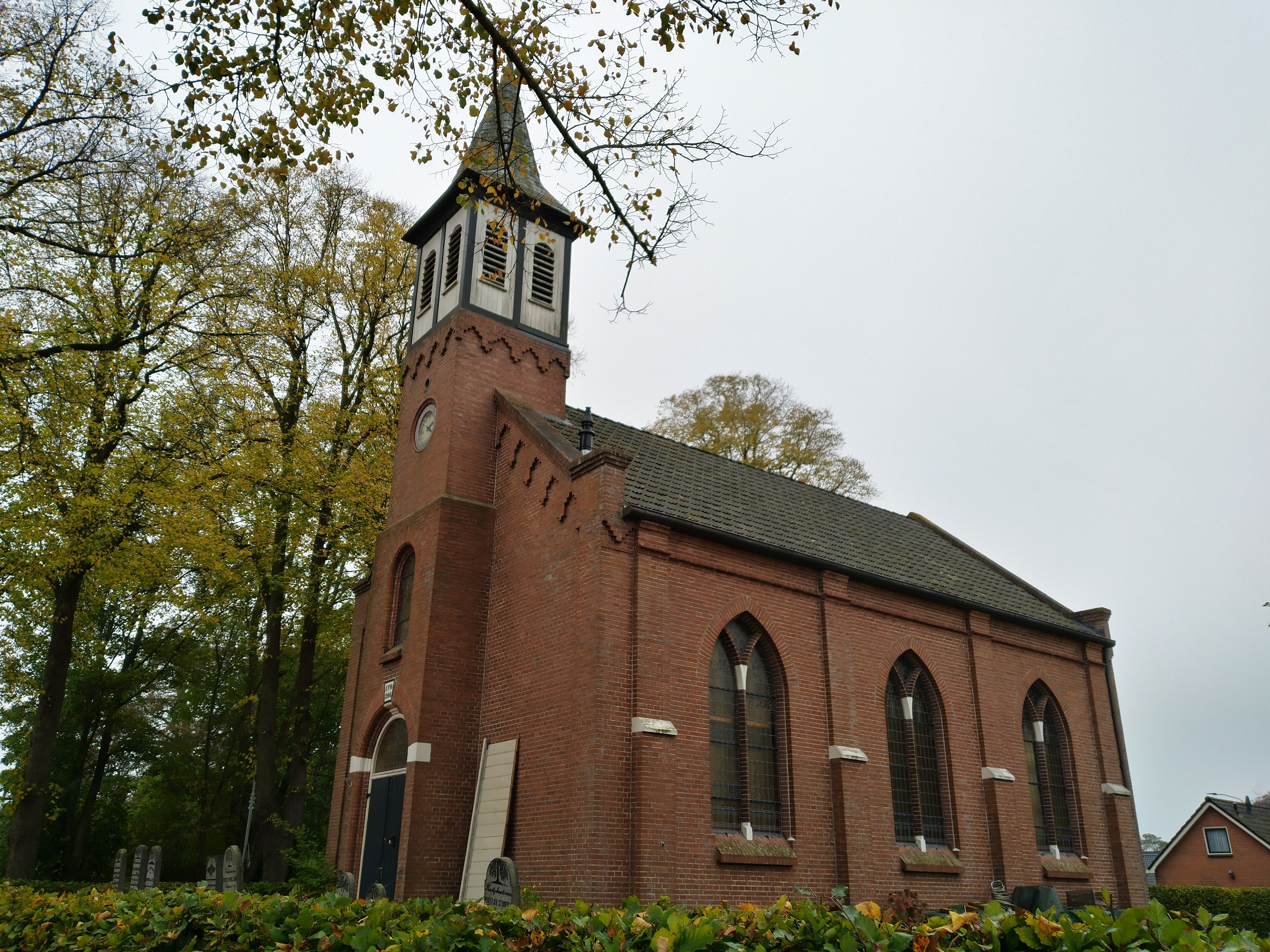
- Protestant Church

- Flag

- Location on a map of Groningen (province) Oostwold (Netherlands)
- Coordinates: 53°12′05″N 06°26′29″E
- Country: Netherlands
- Province: Groningen
- Municipality: Westerkwartier

Area
  - Total: 4.36 km^{2} (1.68 sq mi)
- Elevation: −0.4 m (−1.3 ft)

Population (2021)
  - Total: 680
  - Density: 160/km^{2} (400/sq mi)
- Time zone: UTC+1 (CET)
  - Summer (DST): UTC+2 (CEST)
- Postal code: 9828
- Dialing code: 0597

Oostwold (Dutch pronunciation: [ˈoːstʋɔlt]) is a village in the municipality of Westerkwartier in the province of Groningen in the Netherlands.

== History ==
The village was first mentioned in 1458 as Oestwolde, and means "eastern woods".

In 1908, the Reformed church was built as a replacement for its medieval predecessor. It was decommissioned in 2004 and in 2005 bought by the restaurant next door for parties, meetings, and congresses.

Oostwold was home to 254 people in 1840.

== Gallery ==
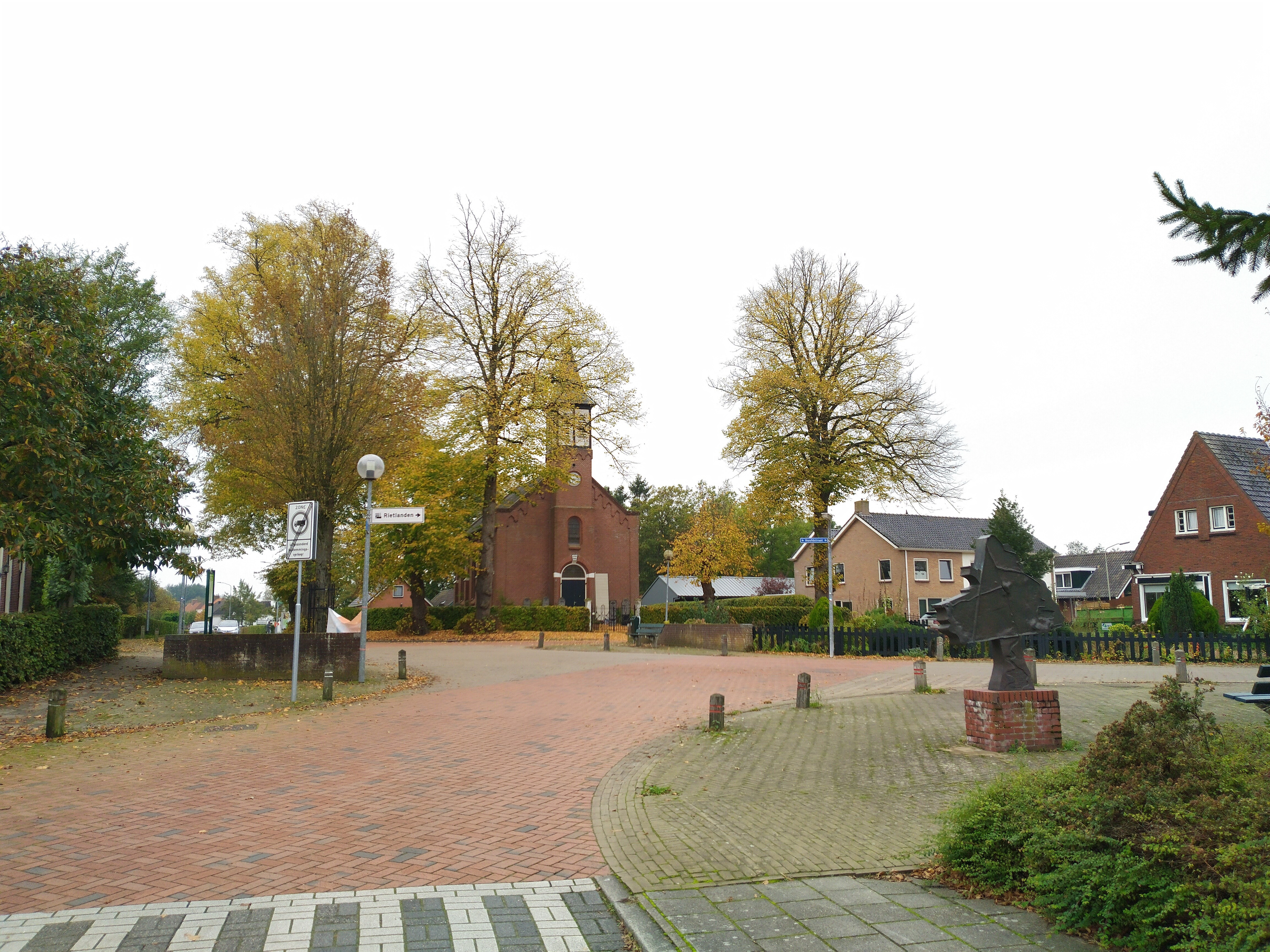
Main street

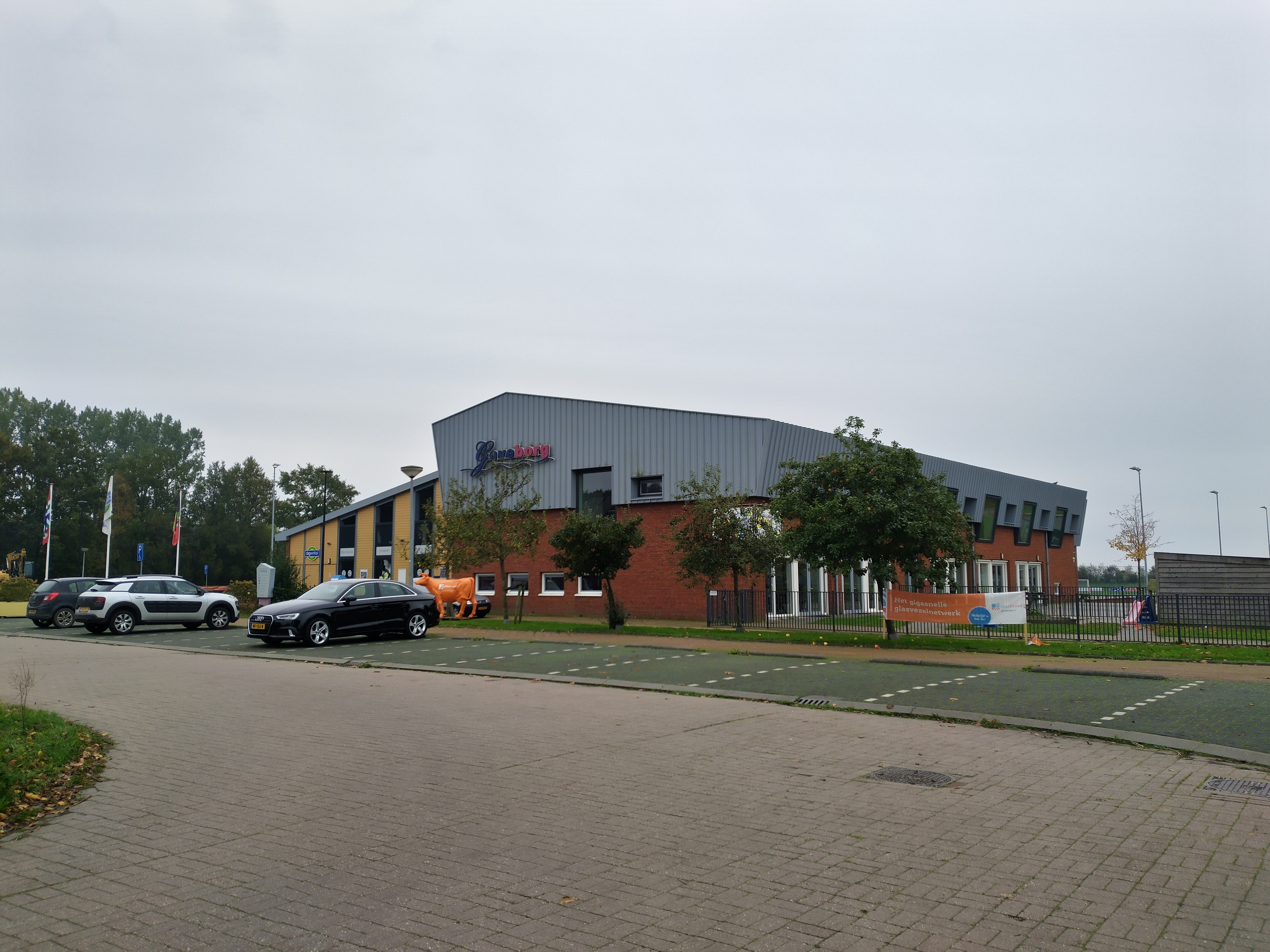
Sports centre

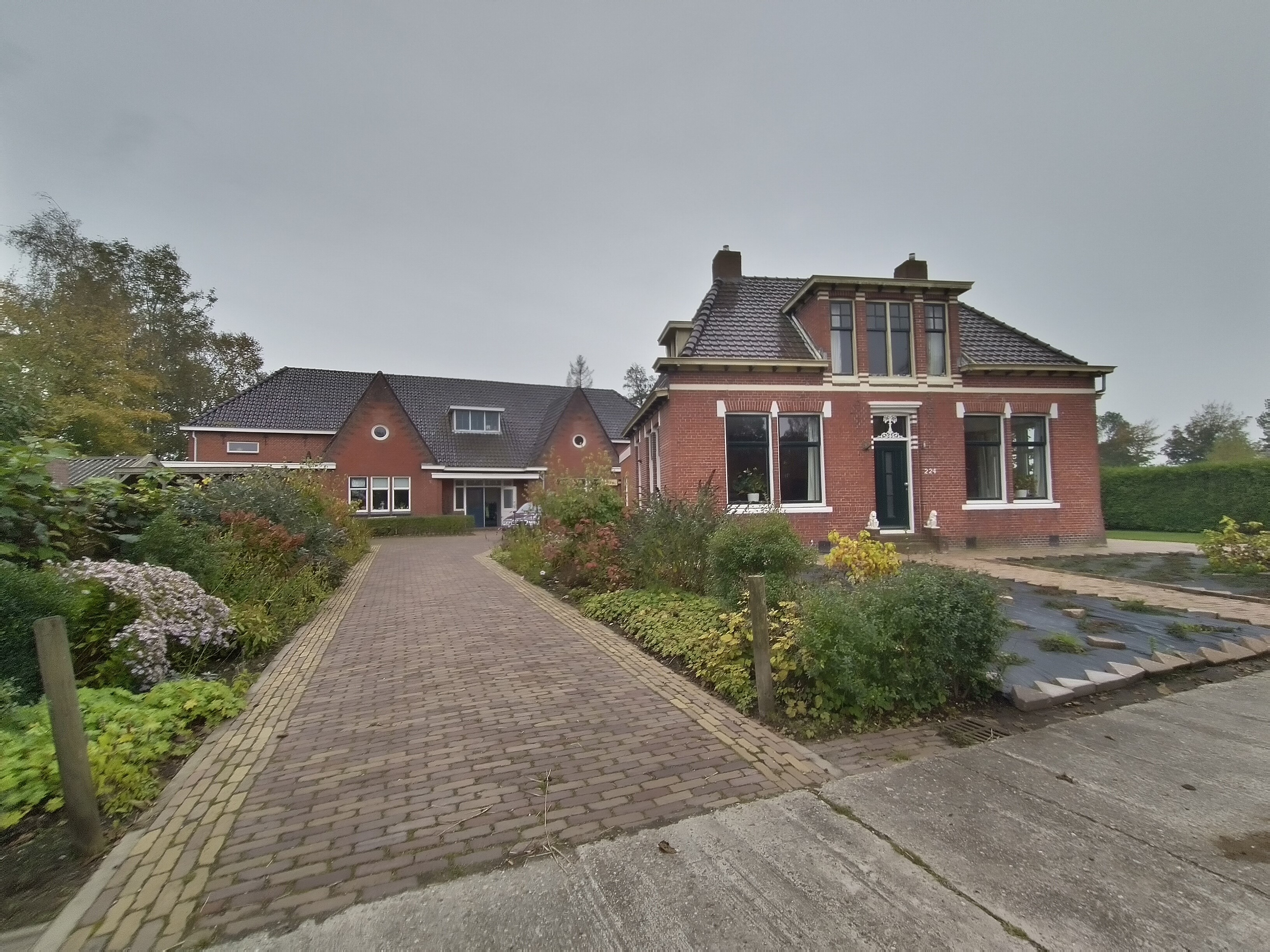
Former school
