= Aalsum =

Aalsum may refer to:

- Aalsum, Friesland, a village in the Netherlands
- Aalsum, Groningen, a village in the Netherlands
