= Niezijl =

Niezijl Nijziel (Gronings) Bomsterzijl
- Village
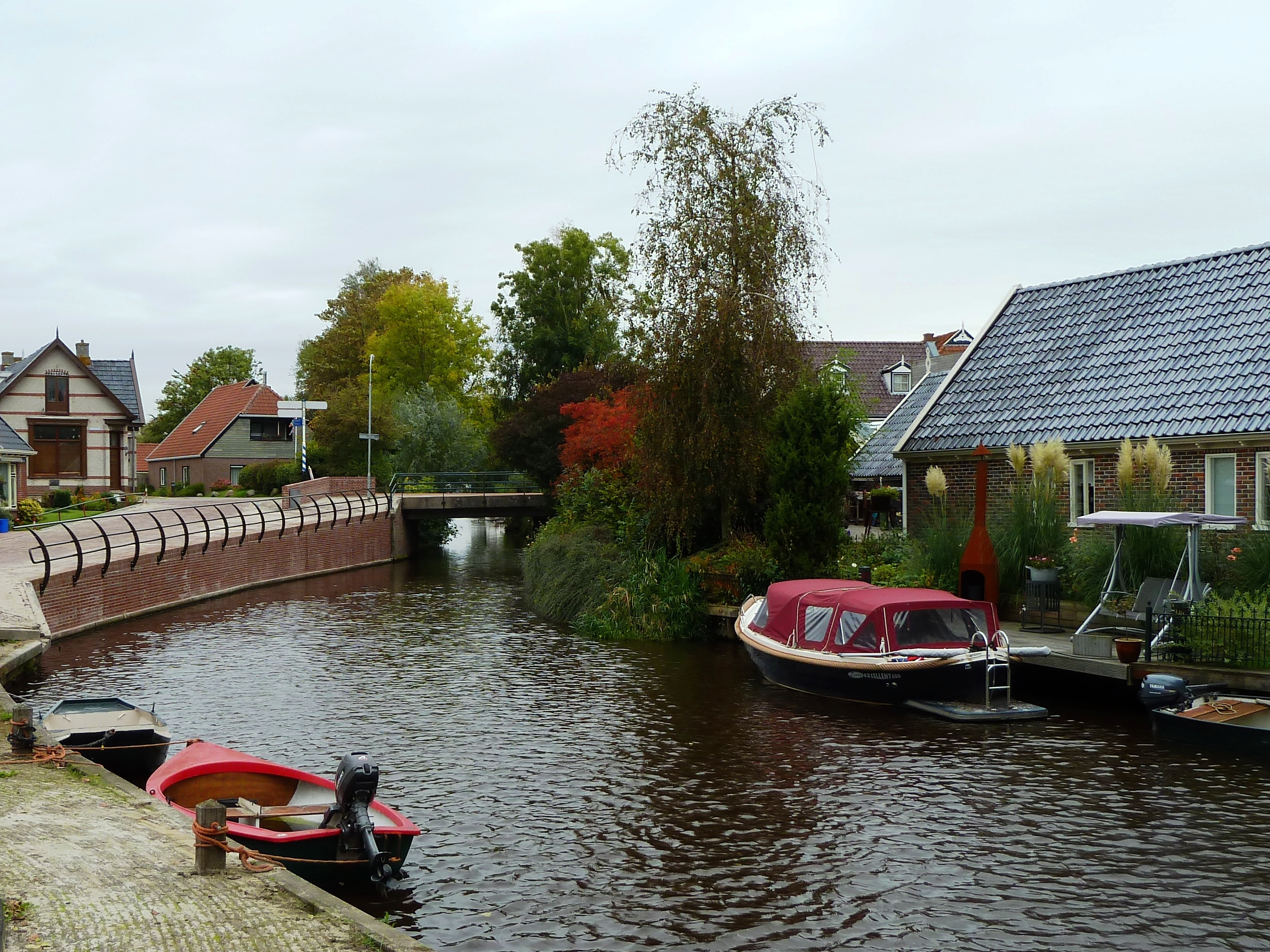
- The Hoerediep in Niezijl

- Location in the province of Groningen in the Netherlands Niezijl (Netherlands)
- Coordinates: 53°16′N 6°21′E
- Country: Netherlands
- Province: Groningen
- Municipality: Westerkwartier
- Elevation: 0.9 m (3.0 ft)

Population (2021)
  - Total: 420
- Time zone: UTC+1 (CET)
  - Summer (DST): UTC+2 (CEST)
- Postcode: 9342
- Area code: 0594

Niezijl (Dutch: [ˈnizɛil]; Gronings: Nijziel), historically Bomsterzijl (probably from bom, meaning 'low, water-enclosed piece of land'), is a village in the municipality of Westerkwartier in the province of Groningen in the Netherlands. The village is located between Grijpskerk and Zuidhorn on the N355, the trunk highway from Leeuwarden to Groningen. As of 2021, Niezijl had a population of 420. The village is intersected by two canals, the Niezijlsterdiep and the Hoerediep.

The village originally belonged to the Juursemakluft in the parish Grijpskerk. It got its own church in 1651 and has been an independent church ever since. South of the village, on the Van Starkenborgh Canal, is a restored polder mill, the Zwakkenburgermolen.

== History ==
The name of Niezijl refers to the new zijl (nie meaning 'new', and zijl meaning 'lock'). Originally there was a sea lock, the Bomsterzijl, just west of present-day Niezijl. Only in 1562, a new lock was built, which was later called Niezijl. This name appears for the first time on Sibrandus Leo's map of the province of Friesland from 1579. Simultaneously with the construction of the lock, the Niezijlsterdiep or Nyesloterdiep was dug, which improved the drainage of the hinterland.

During the Eighty Years' War, the Bomsterschans near Niezijl was the only support point for the Staatsgezinden in the province of Groningen for a while. Several Spanish attempts to conquer the sconce (including from Kommerzijl) failed, see Siege of Niezijl (1581).

The village had its own school until 1996 (CBS De Sluis). This school was founded in 1957 with three classes and was expanded in 1978 with a community room and a kindergarten. After having continued to exist for a number of years below the legal standard of 52 pupils, the school merged in 1996 with CBS De Regenboog from Grijpskerk.

== Religion ==
The current Reformed Church of Niezijl dates from 1661 and replaced a cheap building from 1650 that soon proved too small. The pulpit is from the 17th century; the organ is from the 18th century and was rebuilt in 1879 by Friedrich Leichel and sons from Arnhem. In 1791 an almshouse was founded by the ecclesiastical diaconate, which was replaced in 1912 by a hospice. After the 1834 Reformed Church split, a reformed church was founded in 1851, which, in addition to Niezijl, also had Grijpskerk (until 1901), Kommerzijl (until 1912), Noordhornertolhek and Oldekerk and the surrounding area (until 1860) as its church community. In 1892 the congregation had 1300 members. Originally, the church had two side wings (demolished before 1964). After the Vrijmaking of 1944, the liberated church acquired control of the building and in 1951 a new Reformed church building was founded on the edge of the village. All three meetinghouses are either decommissioned or used only for special gatherings. The Liberated church from 1851 is owned by the organist and church musician Sietze de Vries, who restored and rebuilt the organ of Marten Eertman from 1906 and who has taken a few organs and musical instruments into use in the church.

== Gallery ==
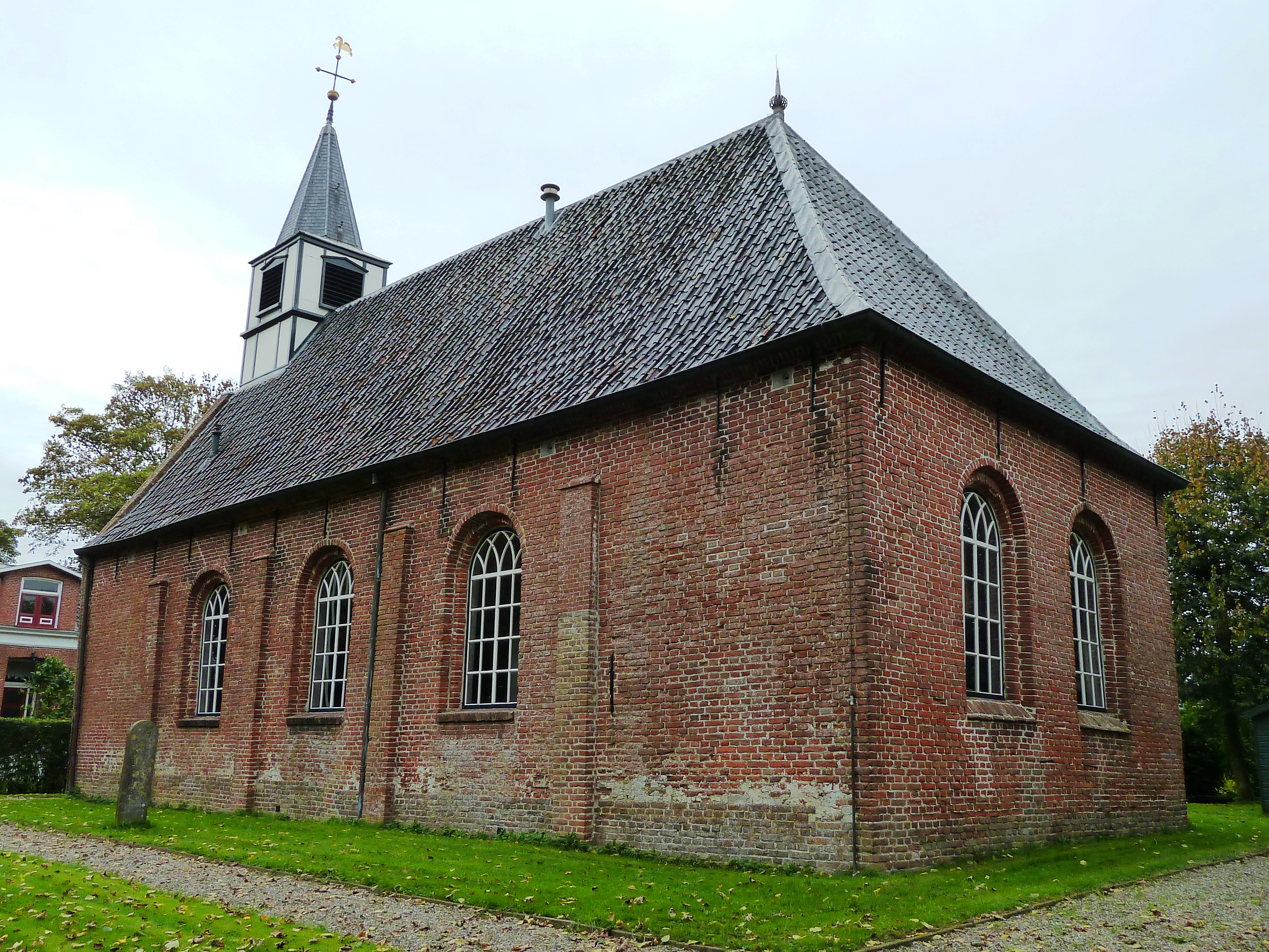
Reformed church from 1661

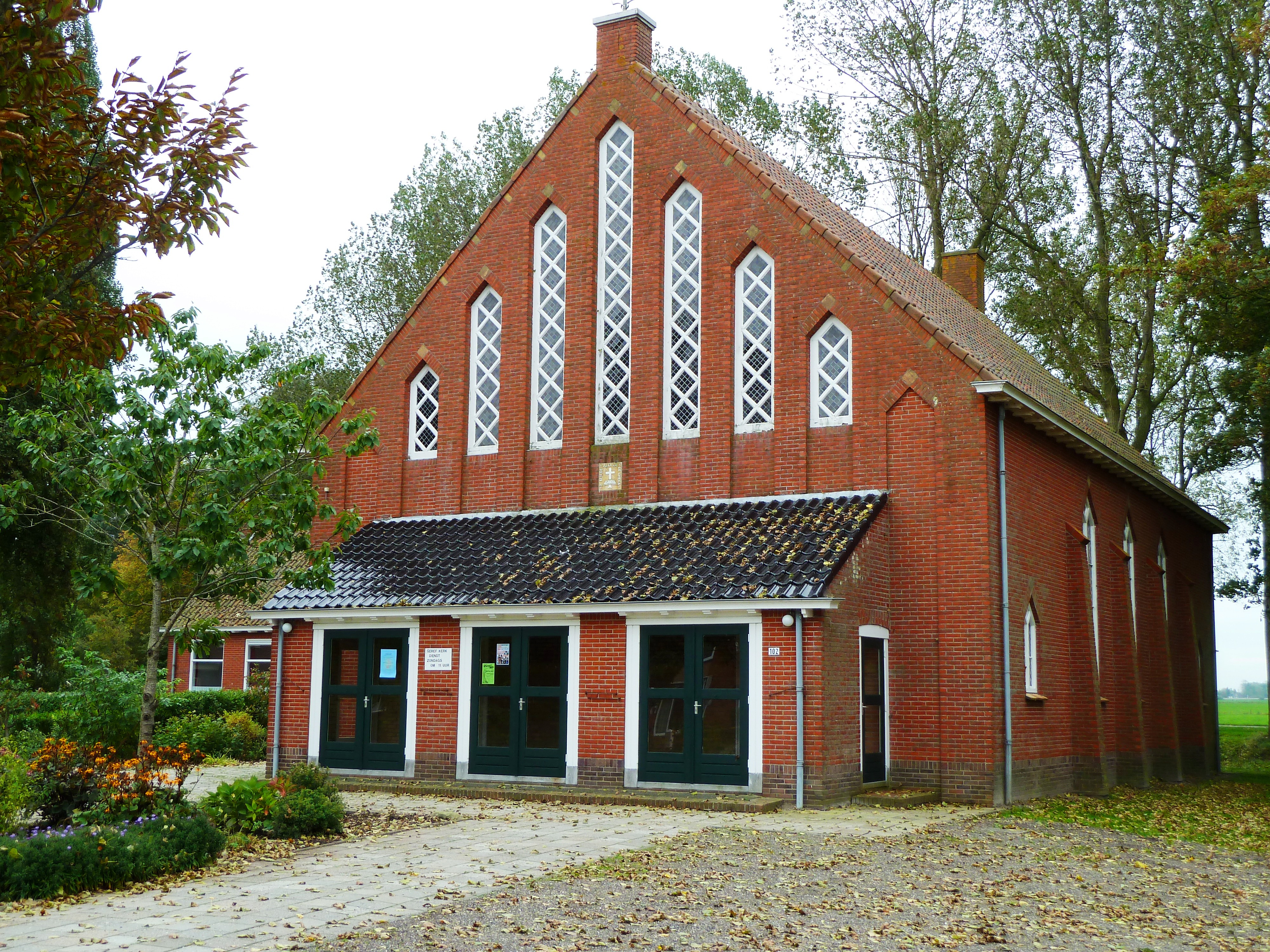
Reformed church from 1951

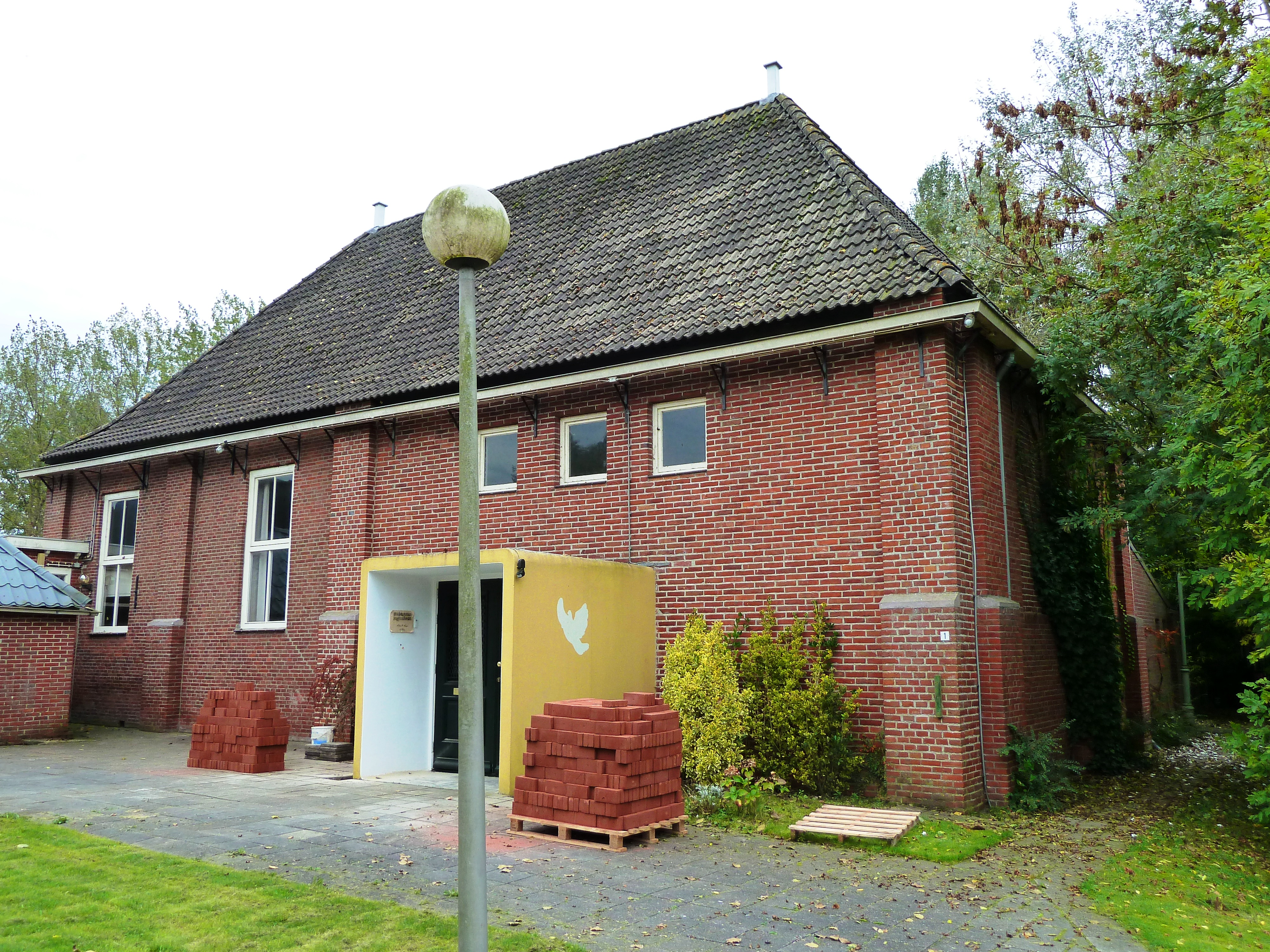
Liberated church from 1851

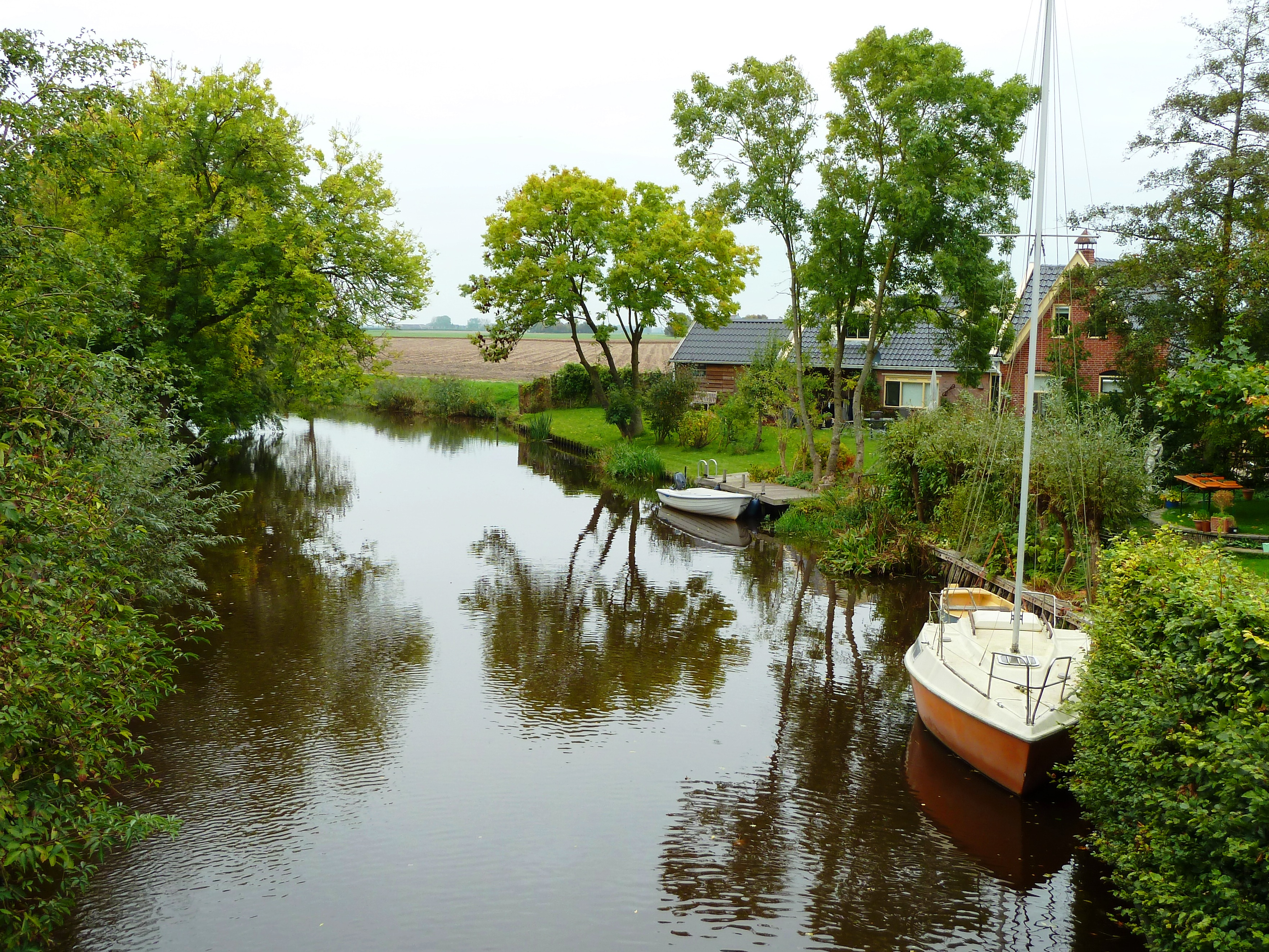
Kommerzijlsterdiep near Niezijl

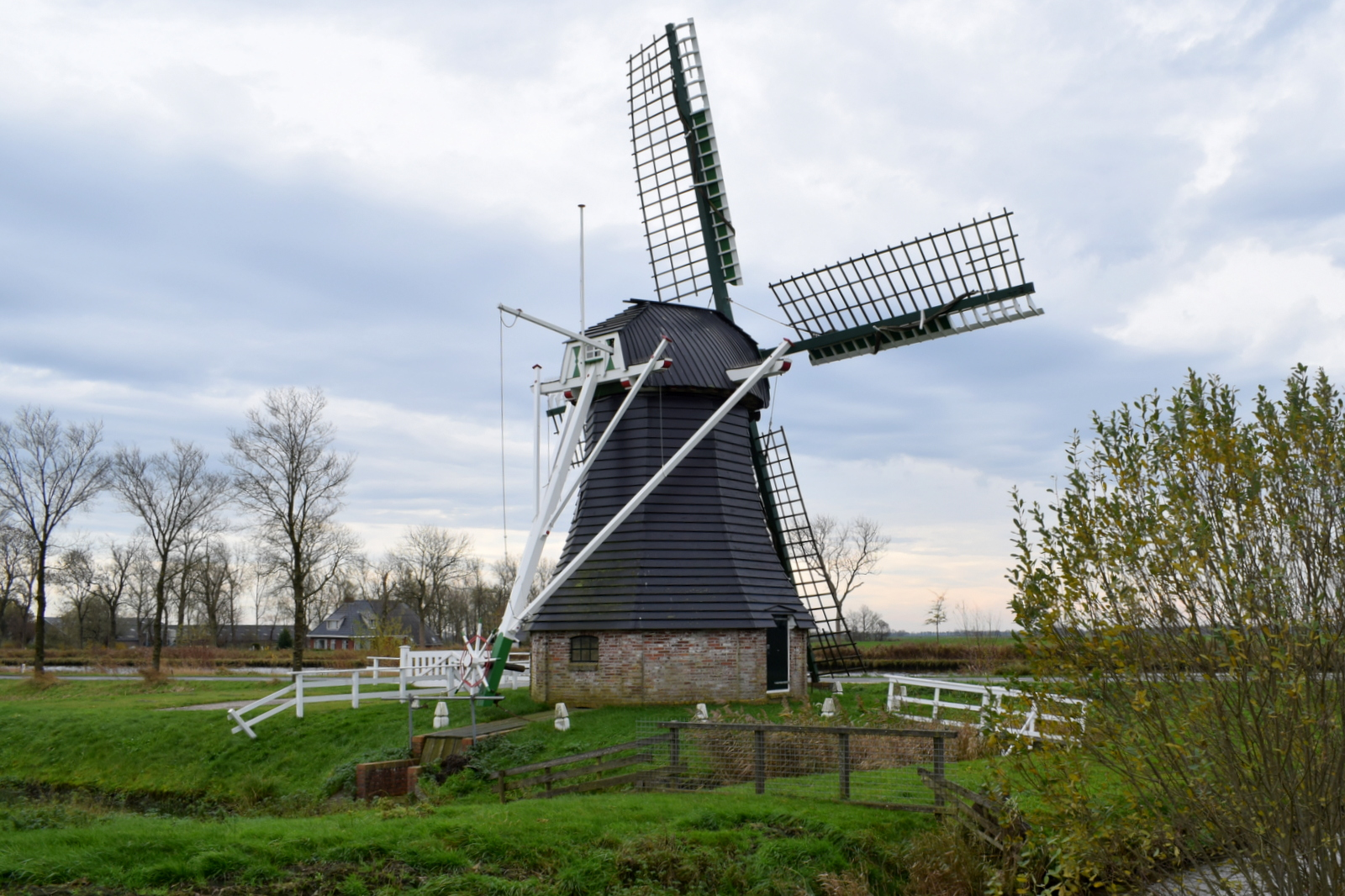
Zwakkenburgermolen
