= Aalsum, Groningen =

Aalsum
- Hamlet
- Location of Aalsum in the province of Groningen Aalsum (Netherlands) Aalsum (Europe)
- Coordinates: 53°18′25″N 6°22′12″E
- Country: Netherlands
- Province: Groningen
- Municipality: Westerkwartier
- Postcode: 9883

Aalsum (Dutch pronunciation: [ˈaːlsʏm]) is a small hamlet in the Dutch province of Groningen. It is located in the municipality of Westerkwartier, about 1.5 km west of Oldehove.

The hamlet was located on a wierde, an artificial dwelling hill. The hill was partially excavated in the 20th century; a bow from the ninth century was found. Plans to reconstruct the hill were canceled.

According to the 19th-century historian A.J. van der Aa, Aalsum had 80 inhabitants in the middle of the 19th century; presumably, this includes the surrounding countryside.

== Gallery ==
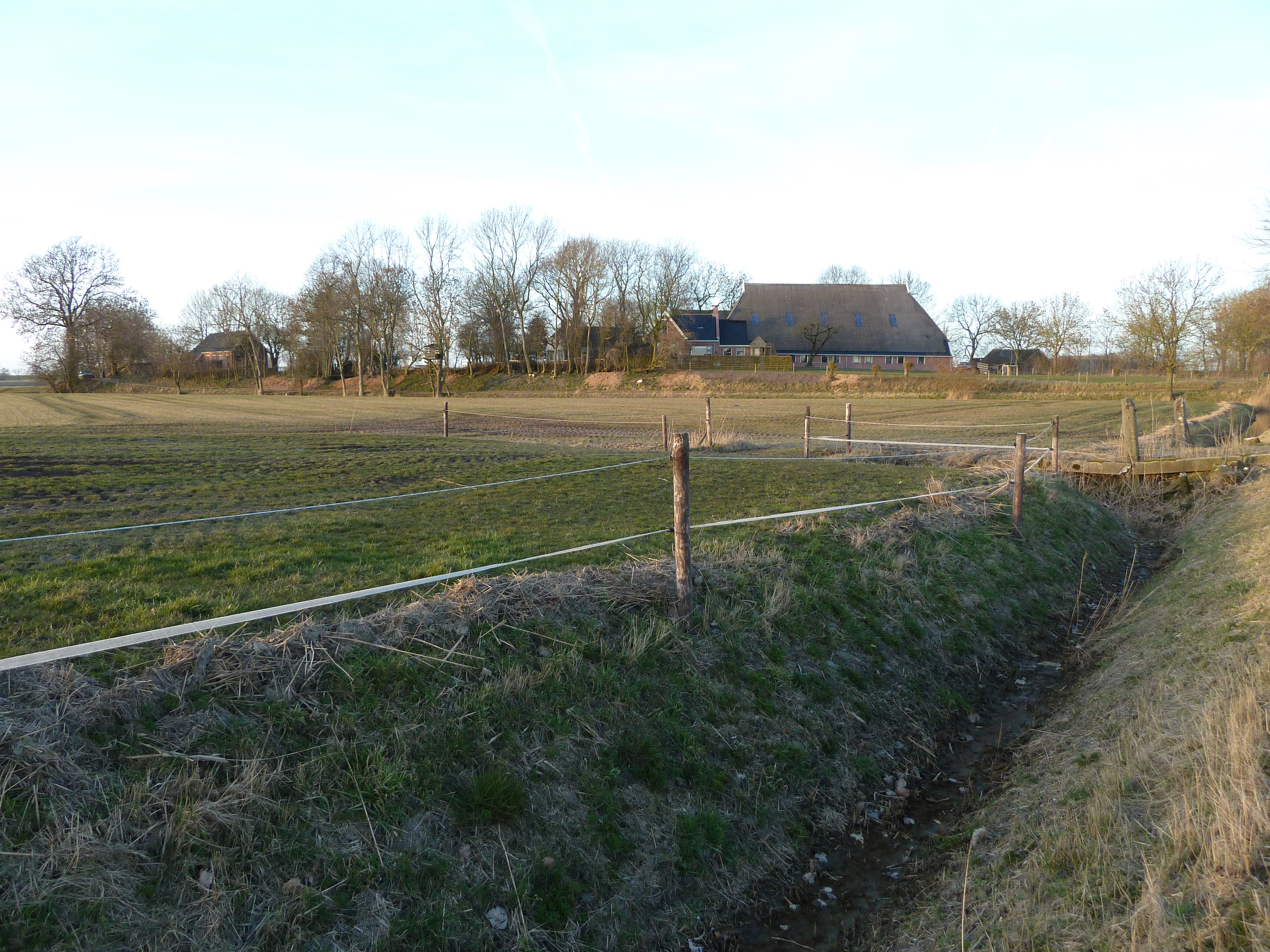
Wierde seen from the Aalsumerweg from the direction of Kommerzijl

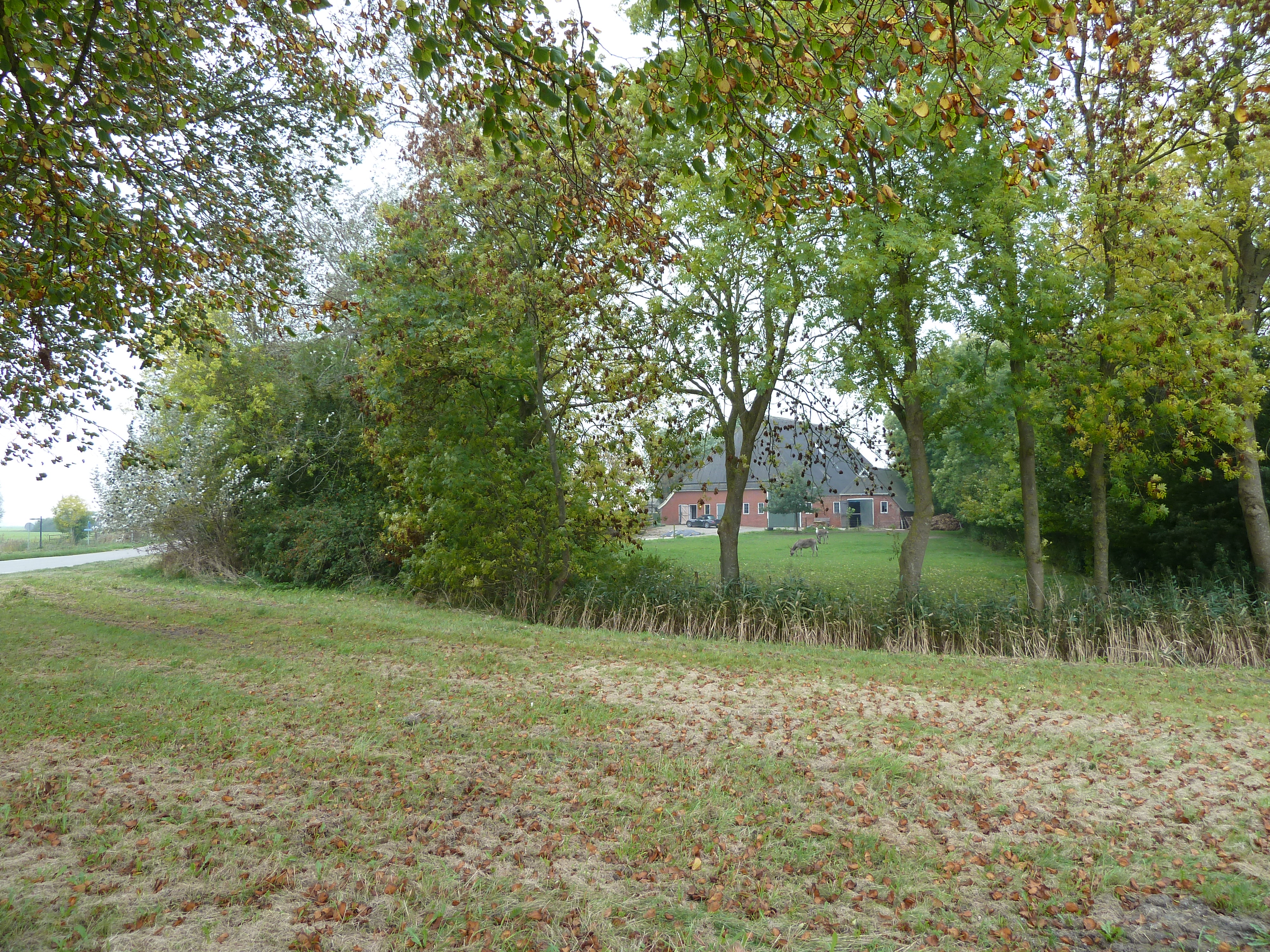
Wierde seen from the Aalsumerweg from the direction of Oldehove

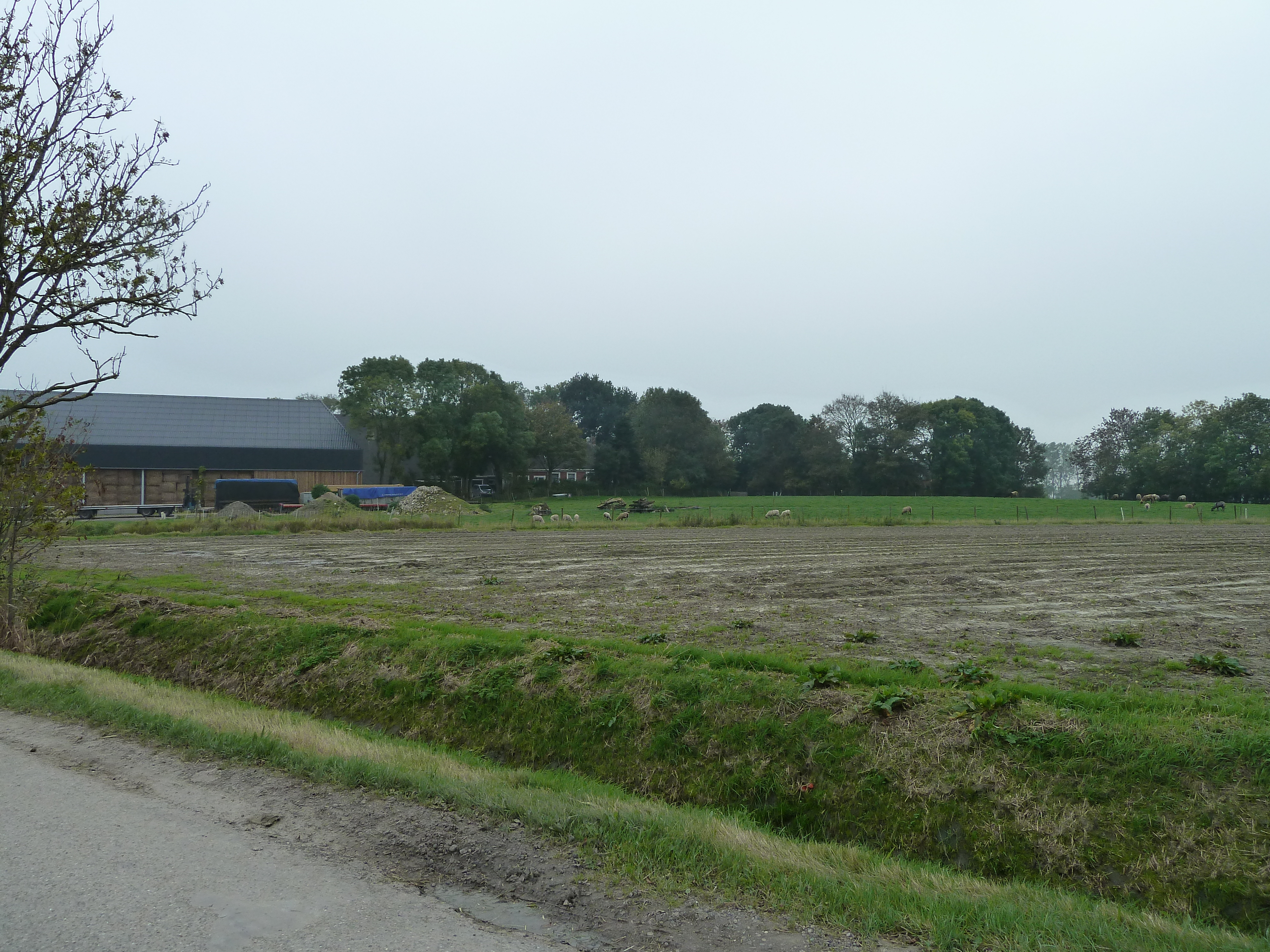
Wierde seen from the Electraweg
