= Jan Wiegers =

Dutch expressionist painter

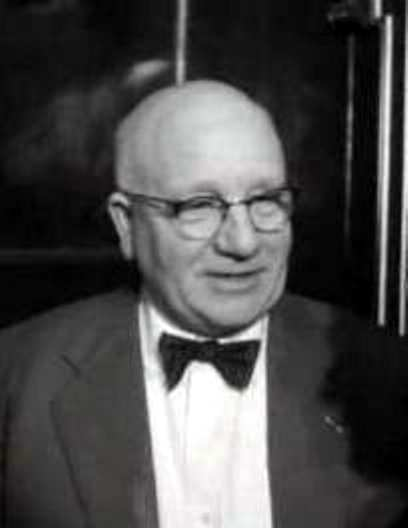
- Jan Wiegers in 1956
- Born: 30 July 1893; Kommerzijl, Netherlands
- Died: 30 November 1959 (aged 66); Amsterdam, Netherlands
- Known for: Painting

Jan Wiegers (Kommerzijl, 31 July 1893 – Amsterdam, 30 November 1959) was a Dutch expressionist painter.Wiegers was educated as a sculptor at the Academie Minerva in Groningen, but he also studied painting at the Academies of Rotterdam under A. H. R. Van Maasdijk and The Hague under Frederik Jansen.

Having left the academies he produced paintings, sculptures, wood-carvings and furniture for churches throughout Germany and Switzerland. In 1917 he became a member of the group of artists called De Ploeg (the plough), a similar group to Die Brücke but with a tendency towards abstraction.

During a stay in the Davos in 1920, he became friends with the German Expressionist Ernst Ludwig Kirchner who became a strong influence on his art. In 1934 he moved to Amsterdam and co-founded the magazine De kroniek van kunst en kultuur. In 1953 he was appointed professor of the National Academy. Wiegers' work was included in the 1939 exhibition and sale Onze Kunst van Heden (Our Art of Today) at the Rijksmuseum in Amsterdam.

Wiegers died 30 November 1959 in Amsterdam.
