= Siege of Niezijl =

1581 siege

- Part of the Eighty Years' War
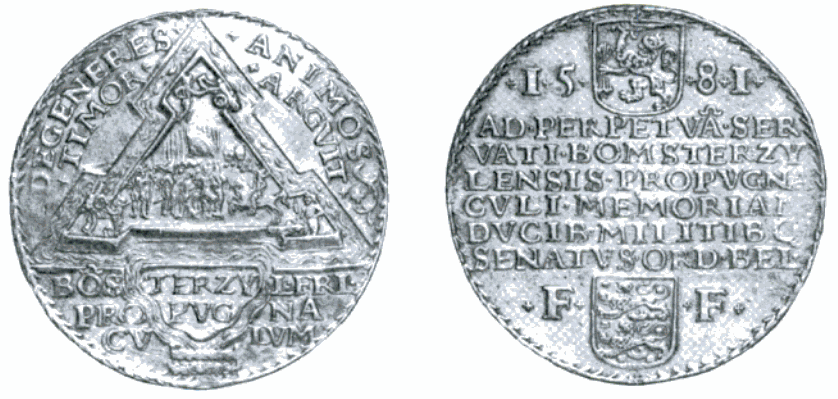
- Commemorative coin of the siege of Niezijl in 1581
Date	3 to 24 October 1581
Location	Niezijl, Province of Groningen (Present day Netherlands)
Result	States-General victory

Belligerents
(Dutch Republic) States-General	Spain

Commanders and leaders
(Dutch Republic) John Norreys (Dutch Republic) William Louis	(Spain) Francisco Verdugo

The siege of Niezijl was a siege of the town of Niezijl that took place between 3 and 24 October 1581 in the Dutch States, during the Eighty Years' War. The Spanish under Colonel Francisco Verdugo laid siege to the place after his victory at the battle of Noordhorn but the siege failed and Verdrugo retreated leaving the English and Dutch under John Norreys and William Louis respectively the victors.

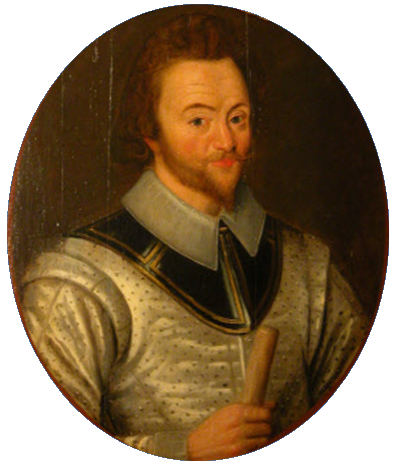
Sir John Norreys

Count Rennenberg, Stadtholder of Friesland, had betrayed the cities of Groningen, Oldenzaal, Coevorden, and Delfzijl to Spanish control and himself became a turncoat. As a result Catholics would no longer be trusted with high posts in the States army. The Spanish Army of Flanders led by Francisco Verdugo, was succeeded as governor of the Northern Provinces, advanced south of the Lauwerszee to invade Friesland and to force the Republic into signing a negotiation. After their defeat at Noordhorn on 30 September the Dutch and English retreated to Niezijl where they established themselves behind the defensive fortifications. Verdugo's army, although delayed by mutinies, were in pursuit and then began to besiege Niezijl.

Niezijl was the only place barring Friesland and its capture would be important to the Catholic and Spanish cause. The Dutch and English resistance was much tougher than expected, repelling assaults and withstanding a heavy bombardment. After three weeks, Verdugo who was also dealing with mutinies in his ranks decided to give up the siege. The autumnal floods made the Frisian land impassable for the armies, and thus Verdugo moved with his troops to the dry land of Drenthe, while Norreys kept the remains of his army behind the IJssel river.

Niezijl remained the only place in the Ommelanden that the Dutch kept, thus giving the States forces a base to use. As a consequence from 1589 William Louis and Maurice of Nassau began a laborious reconquest of the Spanish territories which only ended with the capture of Groningen on 22 July 1594.
