= Kommerzijl =

Kommerzijl Kommerziel (Gronings)
- Village
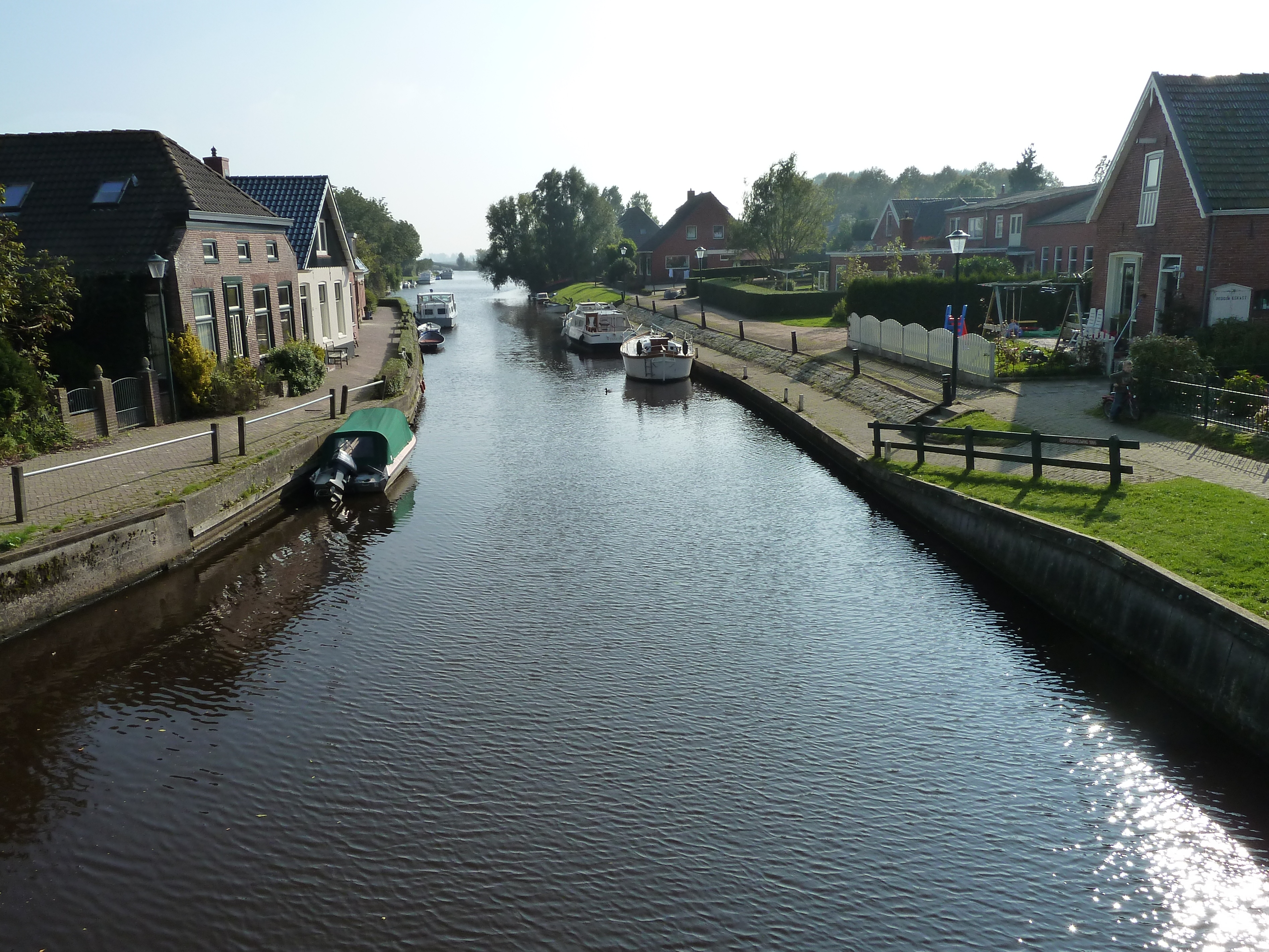
- View of the Kommerzijlsterdiep in Kommerzijl

- Location in the province of Groningen in the Netherlands Kommerzijl (Netherlands)
- Coordinates: 53°17′N 6°19′E
- Country: Netherlands
- Province: Groningen
- Municipality: Westerkwartier
- Elevation: 1.6 m (5.2 ft)

Population (2021)
  - Total: 505
- Time zone: UTC+1 (CET)
  - Summer (DST): UTC+2 (CEST)
- Postcode: 9880-9882
- Area code: 0594

Kommerzijl (Dutch: [ˈkɔmərˌzɛil]; Gronings: Kommerziel), until the end of the 17th century called Opslachterzijl, is a linear village in the municipality of Westerkwartier in the province of Groningen in the Netherlands, located on the Kommerzijlsterdiep, which continues after the village as Kommerzijlsterriet and flows into the Reitdiep. To the west of the village lies the Ruigewaard and to the east the Humsterland. As of 2021, Kommerzijl had a population of 505.

== Etymology ==
Until the middle of the 17th century, the name Opslachterzijl was used for zijl and village. The name Kommerzijl appears for the first time in 1602. The suffix -zijl refers to the lock (zijl) where the village originated. There are two explanations for the stem kommer-: It could refer to the kom ('harbour') behind the dike, where the ships were docked or it could refer to the kommer ('care') associated with the construction and maintenance of the lock. The sconce and the lock can be seen in the coat of arms of Kommerzijl, which was designed for its 400th anniversary.

== Gallery ==
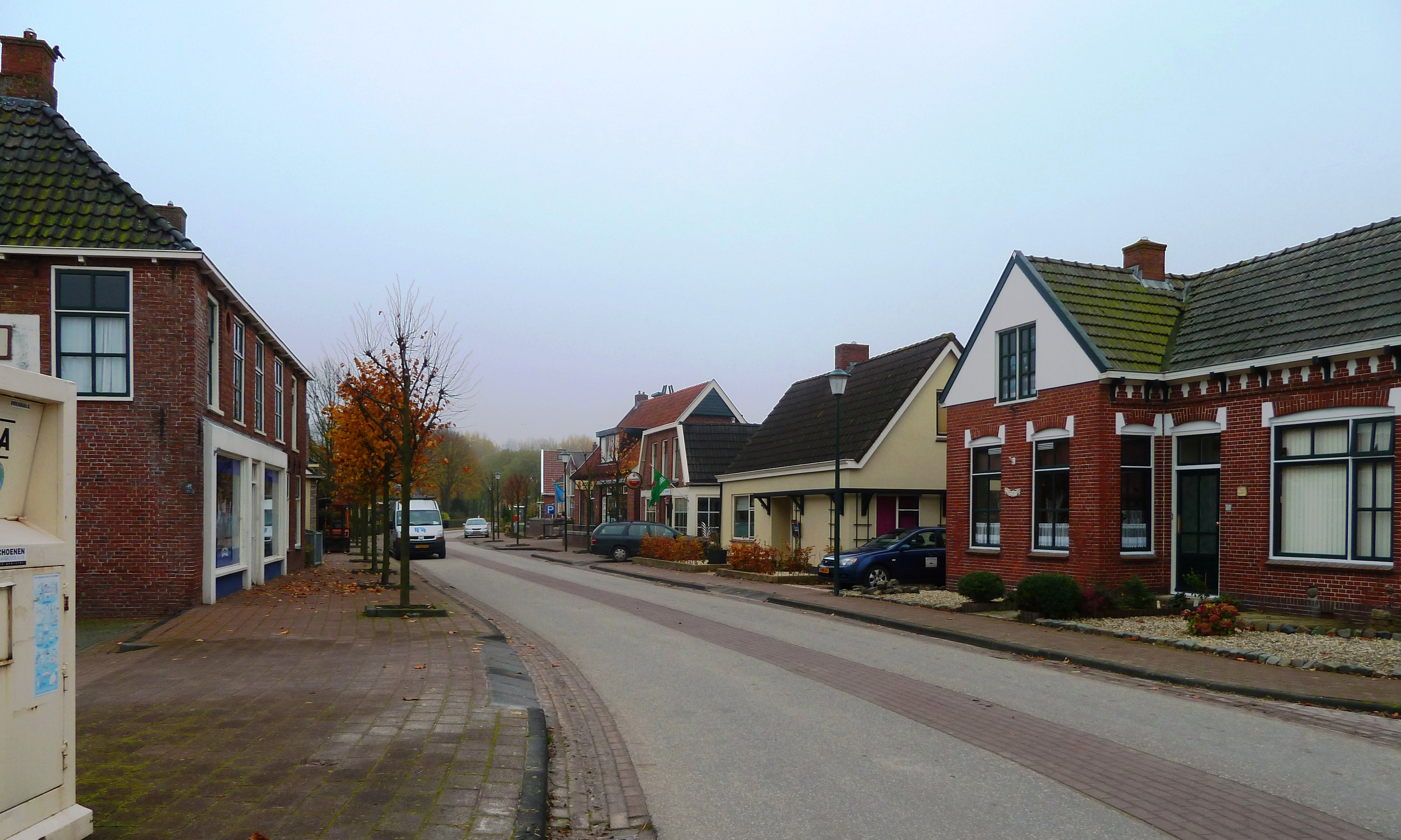
Dorpsstraat towards Niezijl

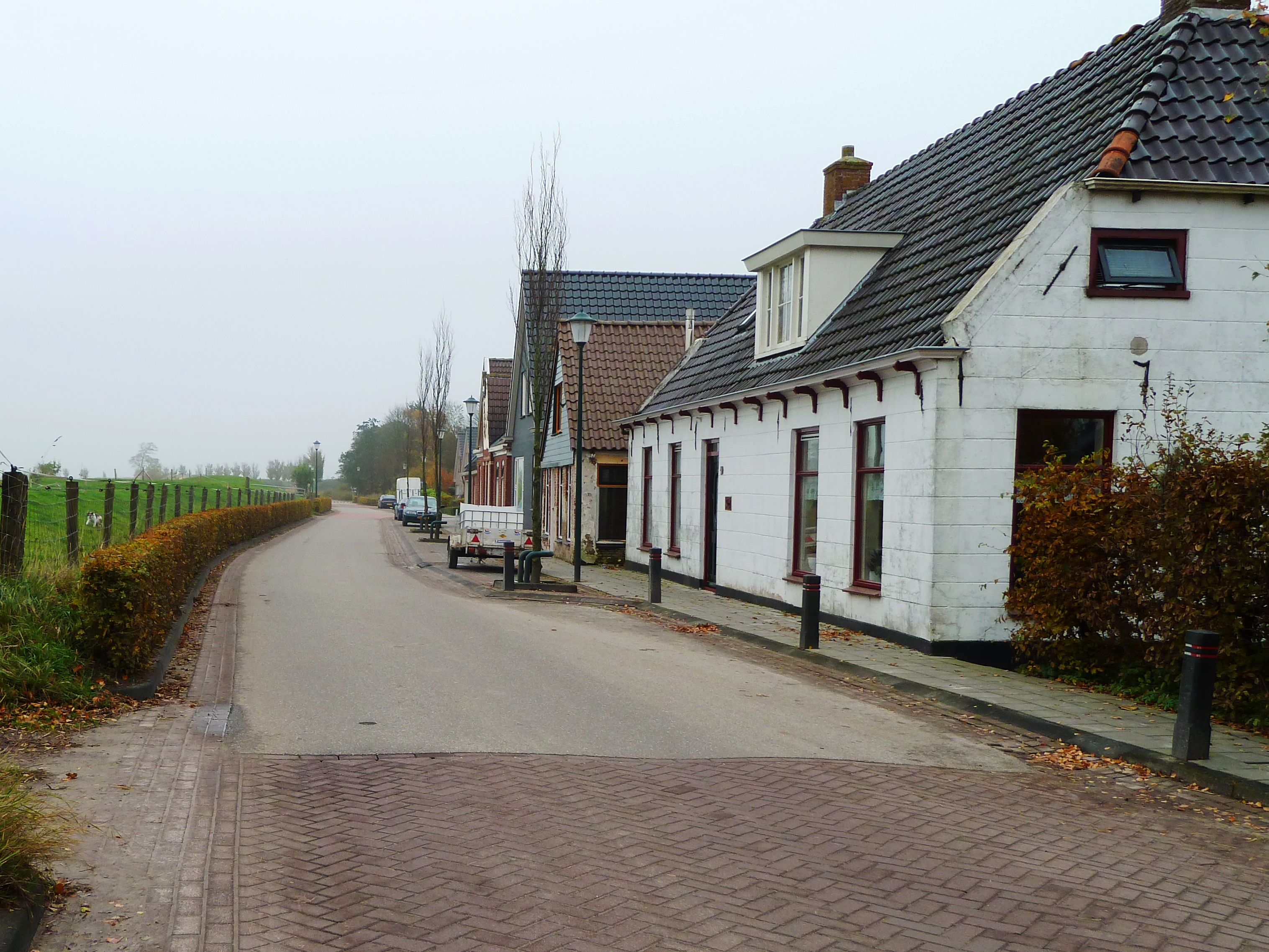
Pamaweg towards Oldehove

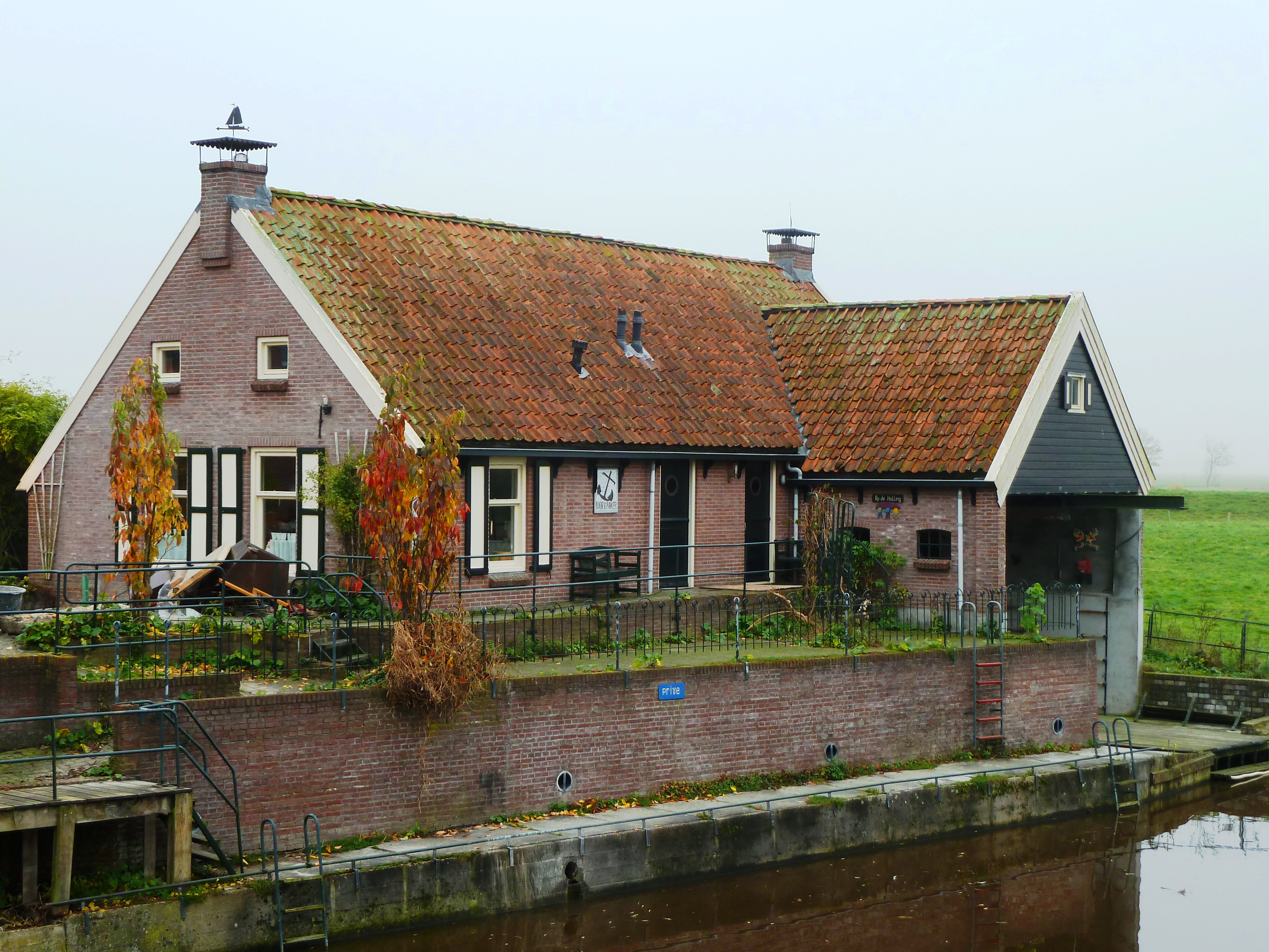
House on the Kommerzijlsterriet

== Notable people ==
- Jan Wiegers (1893-1959), expressionist painter of De Ploeg
