= Aalsum, Friesland =

Aalsum Ealsum
- Village
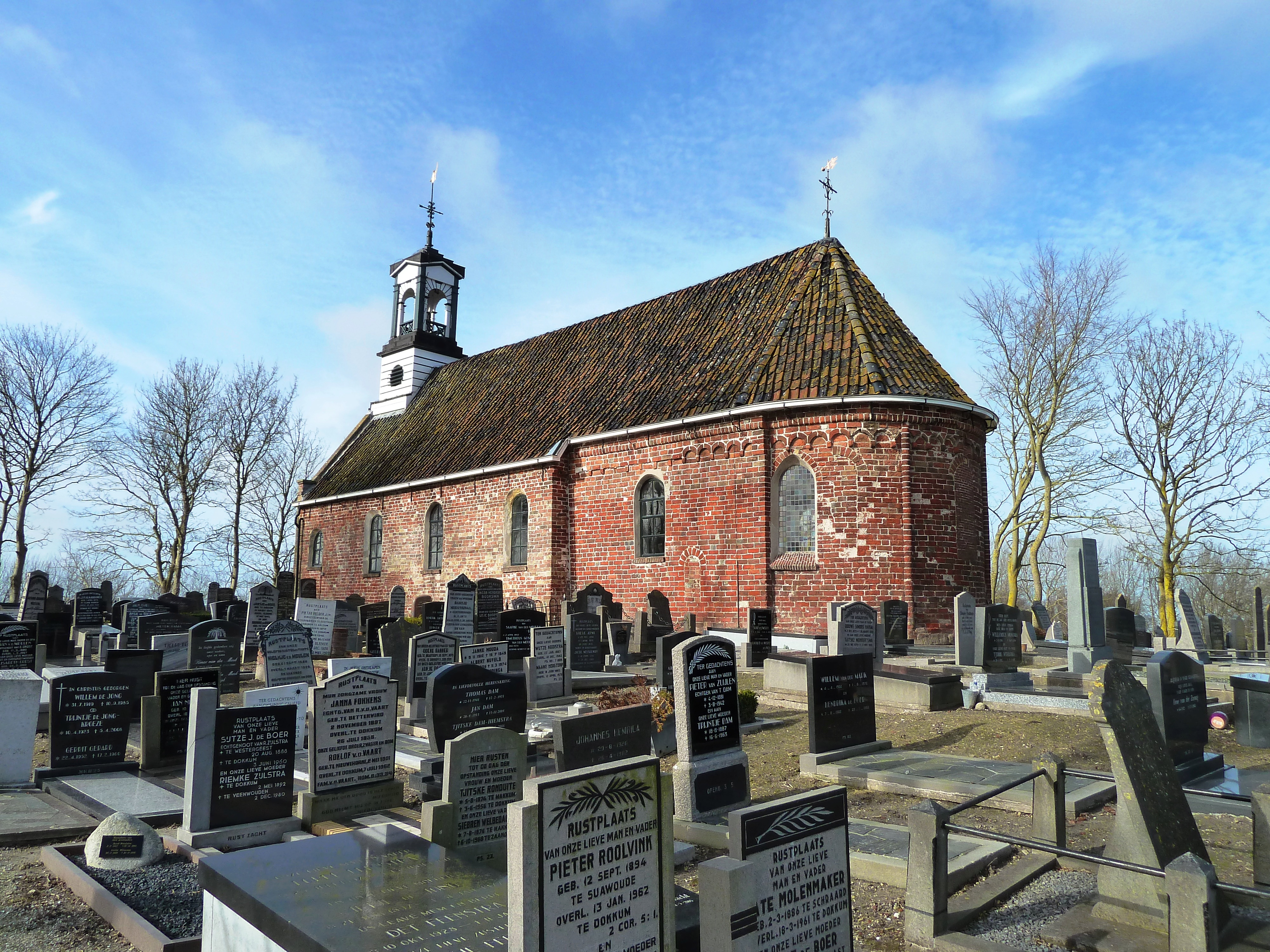
- Aalsum church

- Flag Coat of arms

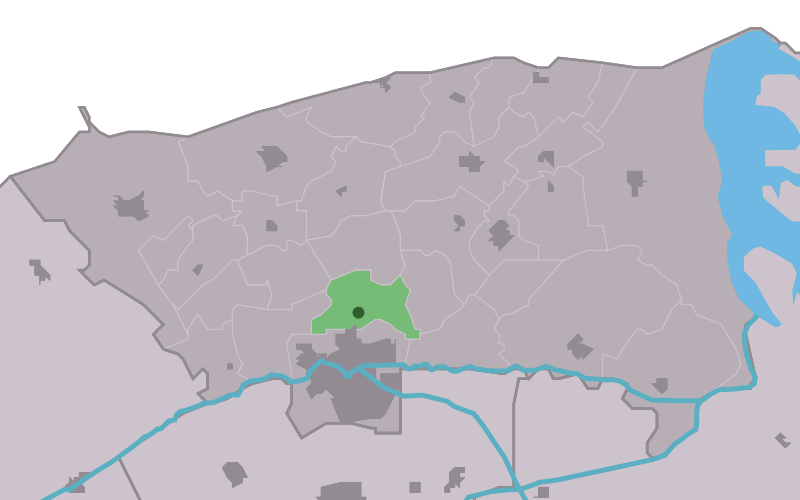
- Location in the former Dongeradeel municipality

- Location in the Netherlands Aalsum (Netherlands)
- Country: Netherlands
- Province: Friesland
- Municipality: Noardeast-Fryslân

Area
  - Total: 4.39 km^{2} (1.69 sq mi)
- Elevation: 0.5 m (1.6 ft)

Population (2021)
  - Total: 130
  - Density: 30/km^{2} (77/sq mi)
- Time zone: UTC+1 (CET)
  - Summer (DST): UTC+2 (CEST)
- Postal code: 9121
- Dialing code: 0519

Aalsum (West Frisian: Ealsum) is a village in the Dutch province of Friesland. It is located in the municipality Noardeast-Fryslân, about 1 km north of Dokkum. It had a population of around 125 in January 2017

Aalsum is built on a partially excavated terp, around a church originally dedicated to St. Catherine of Alexandria, which dates back to approximately 1200 AD.

== History ==
The village was first mentioned in 944 as Atlesheim, and means "settlement of the people of Athal (person)". In 1840, Aalsum was home to 306 people. Aalsum is a terp (artificial living mound) village. The terp dated from the 5th to 7th century, and was 5 metres (16 ft) high.

The St. Catherine church dates from the 12th century. The nave was enlarged around 1500. In 1843, the tower and western wing were demolished. The wing was restored, but however the tower was replaced by a simple belfry.

During the 1880s, most of the terp was excavated. During the excavation, pottery, gold and bronze jewelry and 27 Carolingian denarii (silver coins) were discovered.

Aalsum used to have a railway station (Dokkum-Aalsum) on the North Friesland Railway, which opened in 1901. It became the terminus for passenger services in May 1935 and closed to passengers in July 1936.

In 1965, the monument Droppinghiem was revealed, because the farm of Veeninga was used for weapon drops for the Dutch resistance. In the autumn of 1944, 86 containers of weapons, ammunition and explosives were dropped at the farm. Until 2019, the village was part of the Dongeradeel municipality.

== Notable inhabitants ==
- Rink van der Velde (1932–2001), writer and journalist

== Gallery ==
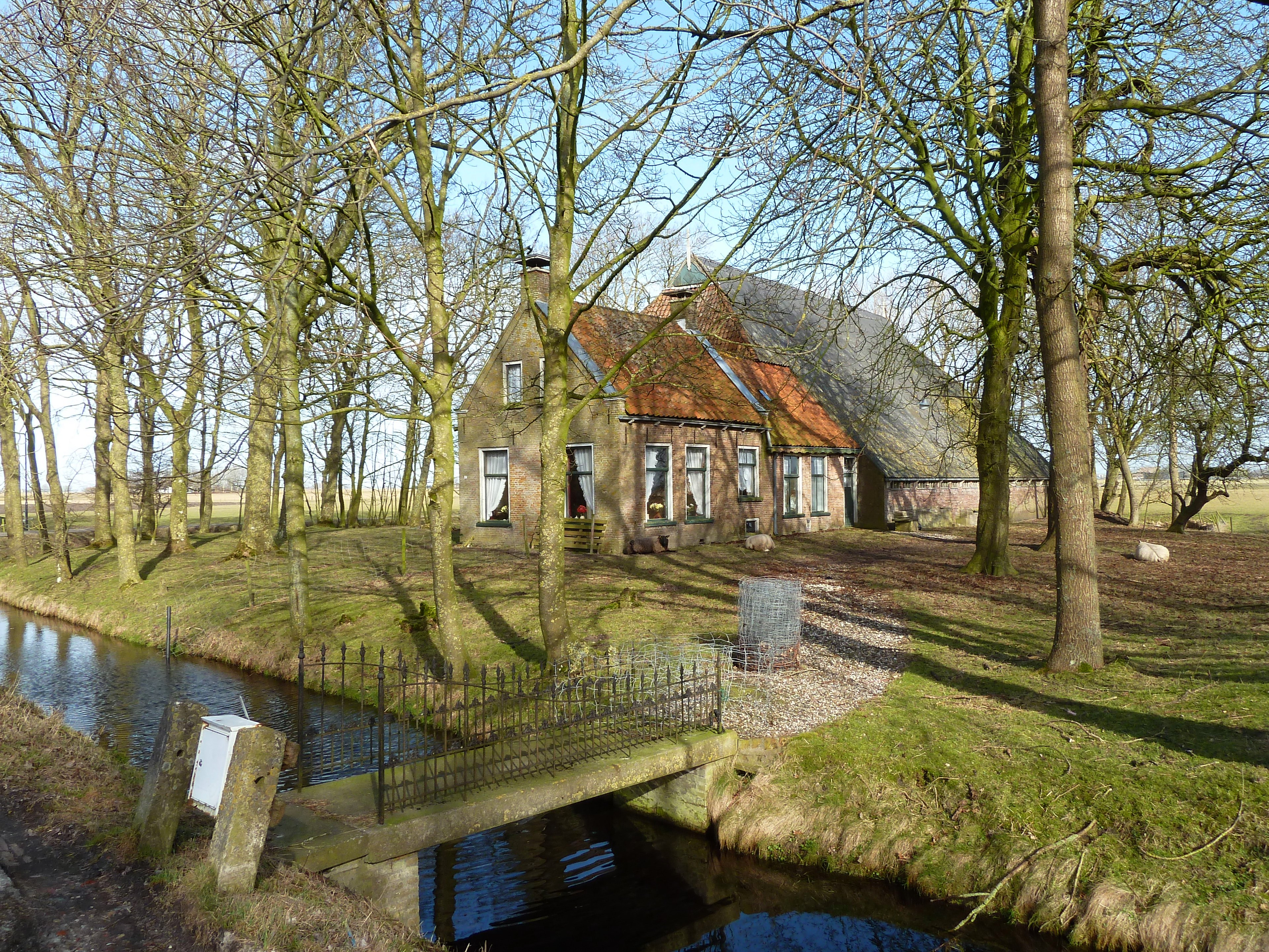
Farm in Aalsum

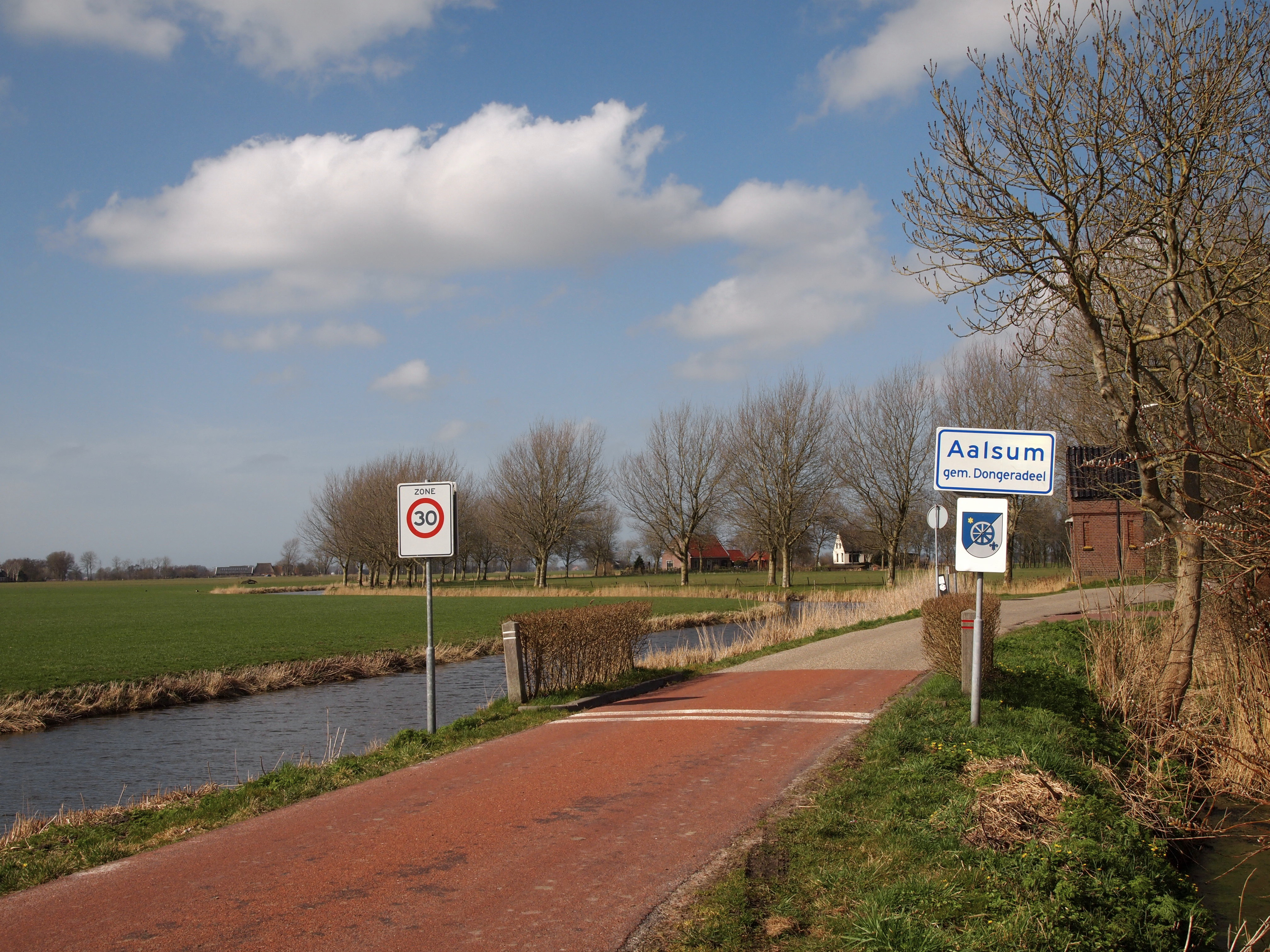
Welcome to Aalsum

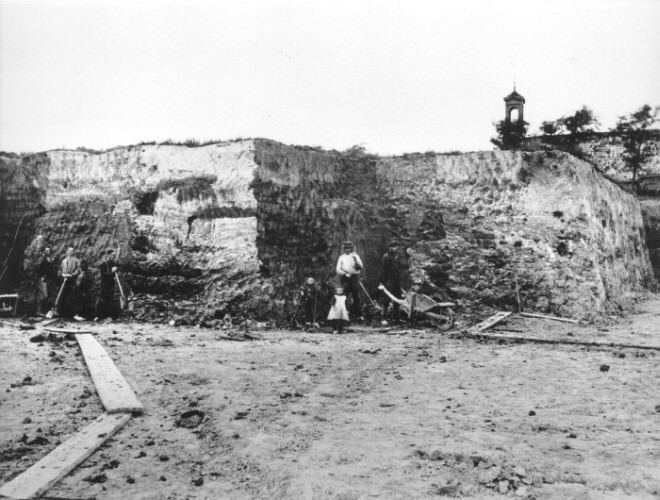
Excavation of the terp (c. 1884)

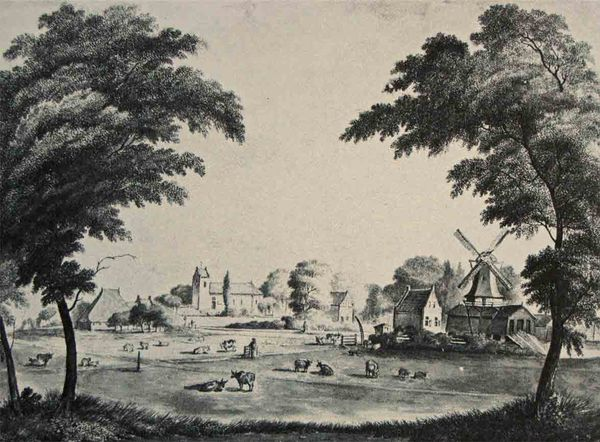
Drawing of Aalsum (early 19th century)
