= Musselkanaal =

- Town
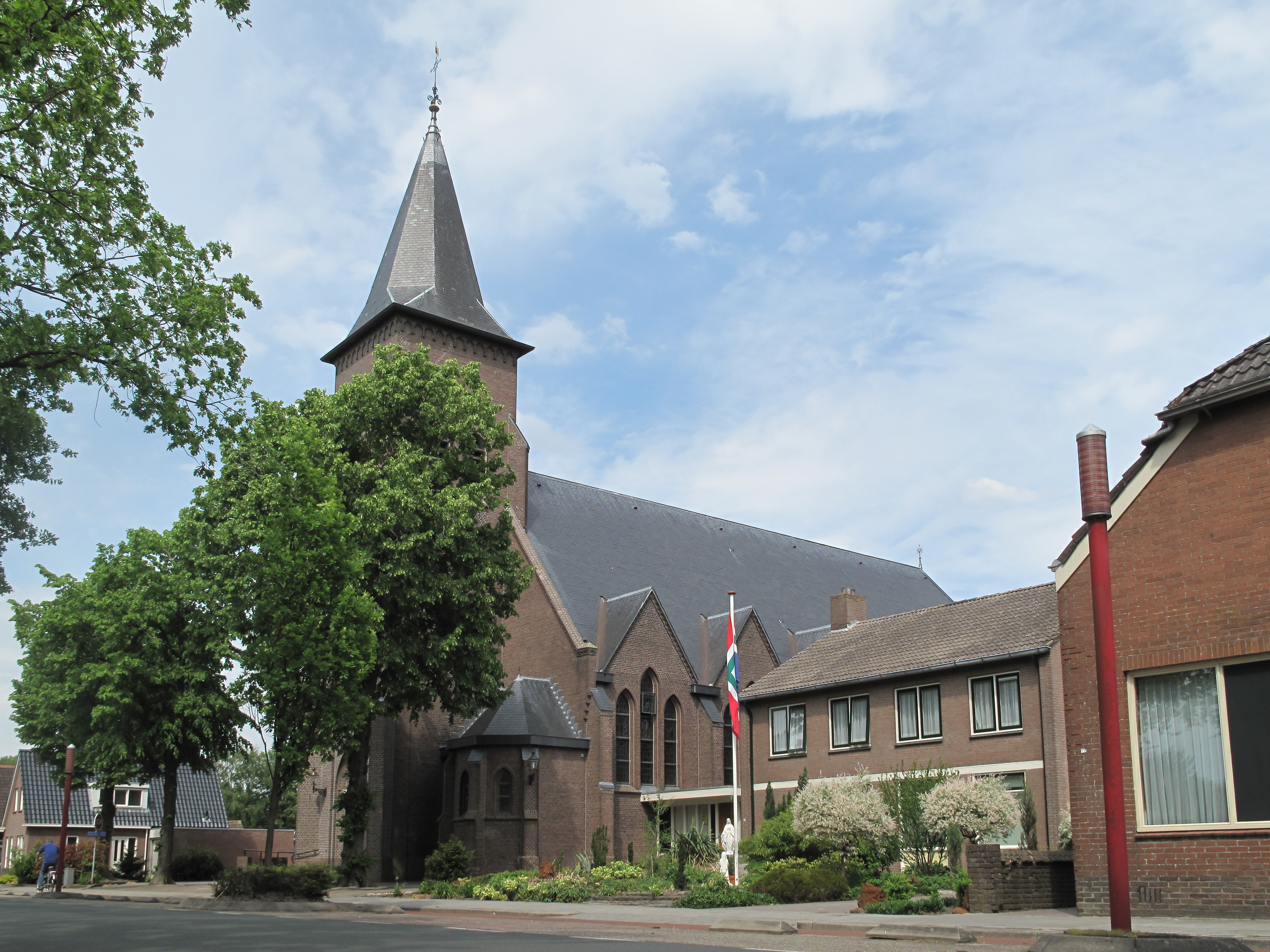
- Church in Musselkanaal (2011)

- Location in the province of Groningen in the Netherlands Musselkanaal (Netherlands)
- Coordinates: 52.9293°N 7.0192°E
- Country: Netherlands
- Province: Groningen
- Municipality: Stadskanaal

Area
  - Total: 11.56 km^{2} (4.46 sq mi)
- Elevation: 10 m (33 ft)

Population (2021)
  - Total: 7,130
  - Density: 617/km^{2} (1,600/sq mi)
- Postal code: 9581
- Area code: 0599

Musselkanaal (also: Stads-Musselkanaal; Gronings: Muzzelknoal) is a town in the Dutch province of Groningen. It is located in the municipality of Stadskanaal and is directly southeast from the center of Stadskanaal on the linear development (lintdorp) and the canal, which flows on to Ter Apel and Barnflair. Musselkanaal was established by the city of Groningen in the 1840s to exploit the peat. It used to be part of the municipality of Onstwedde, but was merged into Stadskanaal in 1968.

== History ==
The Bourtange moor was located in the south-east of Groningen. It was a raised bog with few inhabitants. Around 1600, corporations started to exploit the peat. In 1635, the city of Groningen took control, and established the Groninger Peat Colonies, as a colony. The colony had advanced to Stadskanaal where it ended due to a border conflict with the province of Drenthe. In 1615, the border had been defined by the Semslinie, and the village and monastery of Ter Apel was assigned to Drenthe. In 1817, the line was modified with the so-called Koningsraai which assigned Ter Apel to Groningen.

In 1819, Groningen started extending the Stadskanaal in a south-eastern direction close to the provincial border. The canal was initially called Stads-Musselkanaal and contains two bends due to the Koningsraai. In 1850, the canal was renamed Musselkanaal. The village was named after the canal. Musselkanaal is a linear settlement, and contains five side-canals along which houses were built. There is a large park and sports ground in the south of the town. The Horstenerbos, a forest area, is located on the northern side.

The peat extraction resulted in an immigration from neighbouring Germany. Many of the immigrants were Catholics, and in 1843, a Catholic church was built in Zandberg. In 1903, a parish was established in Musselkanaal. It used to have a railway line and train station. In 1955, the line closed for passengers, and for goods in 1990. In 1992, the section Veendam–Stadskanaal–Musselkanaal was bought by STAR which operates a museum line with steam trains. The town used to be part of the municipality of Onstwedde, but was merged into Stadskanaal in 1968.

== Notable people ==
- Jannes Munneke (born 1949), a rower who competed at the 1972 Summer Olympics
- Sienie Strikwerda (1921–2013), educator, feminist and anti–nuclear weapons activist

== Gallery ==
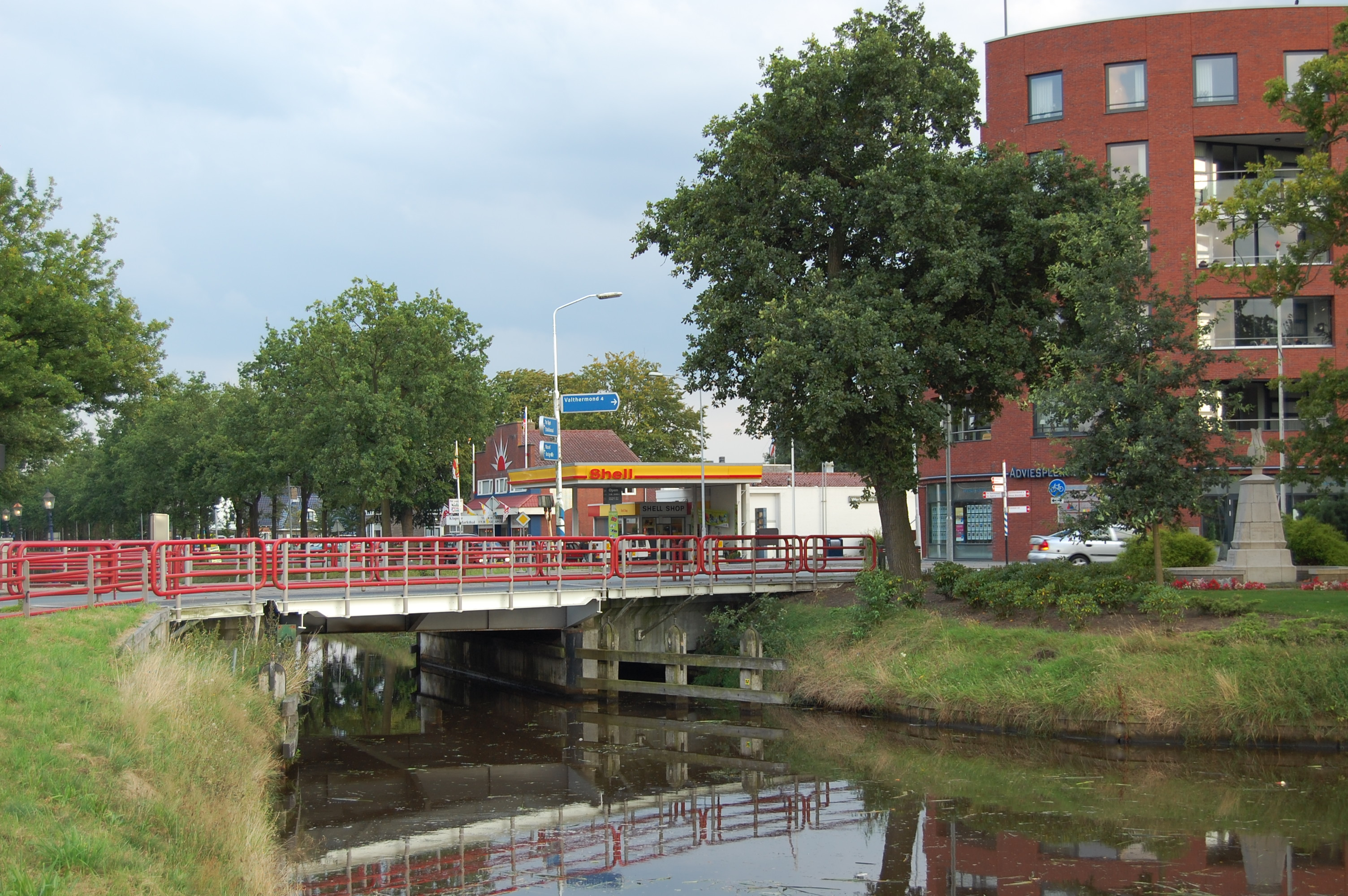
De IJzeren Klap (bridge)

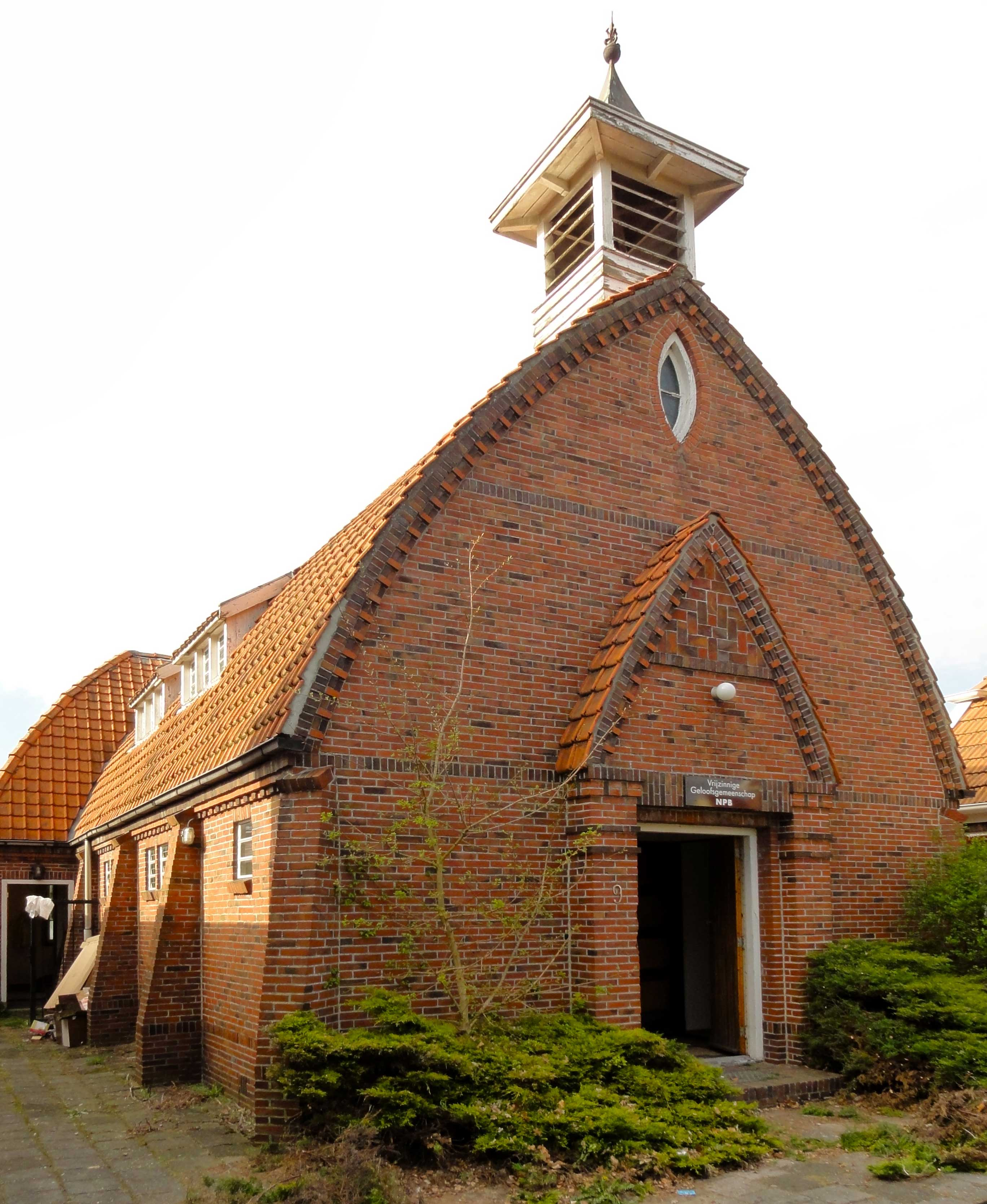
Protestant church

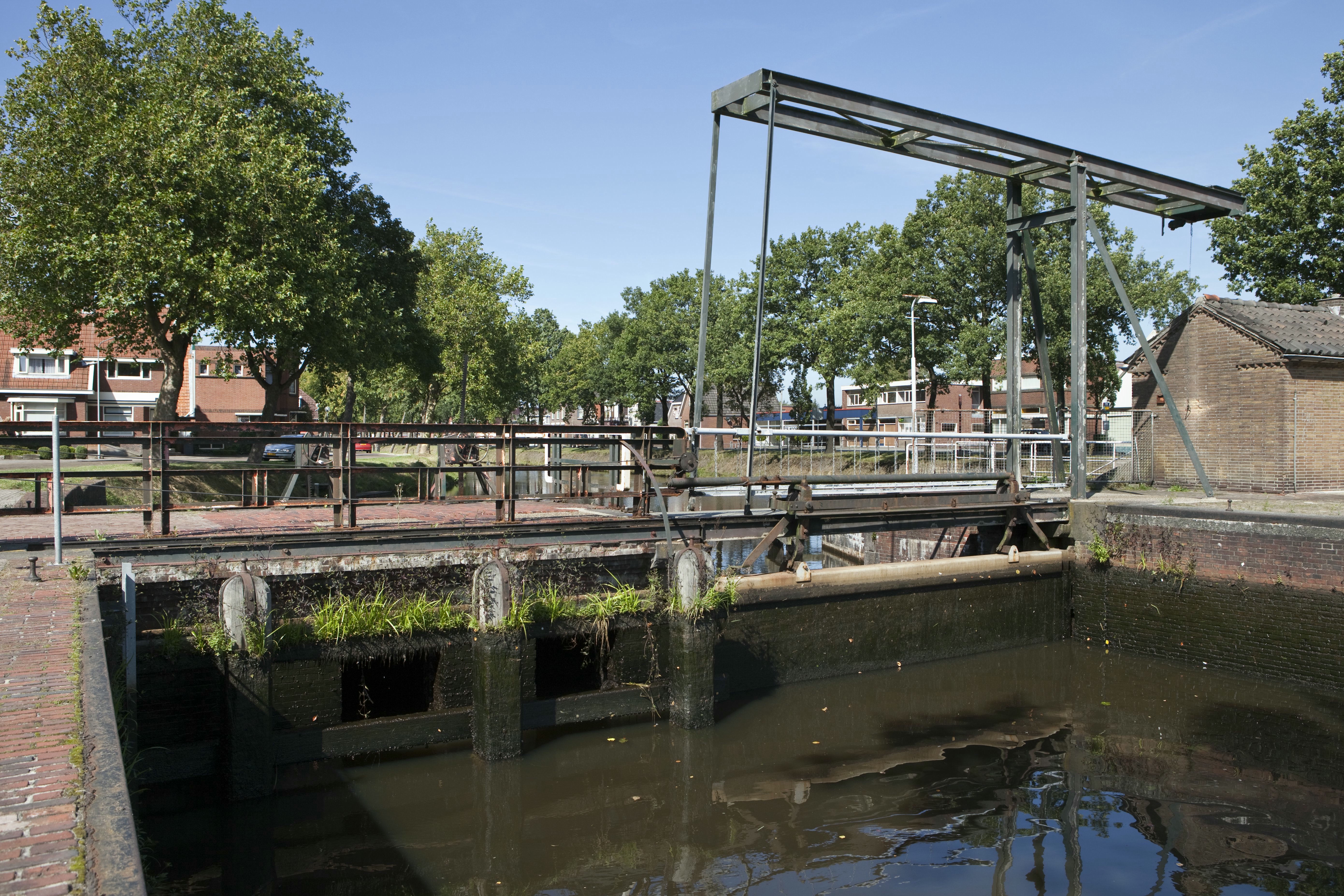
The fifth lock

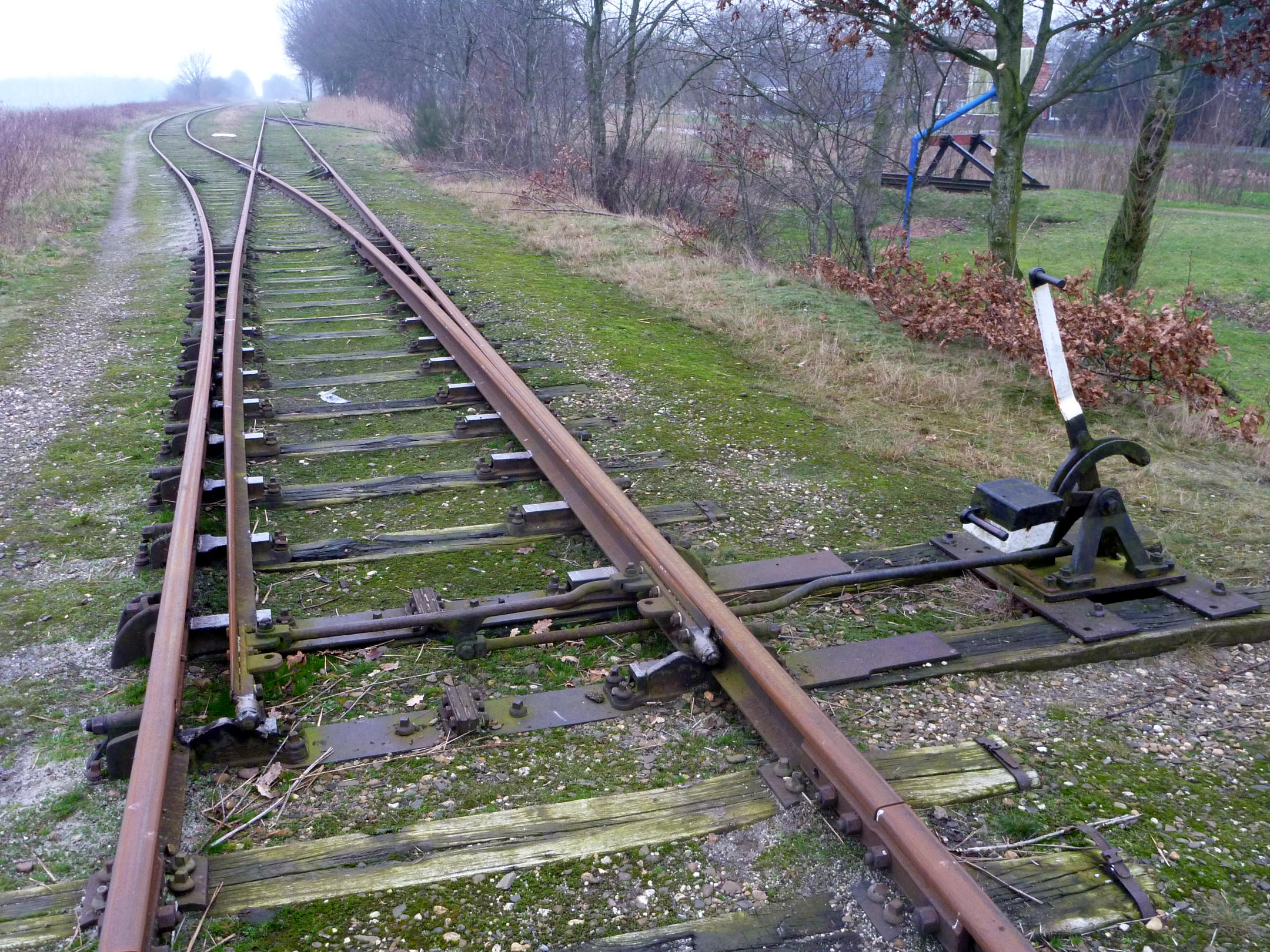
Unused railway line (2014)
