= World Para Athletics European Championships =

Event organized by World Para Athletics

- Sport: Athletics
- Founded: 2003
- Continent: European (IPC)

The World Para Athletics European Championships (European Para Athletics Championships), known prior to 2018 as the IPC Athletics European Championships is an event organized by World Para Athletics, the international athletics federation established under the International Paralympic Committee (IPC) in 2016. Athletes with a physical disability compete, and there is also a specific category for athletes with an intellectual disability. Organised biennially, the original Games ran from 2003 to 2005 as an Open Championship but the event was frozen in 2005, but returned in 2012 in Stadskanaal, Netherlands.

The first IPC Athletics European Championships was held in Assen, Netherlands in 2003 as an Open Championship. The most recent edition of the event was held in Bydgoszcz, Poland in June 2021

== Championships ==
Edition	Year	City	Country	Date	Venue	No. of Events	No. of Athletes	Best Nation
IPC Athletics European Championships
1	2003	Assen	Netherlands	15 – 21 Jun	Stadsbroek sports park	215	700	Germany
2	2005	Espoo	Finland	22 – 27 August	Leppävaara stadium	+150	750	United Kingdom
3	2012	Stadskanaal	Netherlands	24 – 28 June	Stadskanaal Stadium	144	550	Russia
4	2014	Swansea	United Kingdom	18 – 23 August	Swansea University Stadium	193	550	Russia
5	2016	Grosseto	Italy	10 – 16 June	Stadio Olimpico Carlo Zecchini	171	700	Russia
World Para Athletics European Championships
6	2018	Berlin	Germany	20 – 26 August	Friedrich-Ludwig-Jahn-Sportpark	182	600	Poland
7	2021	Bydgoszcz	Poland	1 – 5 June	Zdzisław Krzyszkowiak Stadium	157	670	Russia

Host cities of the games through 2016

== Classification ==
- F = field athletes.
- T = track athletes.
- P = pentathlon.
- 11-13 – visually impaired, 11 and 12 compete with a sighted guide.
- 20 – intellectual disability.
- 31-38 – cerebral palsy or other conditions that affect muscle co-ordination and control. Athletes in class 31-34 compete in a seated position; athletes in class 35-38 compete standing.
- 41-46 – amputation, les autres.
- 51-58 – wheelchair athletes.

== Medal table ==
As of 2021.

Rank	Nation	Gold	Silver	Bronze	Total
1	Russia	171	154	103	428
2	Great Britain	115	84	98	297
3	Poland	104	95	91	290
4	Ukraine	104	80	63	247
5	Germany	92	124	70	286
6	France	70	59	56	185
7	Spain	52	64	69	185
8	Switzerland	48	29	44	121
9	Finland	39	15	16	70
10	Netherlands	34	45	27	106
11	Greece	30	40	41	111
12	Czech Republic	28	34	47	109
13	Belarus	26	33	25	84
14	Turkey	22	22	23	67
15	Ireland	22	14	18	54
16	Portugal	20	43	30	93
17	Italy	20	28	38	86
18	Lithuania	20	19	14	53
19	Bulgaria	18	19	24	61
20	Austria	15	22	13	50
21	Croatia	15	14	22	51
22	Sweden	14	16	12	42
23	Serbia	14	13	17	44
24	Latvia	12	6	16	34
25	Denmark	11	16	8	35
26	Azerbaijan	10	8	7	25
27	Slovakia	6	12	11	29
28	Belgium	6	9	9	24
29	Iceland	5	4	7	16
30	Hungary	4	5	10	19
31	Norway	3	9	4	16
32	Cyprus	2	4	0	6
33	Slovenia	2	2	6	10
34	Montenegro	1	3	1	5
35	Romania	1	0	2	3
36	Estonia	1	0	0	1
37	Luxembourg	0	5	1	6
38	Serbia and Montenegro	0	2	2	4
39	Yugoslavia	0	1	1	2
40	Moldova	0	1	0	1
41	Israel	0	0	5	5
42	Bosnia and Herzegovina	0	0	1	1
Totals (42 entries)		1,157	1,153	1,052	3,362

* In the 2005 IPC Athletics European Championships, Australia, Brazil, Canada, China, Iran, Japan, Jordan, Saudi Arabia and United Arab Emirates were all guests in the championships and have won medals for their country respectively.

== See also ==
- World Para Athletics Championships
- European Athletics Championships
