= Strikwerda =

Strikwerda is a surname. Notable people with the surname include:

- Carl J. Strikwerda (born 1952), American historian
- Hans Strikwerda (born 1952), Dutch organizational theorist
- Rein Strikwerda (1930–2006), Dutch orthopedic surgeon
- Sienie Strikwerda (1921–2013), Dutch educator, feminist and anti–nuclear weapons activist
