= Vledderveen, Groningen =

Vledderveen
- Village
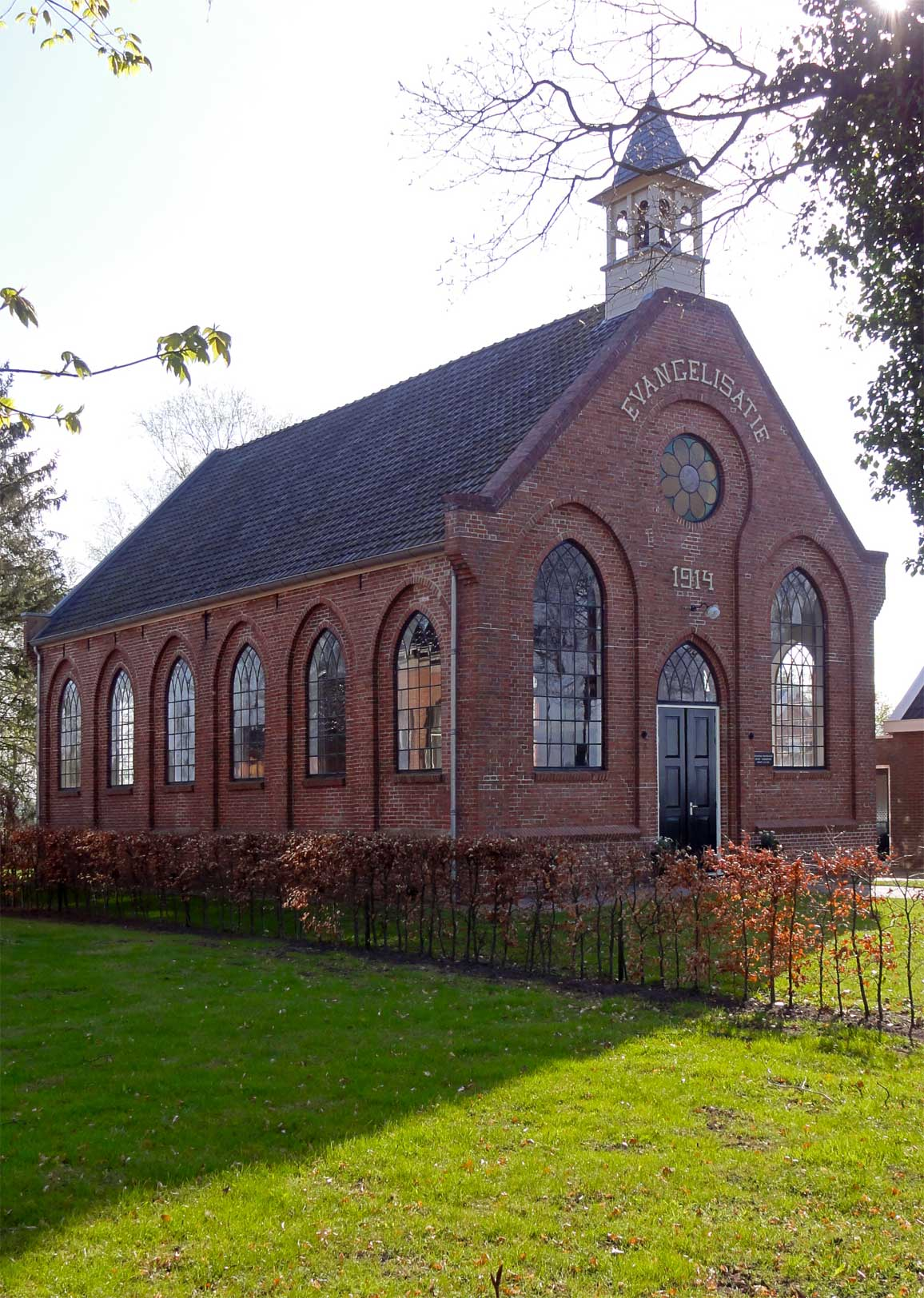
- Church in 2010

- Location in the province of Groningen in the Netherlands Vledderveen (Netherlands)
- Coordinates: 52°59′10″N 7°0′28″E
- Country: Netherlands
- Province: Groningen
- Municipality: Stadskanaal
- Established: 1880

Area
  - Total: 2.84 km^{2} (1.10 sq mi)
- Elevation: 5 m (16 ft)

Population (2021)
  - Total: 295
  - Density: 104/km^{2} (269/sq mi)
- Postal code: 9585
- Area code: 0599

Vledderveen (also: Vledderbatten) is a village in the Dutch province of Groningen. It is located in the municipality of Stadskanaal, about 3 km east of the centre of that town.

Vledderveen was established on 21 June 1880 to cultivate the heath. It used by inhabited by shepherd Minne Kone, his dog and 2,000 sheep. It was originally called Vledderbatten. In 1903, a school opened in Vledderveen. It was closed in the late 20th century due to lack of students.

In 1961, Stadskanaal Airfield was built in Vledderveen. In 1969, a motocross club was established. The former landfill near the village was used as a track, however the neighbours complained about the noise. It was decided to build a motocross circuit next to the airfield.
