= Nieuw-Buinen =

- Village
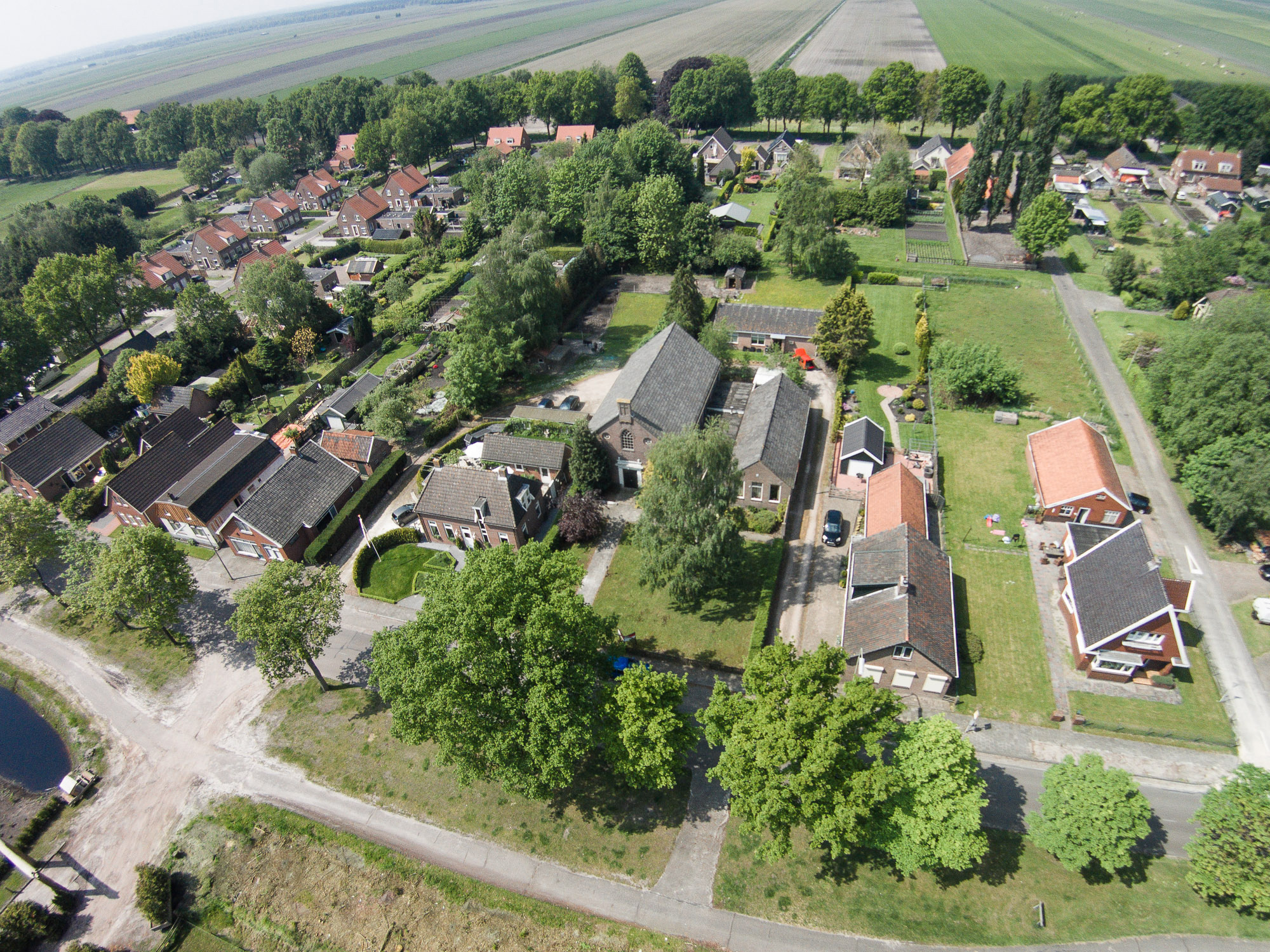
- Aerial view on Nieuw-Buinen

- Location of the village in the province of Drenthe Nieuw-Buinen (Netherlands)
- Coordinates: 52°58′N 6°57′E
- Country: Netherlands
- Province: Drenthe
- Municipality: Borger-Odoorn
- Established: 1823

Area
  - Total: 23.03 km^{2} (8.89 sq mi)
- Elevation: 8 m (26 ft)

Population (2021)
  - Total: 4,865
  - Density: 211.2/km^{2} (547.1/sq mi)
- Time zone: UTC+1 (CET)
  - Summer (DST): UTC+2 (CEST)
- Postal code: 9521
- Dialing code: 0599

Nieuw-Buinen is a village in the Dutch province of Drenthe. It is a part of the municipality of Borger-Odoorn, and lies about 21 kilometres (13 mi) north of Emmen.

The village was first mentioned in 1840 as Nieuw-Buinen. It is a peat excavation village which was founded in 1823. Nieuw (new) has been added to distinguish between Buinen. The double canal was dug from Stadskanaal to excavate the peat in the area. In 1838, a glass factory opened in Nieuw-Buinen and was followed by another glass factory in 1840. In 1899, a potato starch factory was added.

The glass industry played a big part in the development and growth of the village. Most of the skilled labourers were brought in from Germany. In 1936 and 1938 takeovers took place and both factories became part of the Vereenigde Glasfabrieken (United Glassworks), leading to the closure of one of the factories in 1938. In 1967 the second factory closed as a result of dwindling sales, with glass packaging being replaced by cardboard and plastics. In remembrance to the role the glassworks played, a statue, "de Glasblazer" ("the Glassblower"), was unveiled and placed on the Noorderdiep in 1974.

Nieuw-Buinen was home to 367 people in 1840. The Dutch Reformed church was built in 1853 in neoclassic style and has an open tower. It was extended in 1904. Villa Flora was built between 1877 and 1879 by the owner of the glass factory. It is named after a cast iron statue of Flora, the goddess of spring.

== Gallery ==
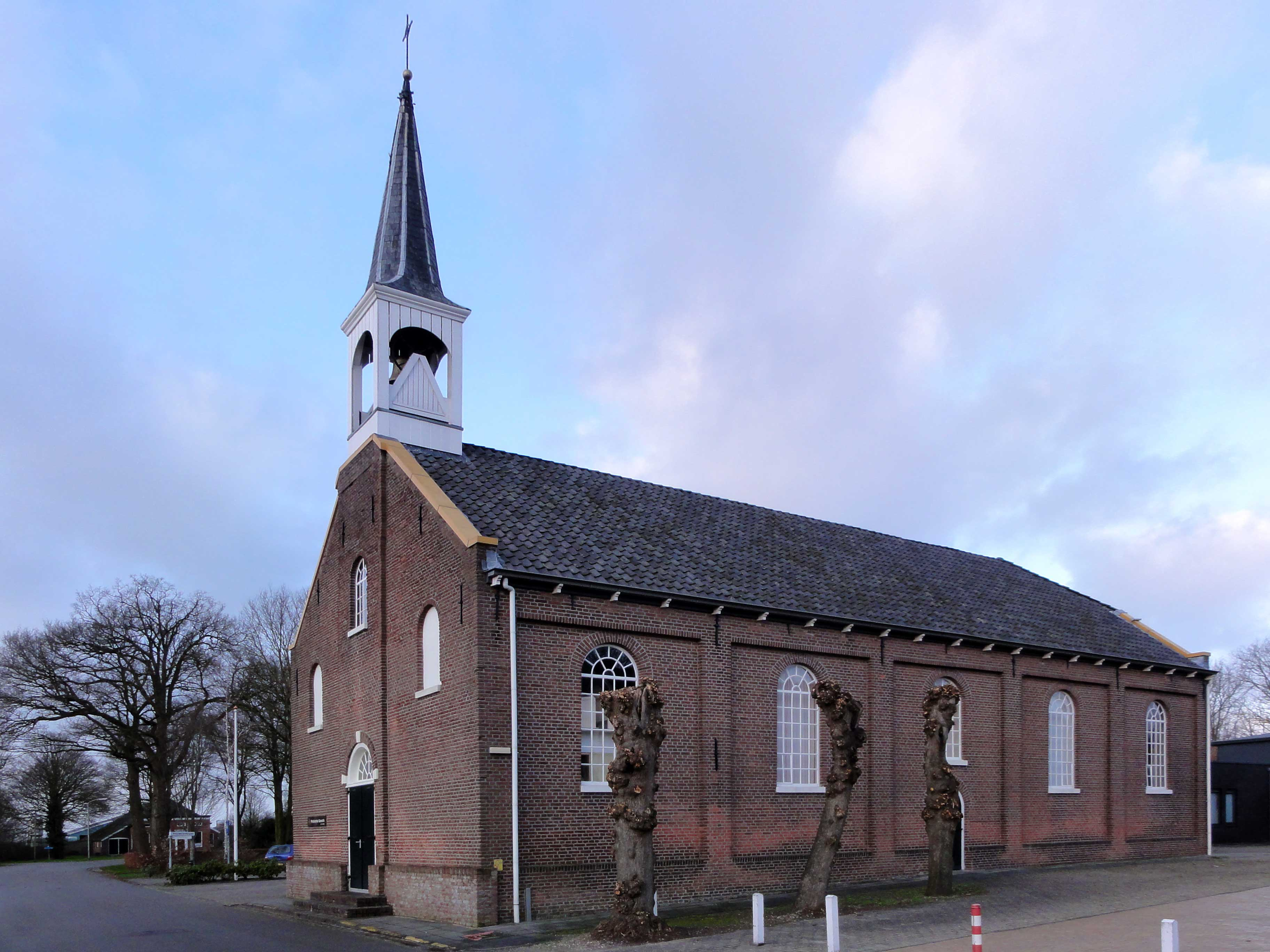
Dutch Reformed church

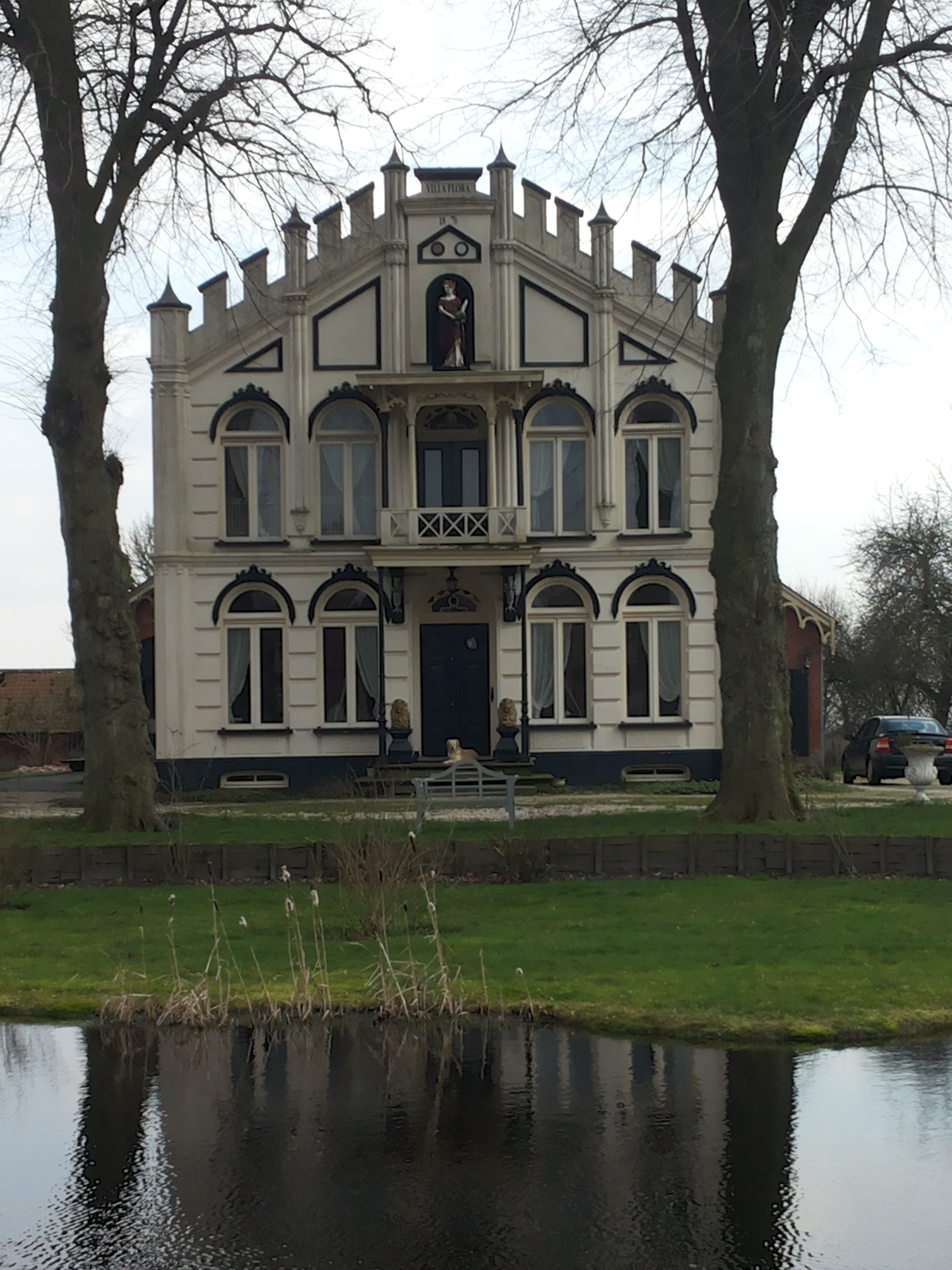
Villa Flora

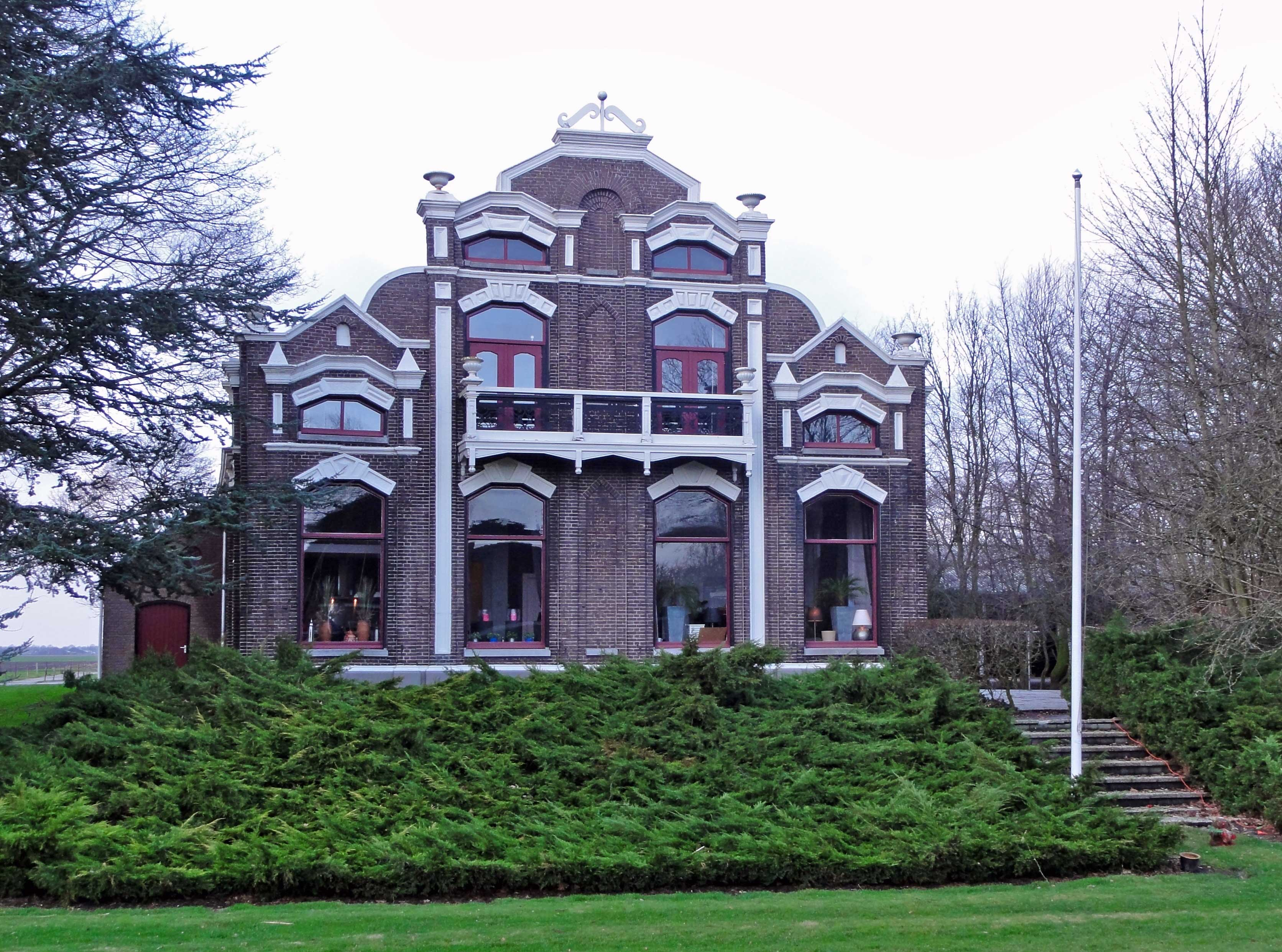
Villa in Nieuw-Buinen

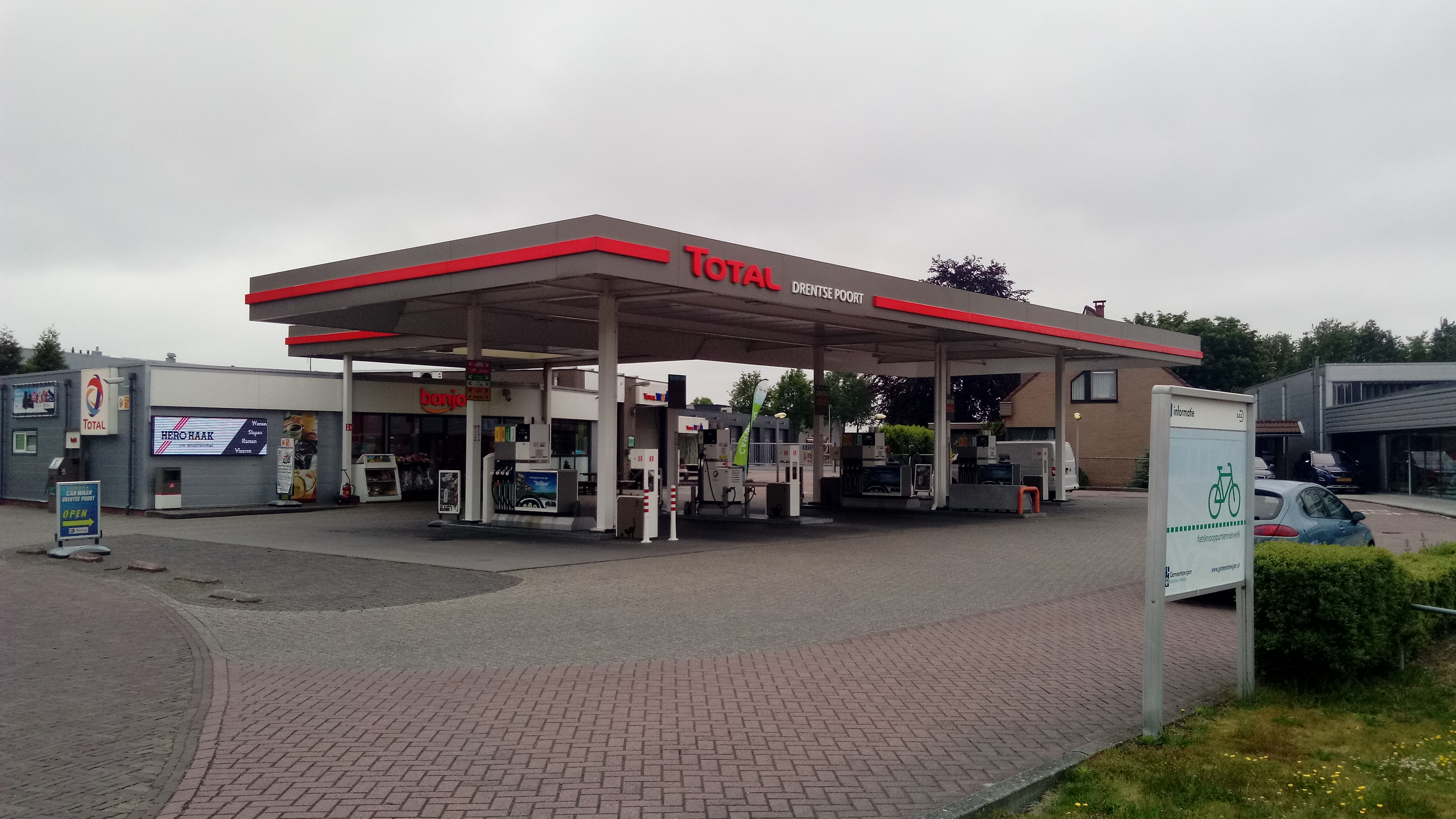
Gas station in Nieuw-Buinen

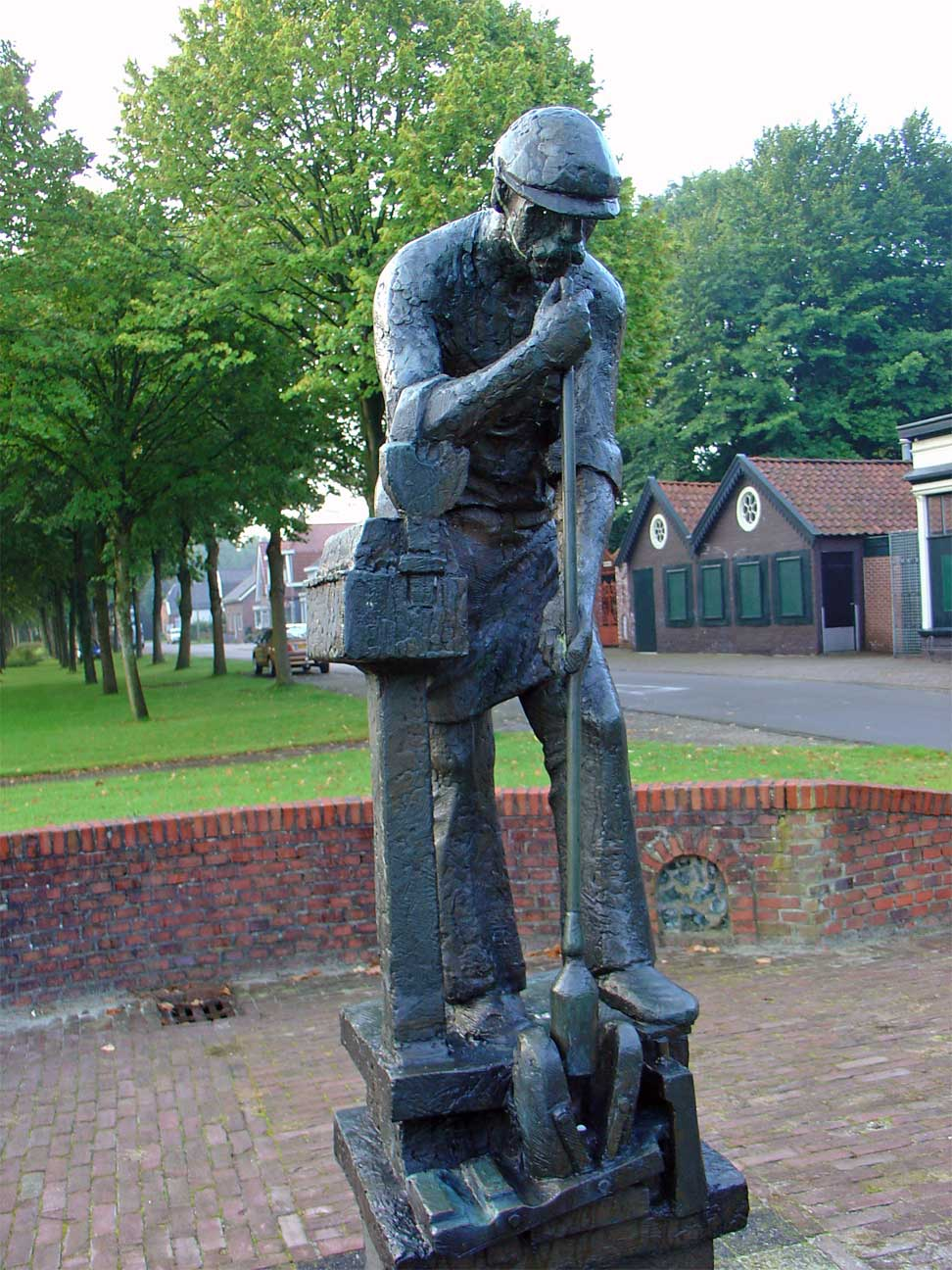
Statue "de Glasblazer"
