= Stadskanaal =

- Town and Municipality
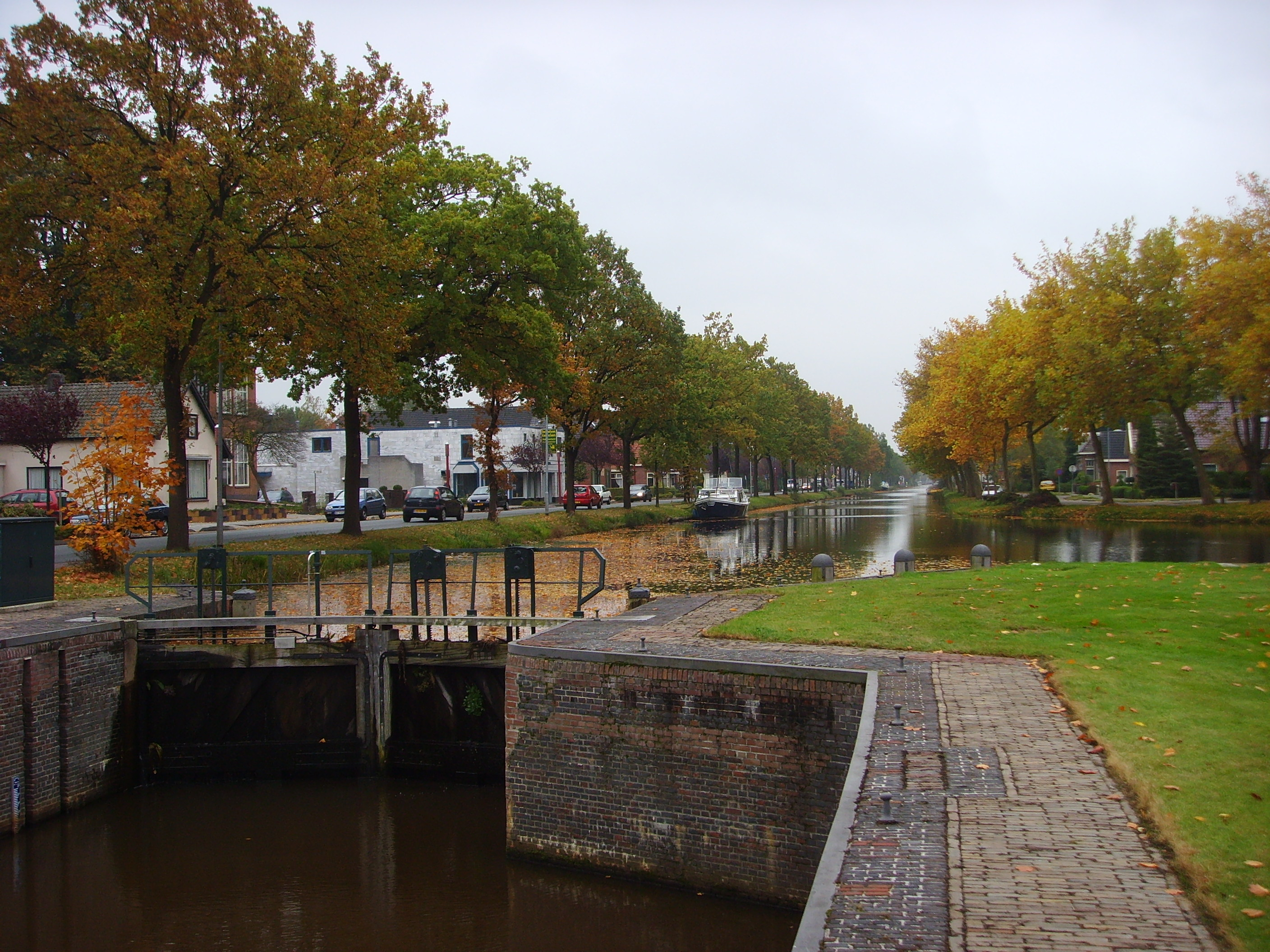
- The canal in Stadskanaal

- Flag Coat of arms

- Location in Groningen
- Coordinates: 52°59′N 6°57′E
- Country: Netherlands
- Province: Groningen

Government
  - Body: Municipal council
  - Mayor: Klaas Sloots (GL)

Area
  - Total: 119.94 km^{2} (46.31 sq mi)
  - Land: 117.64 km^{2} (45.42 sq mi)
  - Water: 2.30 km^{2} (0.89 sq mi)
- Elevation: 6 m (20 ft)

Population (January 2026)
  - Total: 32,110
  - Density: 273/km^{2} (710/sq mi)
- Time zone: UTC+1 (CET)
  - Summer (DST): UTC+2 (CEST)
- Postcode: 9500–9509, 9580–9599, 9660–9661
- Area code: 0599
- Website: www.stadskanaal.nl

Stadskanaal (Dutch pronunciation: [ˌstɑtskaːˈnaːl]) is a town and municipality in the province of Groningen in the northeast of the Netherlands. It was named after the canal Stadskanaal which literally means "City Canal" and it is a linear village. In the Gronings dialect the town is called "Knoal" and the locals are called "Knoalsters".

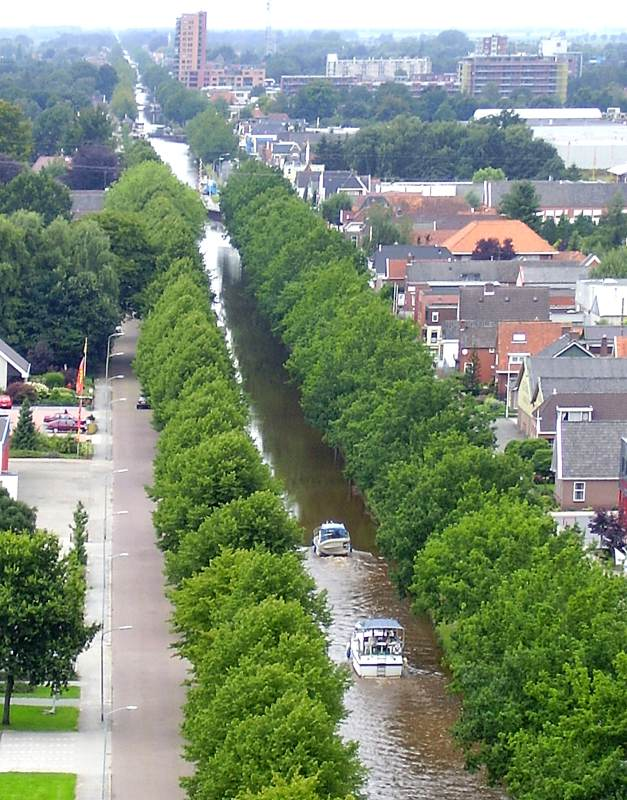
Stadskanaal and its canal

From 1800 until 1900 this area was ideal for its peat mining, and so the canal came to ship all the peat to Groningen, the capital of the province. With industrialization, many of Stadskanaal's peat colony features, as well as many of its characteristic shophouses, were lost. The town now has 19,060 inhabitants (2023), making it one of the largest towns in the province. Together with Nieuw-Buinen, located across the provincial Drenthe border (the straight-line Semslinie), it forms a double core with just under 24,000 inhabitants. The Stadskanaal municipality overall has a population of 32,715.

The municipality of Stadskanaal was created on 1 January 1969, by merging the former municipality of Onstwedde with part of the former municipality of Wildervank.

== Geography ==
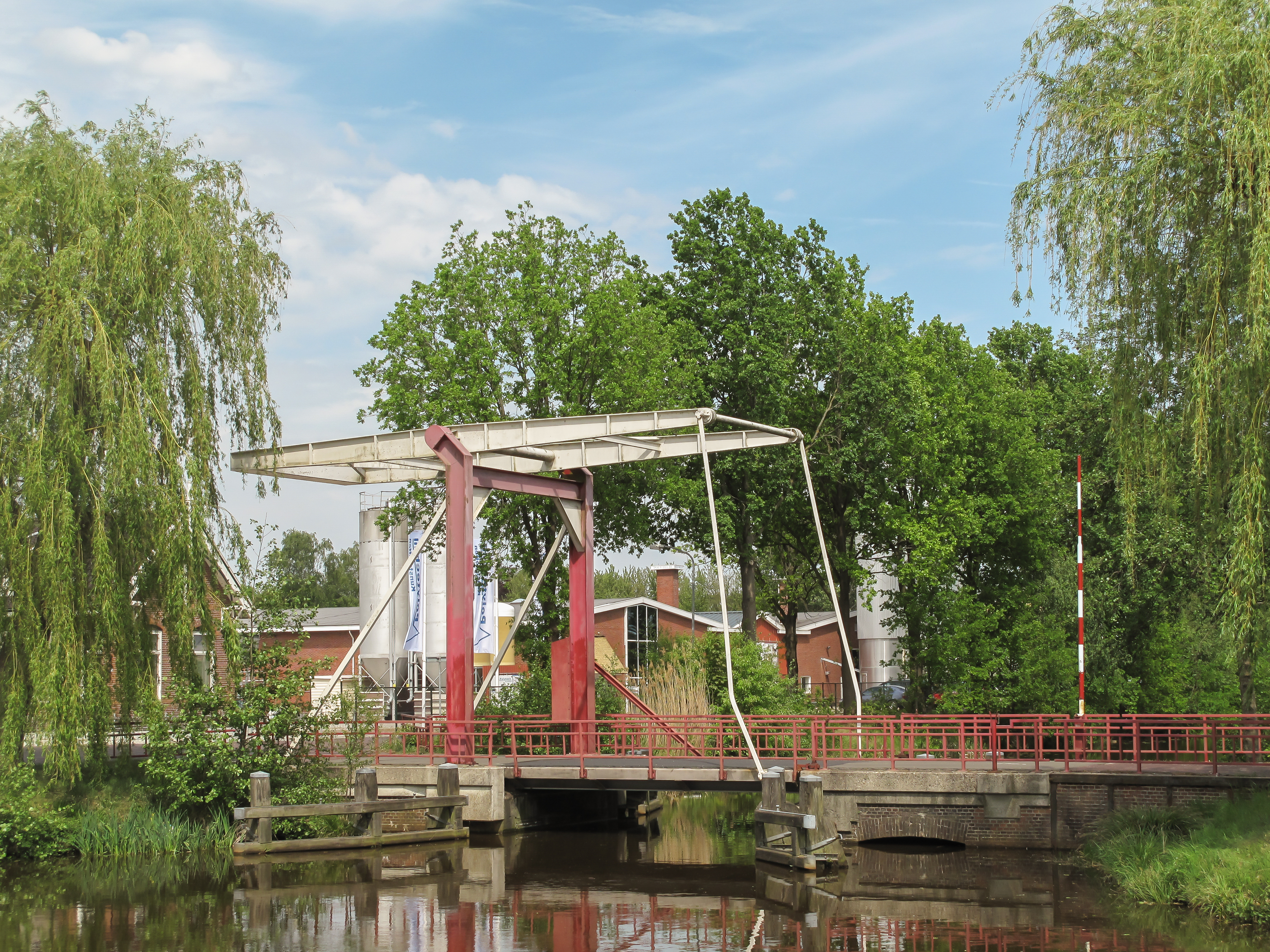
Musselkanaal drawbridge

Stadskanaal is one of the centers of the canal region; the villages and also the surrounding areas that stretch from Stadskanaal via Musselkanaal and Ter Apelkanaal to Barnflair on the German border. A significant portion of Stadskanaal's urban area is situated as a nearly 10-kilometer-long linear settlement along the canal of the same name. This village runs along the Stadskanaal canal from the municipality of Veendam to the municipality of Westerwolde (near Musselkanaal) for a distance of 16 kilometers. Residential areas lie on both sides, but most of the development is located on the north side of the canal.

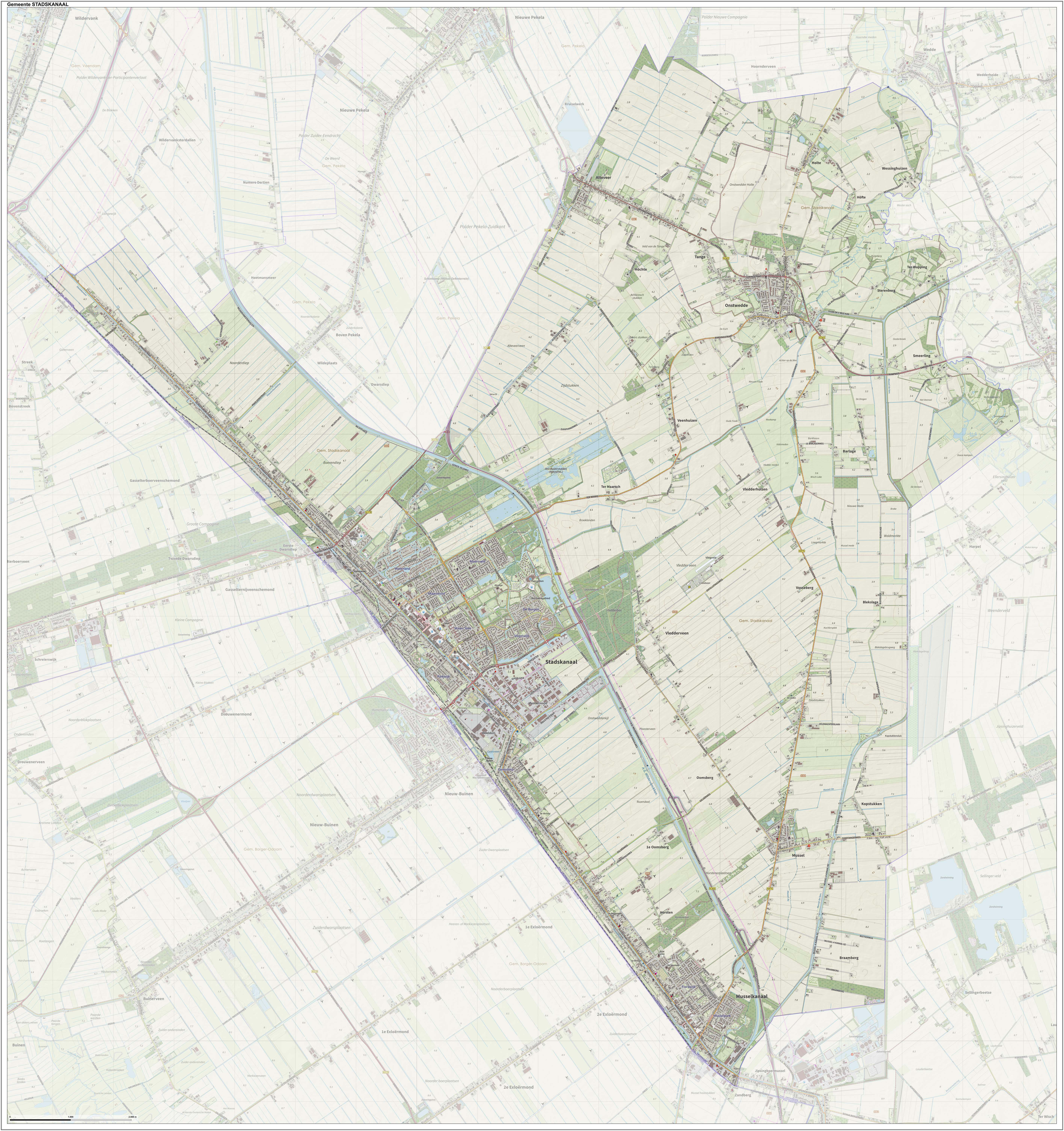
2014 map of the municipality

The population centres in the municipality are:

- Alteveer
- Barlage
- Blekslage
- Braamberg
- Ceresdorp
- Höchte
- Holte
- Horsten
- Kopstukken
- Mussel
- Musselkanaal
- Onstwedde
- Oomsberg
- Smeerling
- Stadskanaal
- Sterenborg
- Ter Maarsch
- Ter Wupping
- Veenhuizen
- Vledderhuizen
- Vledderveen
- Vosseberg
- Wessinghuizen

== History ==
=== Construction of the canal ===
The construction of the canal and the settlement were preceded by a secret decision of the city of Groningen in 1762, in which it was agreed to secretly begin peat extraction in the Drenthe area from the Groningen city lands. This required digging a canal system to the southeast to transport the peat from the Drenthe areas as well. The traditional founding date of the settlement is 11 February 1765, when the mayor and council of the city of Groningen decided to extend the Oosterdiep canal near Wildervank to Bareveld and, parallel to the Semslinie, to dig a new canal northeast to the southeast to allow peat extraction in the peat colonies. This became the Stadskanaal (City Canal).

The canal was dug by hand by about a hundred Groningen and German workers under the supervision of peat cutters such as Jan Uniken and the Van der Tuuk, Bosscher, Spier and Oosterwijk families. The Stadskanaal had a double canal system with a main canal and a rear canal. The rear canal was named Boerendiep, which was dug from 1783 onwards. However, the actual foundation of the town did not take place until 1787 when the first peat plots were allocated and the first twelve wooden houses of Stadskanaal were built. The first houses were deliberately built on the north side of the canal because the city of Groningen only wanted residents from Groningen, not from Drenthe. This attitude has resulted in far fewer houses on the south side of the canal to this day. Subsequently, the first wooden lock (the Springersverlaat) was built in the canal. The residents of this remote peat colony were considered very poor. The first residents were also considered anarchists who, when there was a dispute about wages, went on strike or even set fire to the peat bog, and crime was high.

Around 1800, a dispute arose between the people of Groningen and Drenthe over who should pay for connecting the Drenthe peatlands to the Stadskanaal. The people of Drenthe constructed outlets to the canal, but the city had them closed off again. After a visit by King William I in 1814, it was agreed that the people of Drenthe would contribute, and construction resumed. By 1815, the canal had reached the site of the later Stadskanaal water tower. The canal led to enormous growth in the town. Between 1818 and 1849, the population increased by 600 percent, resulting in the development of a linear village of primarily farms and houses on both sides of the main canal and on the north side of the Boerendiep canal. Many shops sprang up at these locations and the first places of worship.

=== Industry and rail ===
In 1856, the canal reached Ter Apel. The canal's further extension to Munnekemoer near the German border in 1865 increased traffic. This also caused the town center to shift from its original location east of Pekelderstraat further southeast, ending up in the area between Drouwenermond and Buinermond in the 1930s. The poor valley soils left behind after peat extraction were left unfertilized for a long time because the poor residents lacked the money to buy the expensive city soil. However, with the introduction of artificial fertilizer and the rise of the potato from around 1850 onward, the land was bought up by outside settlers and developed, particularly from the Boerendiep. From the second half of the 18th century, the potato led to the construction of several malt distilleries along the canal.

In 1861, Stadskanaal gained a rail connection with Veendam through the construction of a horse-drawn tram line by the Eerste Groninger Tramway-Maatschappij (First Groningen Tramway Company). In 1866, the potato starch factory "Stadskanaal" was founded by Willem Albert Scholten on the site of the former Smit & Bosscher malt distillery. By 1871, there were also five shipyards and a large number of forges in Stadskanaal. By 1910, the number of shipyards between Bareveld and the IJzeren Klap near Musselkanaal had risen to 16. Peat barges, coastal vessels, and seagoing vessels were built here.

It wasn't until around 1900—long after Hoogezand-Sappemeer and Veendam—that the first significant industry emerged near the town. In 1895, a horse-drawn tram line to Ter Apel was completed. In the 1900s, Stadskanaal was connected to the NOLS railway lines: in 1905, the town was connected to the Zwolle-Stadskanaal railway line, and in 1910 to the Stadskanaal-Zuidbroek railway line. In 1924, the Stadskanaal-Ter Apel Rijkgrens railway line of the S.T.A.R. (the national border railway) followed. This made Stadskanaal Station, completed in 1903, a major railway junction with more than 400 railway employees.

In 1910, the cooperative strawboard factory "Ons Belang" and the cooperative potato starch factory C.V. 'Ons Belang' were built, followed in 1914 by the potato starch factory "De Twee Provinciën" on the Stadskanaal, north of the Pekelderdiep canal near the Gele Klap. This latter factory was the largest in the Netherlands (12.5% of national production).

The factories generated significant employment and drove population growth. In the late 1920s, municipal architect Meinen designed the first expansion plan for the area between the Stadskanaal canal and the S.T.A.R. railway line between Buinermond and Drouwenermond in the Onstwedder section of Stadskanaal. This Parkwijk was developed starting in the 1930s and is centered around Stationslaan between the canal and the station. Villas were built on both sides of this road, near the station, and in Julianapark to the east. Private homes were built on the west side of Stationslaan, and on the east side of Julianapark, alongside many social housing units (such as along Oranjestraat), 't Hofje, with housing for the elderly. A secondary school (1919), an ice rink and an open-air swimming pool were also built in this district. Meanwhile, most of the railway lines disappeared again under pressure from the rise of road transport: In the 1950s, the remaining railway was only used for goods. The canal, which once carried 40,000 ships a year, also had to give way to road transport.

=== Philips and growth ===
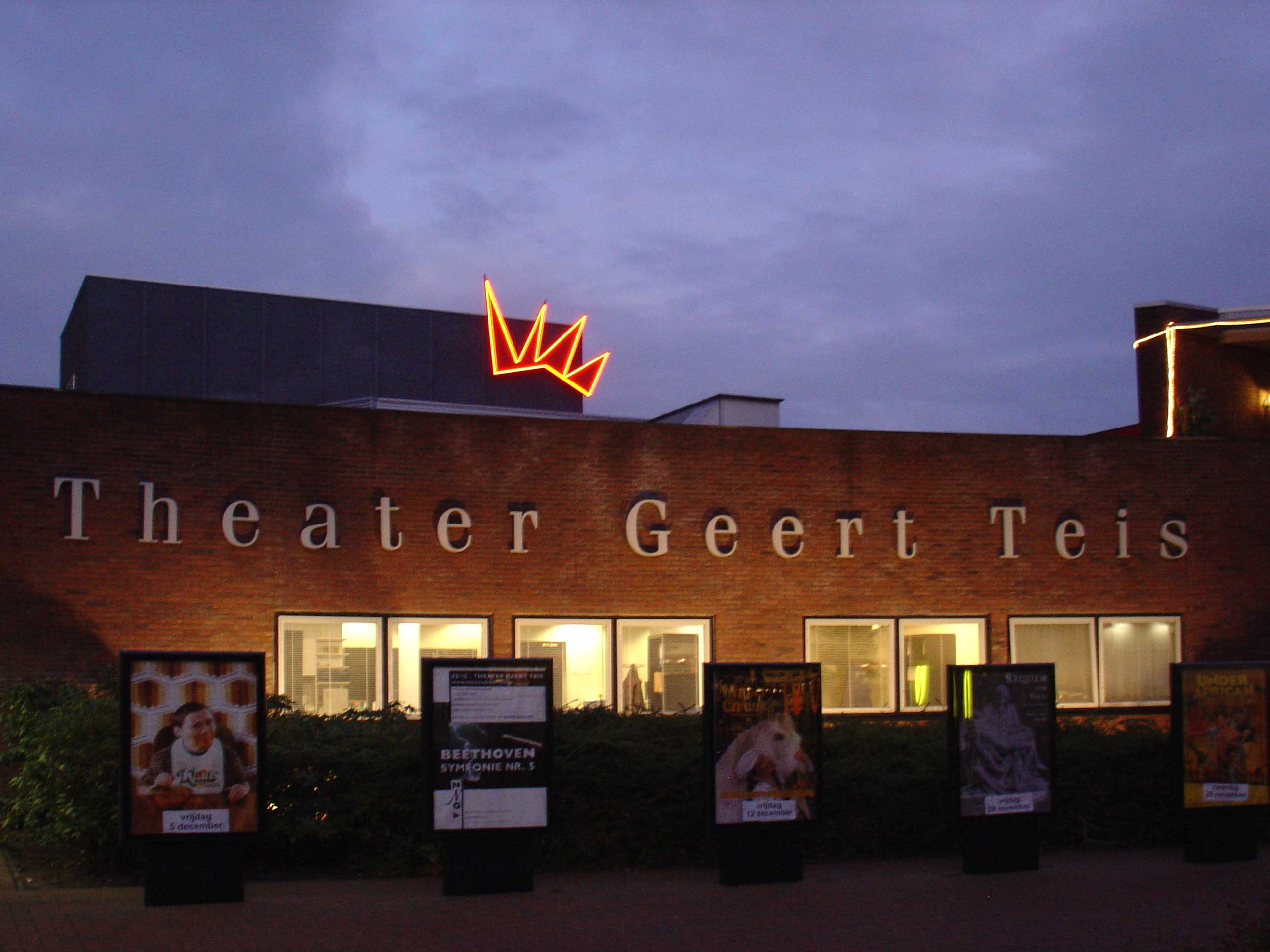
Theater Geert Teis

After World War II, Stadskanaal experienced strong growth. The main reason for this was the fact that the municipality of Onstwedde persuaded Philips in 1955 to build a semiconductor factory on the new Dideldom industrial estate. This arrival would instantly eliminate the high unemployment in the area. Initially, the municipal yards on Oude Markt were made available to Philips. By 1956, the number of employees had grown to 200, and a temporary production facility was built on Vledderweg. In 1960, the large factory site on Brugstraat and Electronicaweg was finally opened, already employing 1,000 people that year. Subsequently, a picture tube factory was also established, bringing the number of employees to over 3,000. A secondary technical school, a sports complex, and an airport (Stadskanaal Airfield near Vledderveen in 1961) were built for the Philips site. The existing plans for a theater (Theater Geert Teis in 1967) and library were also continued for this reason. Funding for the industrialization of Stadskanaal came partly from the national government.

New neighborhoods were developed for these workers, such as the Ter Maars plan, which saw the construction of the Maarsstee expansion district northeast of the former Boerendiep within four years, starting in 1959. More expansions districts were built though the 1960s and 1970s with some not complete until the 1990s. As a result, Stadskanaal grew into the second-largest municipality in the province, after the city of Groningen. With the new neighborhoods, the center of Stadskanaal shifted again, this time to the area between the original linear development along the canal and the expansion neighborhoods north of it. In 1970, a new shopping center with modern commercial buildings was built here.

=== Recent developments ===
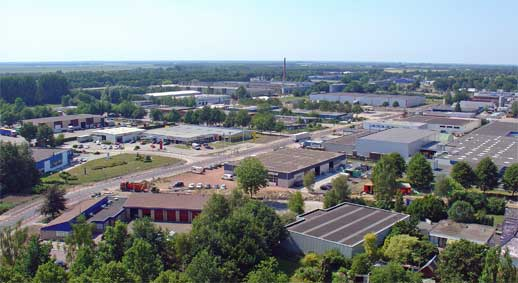
Dideldom industrial area, old Philips site is in the background

From 1978 onwards, Philips steadily reduced its operations in Stadskanaal, resulting in the loss of thousands of jobs in the late 1970s. From 2000 onwards, the remaining factory operations were transferred to other locations, including China. Operations ceased in 2006, and the former Philips site was subsequently redeveloped.

== Transport ==
=== Road ===
At the end of the nineteenth century, Stadskanaal was one of the busiest shipping routes; today, it is primarily used by pleasure craft. Stadskanaal is located on the N366, N374, and N378, while the N33 and N34 are just a few kilometers away.

=== Rail ===
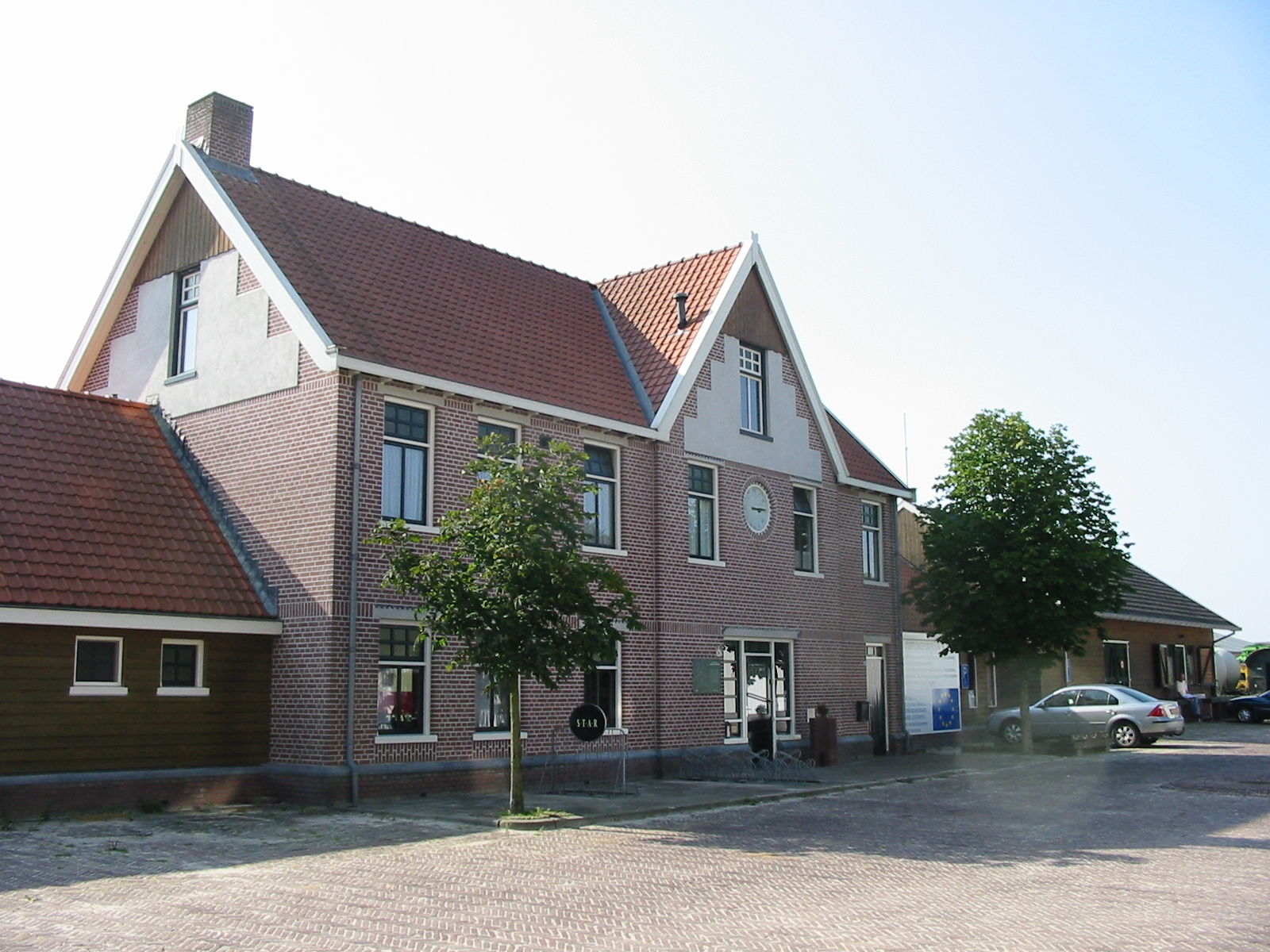
The old Stadskanaal central train station, now only in use as a museum railway

Currently, Stadskanaal does not have an active passenger train station.

Stadskanaal received its first rail connection in 1881 when the Eerste Groninger Tramway-Maatschappij (EGTM) company extended its horse-drawn tram line from Zuidbroek via Veendam to Wildervank. This line was extended further south to Valthermond in 1894. In 1895, it was extended to Ter Apel. (see Stadskanaal–Zuidbroek railway).

In 1905, the Noordoosterlocaalspoorweg-Maatschappij (NOLS) opened the Assen–Stadskanaal line. It was designed by architect Eduard Cuypers. Later that year, this company opened the Coevorden–Gasselternijveen section of the line to Zwolle, where trains continued to Stadskanaal. In 1910, the line between Stadskanaal and Zuidbroek, which continued to Delfzijl, was opened. The EGTM horse-drawn tram line encountered major problems after the opening of these railway lines, and the section between Zuidbroek and Stadskanaal was closed in 1914. The section between Stadskanaal and Ter Apel remained in operation until 1923.

The Groningsch-Drentsche Spoorwegmaatschappij Stadskanaal-Ter Apel-Rijksgrens (STAR) opened its line to Ter Apel in 1924 with the aim of crossing the border, but this never materialized. Passenger services on this line were discontinued in 1935. This line began at Stadskanaal station, and the town still had a stop on this line, the Stadskanaal Oost stop.

In 1938, the line between Stadskanaal and Emmen was closed. The same fate awaited the line between Stadskanaal and Assen in 1947. Passenger services between Zuidbroek and Stadskanaal were discontinued in 1953, and freight services between Musselkanaal, Stadskanaal, and Veendam were discontinued in 1990. The threatened demolition of this line was averted by the Stadskanaal Rail Foundation (STAR), which turned the line into a museum railway and began operating steam trains in 1994. There are now plans to reopen the Stadskanaal–Zuidbroek railway for passengers in the future and rebuilt the line to Emmen as part of the Nedersaksenlijn (Lower Saxony Line) project that will connect the Groningen region to Twente (via Hoogezand-Sappemeer, Veendam, Stadskanaal, Ter Apel, Emmen, Coevorden and Hardenberg.

== Religion ==
The first church built in Stadskanaal was the Reformed (NHK), neoclassical Semsstraat Church, which was decided upon in 1821 and opened in 1830. In 1944, with the Liberation, the first Reformed congregation (Liberated) was established.

In 1860, the synagogue of Stadskanaal was built after several years of opposition. During World War II, most Jews were deported and murdered by the Germans. Only a few Jews survived the war. The synagogue was demolished in 1964.

In 1848, a Catholic church was built at Poststraat 38. However, this was demolished again in 1953, after which the current three-aisled Catholic Church of Our Lady of the Assumption was completed in 1955 with a heavy, wide tower designed by Jan van Dongen jr.

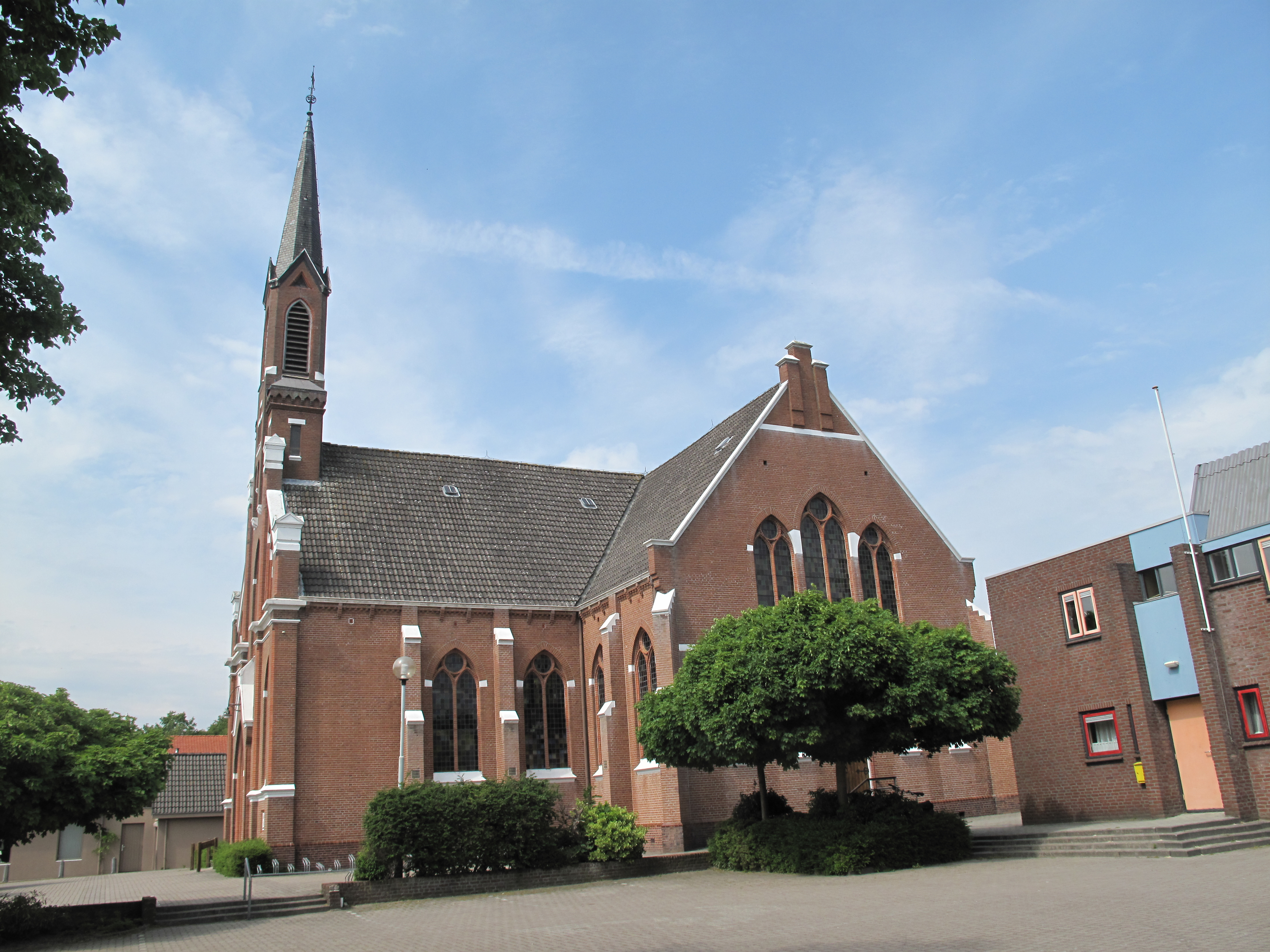
Stadskanaal, church: de Poststraatkerk

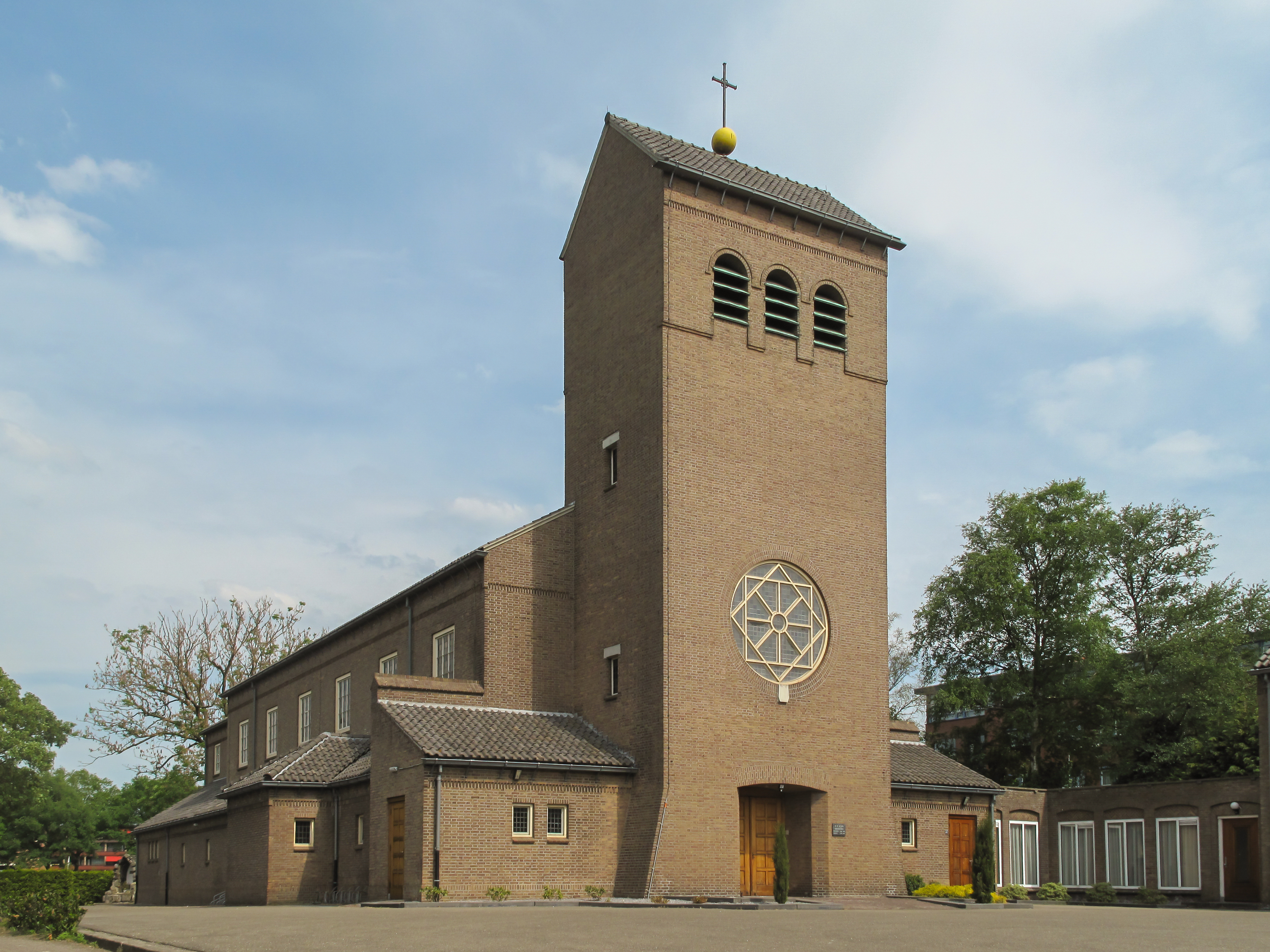
Stadskanaal, catholic church

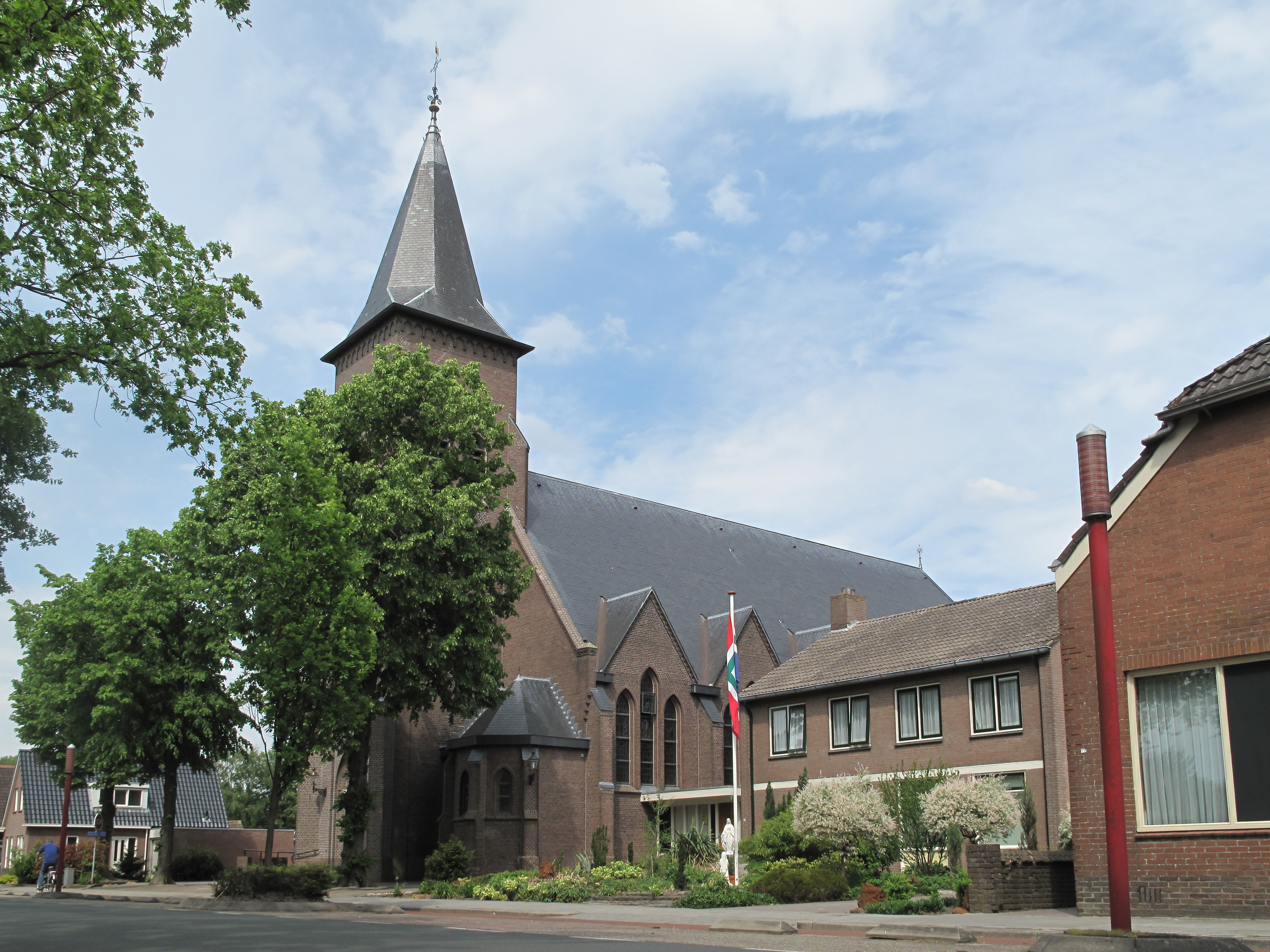
Musselkanaal, church

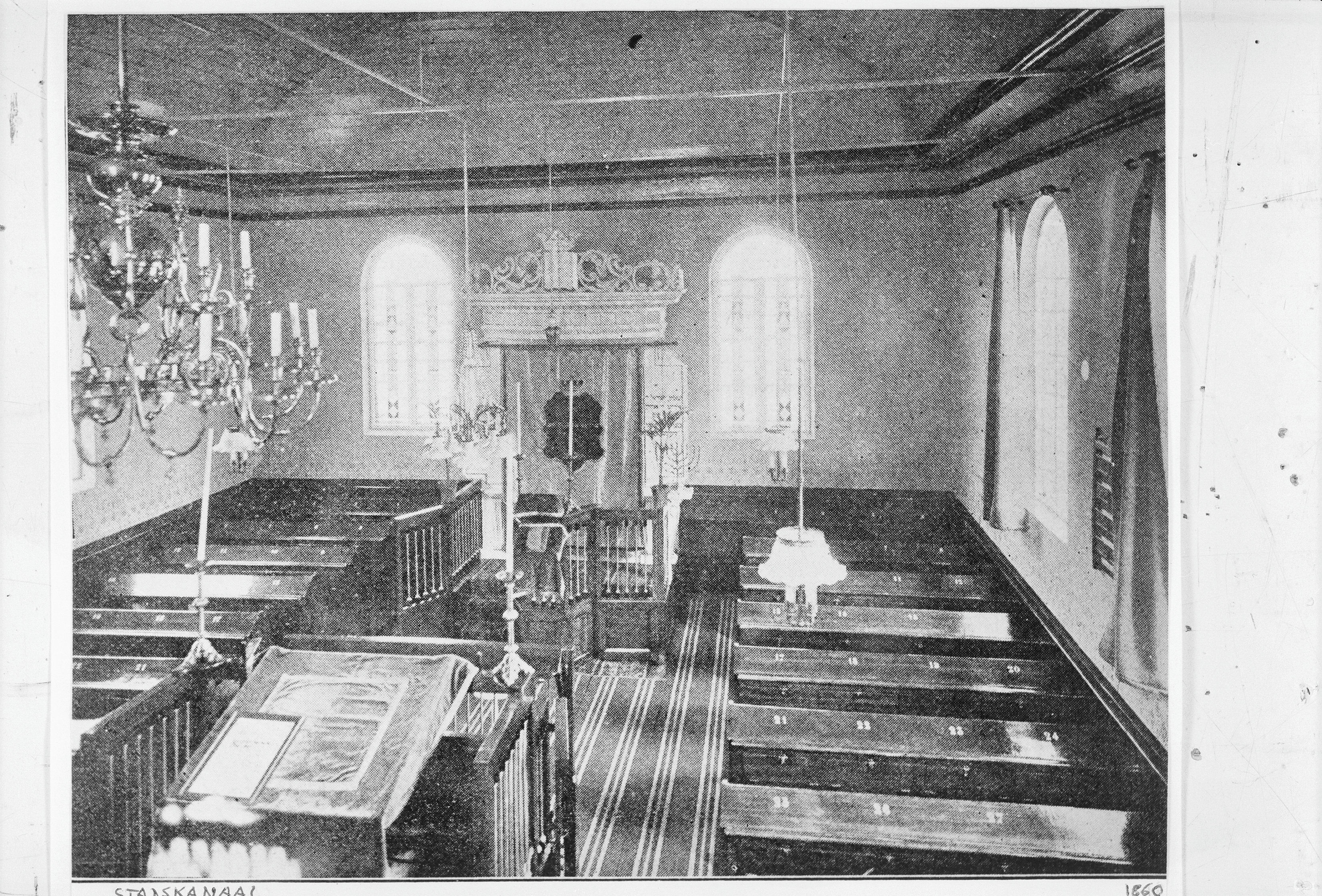
Interior of the old synagogue

== International relations ==
Stadskanaal is twinned with

- Bielsko-Biała in Poland

== Notable people ==
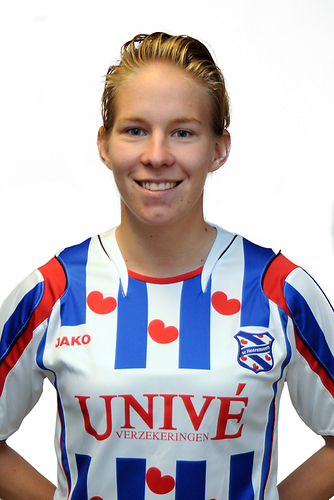
Sylvia Smit, 2008

- Cornelis Dopper (1870 in Stadskanaal – 1939) a Dutch composer, conductor and teacher
- Charles de Wolff (1932 in Mussel – 2011) a Dutch organist and conductor
- Henk Wijngaard (born 1946 in Stadskanaal) a Dutch country singer
- Henk Bleker (born 1953 in Onstwedde) a retired Dutch politician and jurist

=== Sport ===
- Jannes Munneke (born 1949 in Musselkanaal) a retired Dutch rower, competed at the 1972 Summer Olympics
- Sylvia Smit (born 1986 in Stadskanaal) a Dutch female footballer
