= Onstwedde =

- Village
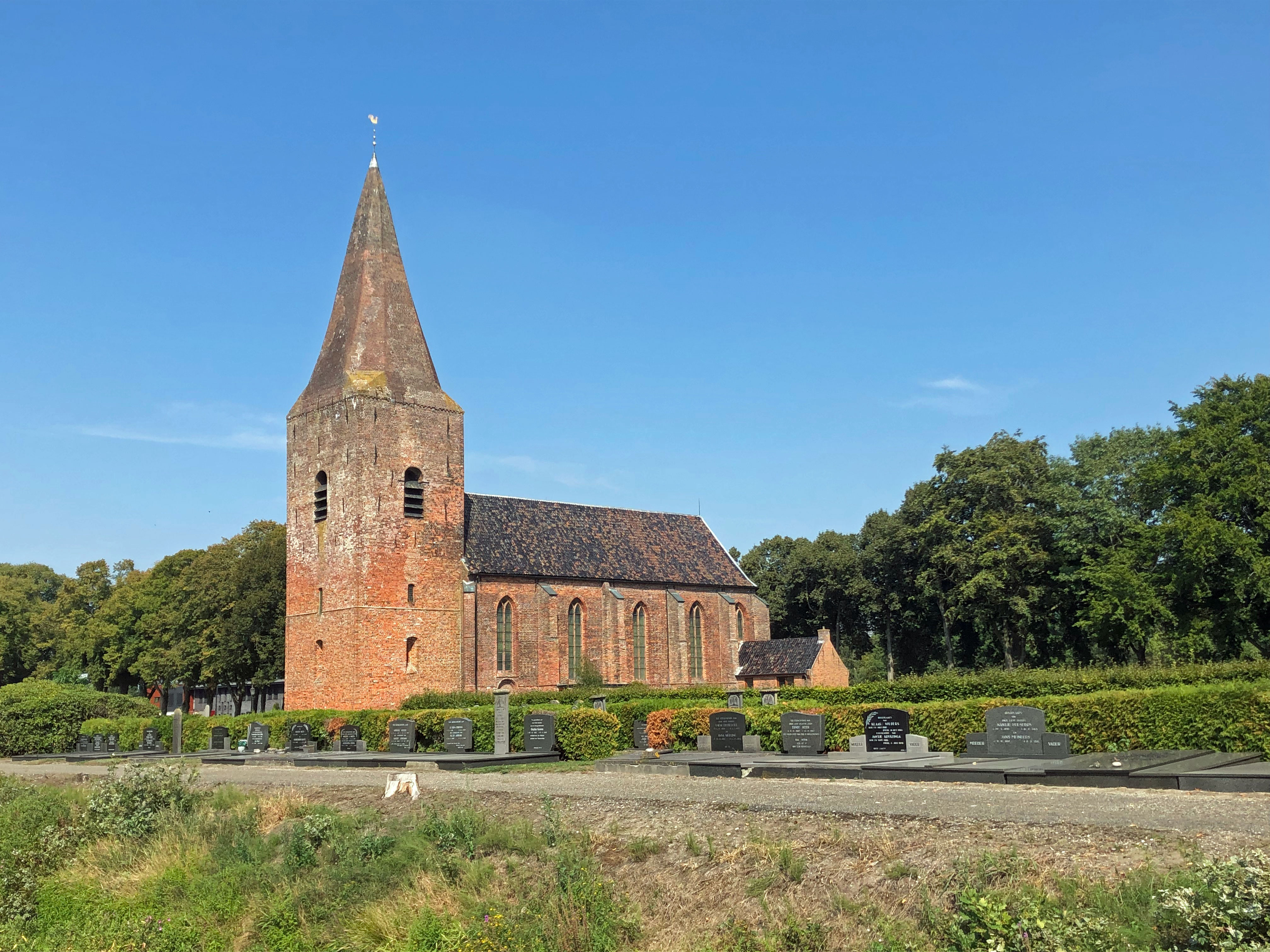
- Nicolaas Church in 2008

- Location of Onstwedde in the province of Groningen Onstwedde (Netherlands)
- Coordinates: 53°2′7″N 7°2′28″E
- Country: Netherlands
- Province: Groningen
- Municipality: Stadskanaal
- Established: 875

Area
  - Total: 40.57 km^{2} (15.66 sq mi)
- Elevation: 5 m (16 ft)

Population (2021)
  - Total: 2,960
  - Density: 73.0/km^{2} (189/sq mi)
- Postal code: 9591
- Area code: 0599
- Website: www.onstwedde.info

Onstwedde (Dutch pronunciation: [ɔnstˈʋɛdə]) is a village in the region of Westerwolde, in Groningen province in the Netherlands. It is part of the municipality of Stadskanaal and is located some kilometers to the northeast of the center of Stadskanaal, and also southeast from Pekela.

Onstwedde was also the former name of the municipality of Stadskanaal, until 1969. After Sellingen, Onstwedde is the only village where the Westerwold dialect is still spoken.

== History ==
Onstwedde was first mentioned in 875 as Uneswido in documents of the Werden Abbey. The name means the forest (-wido similar to the English wood) of Une (first name). The village is a double esdorp, a communal pasture surrounded by houses. The northern pasture was called Wold, and the southern pasture Loug. Onstwedde was a part of Westerwolde, a region dominated by raised bogs which formed the natural border between Groningen, East Frisia and the Prince-Bishopric of Münster. Onstwedde is located in the valley of the Mussel-Aa river, and was a fertile island surrounded by bogs on all sides.

A dominant feature of Onstwedde is the Nicolaas Church which was constructed around 1500. It has a 41 metres (135 ft) tall tower, which is at least one and a half century older. The walls are 2 metres (6 ft 7 in) thick, and it used to be surrounded by a moat and could be accessed via a drawbridge. It is assumed that the church was also used as a fortification.

Onstwedde used to be the main village of the region. In 1765, the city of Groningen started to dig the Stadskanaal to the south of Onstwedde in order to exploit the peat. In 1840, the population of Onstwedde was 2,405 people, and Stadskanaal had 1,980 inhabitants. Stadskanaal soon surpassed Onstwedde, and in 1882, the town hall was moved to Stadskanaal. In 1969, the municipality was renamed Stadskanaal.

On 20 April 1943, the Royal Air Force bomber Mosquito II crashed and burnt in Smeerling near Onstwedde. The crew members are buried in a Commonwealth War Grave on the municipal cemetery.

== Geography and tourism ==
Near the village are two relatively high hills of around ten meters above sea level: the Onstwedder Holte, with a 198-hectare common (the largest in Westerwolde), and the common near Veenhuizen. These hills are moraines from the Saalian, the penultimate ice age. On the north side of the village, on a flank of the Onstwedder Holte, lies the Dr. Hommesbos, a nature reserve of the Groninger Landschap (Groningen Landscape). South of the village were some of Westerwolde's oldest arable lands: the 'Hoge en Reuve Oerde' and the Oerde.

Onstwedde is one of the places in the Netherlands where salt domes are found in the subsurface.

The eastern side of the village is characterized by river dunes, small woods and copses, ash trees, and low-lying land along the Mussel A and Ruiten Aa streams and their former courses.

== Education ==
The two elementary schools of Onstwedde merged into a single entity. Since 2011, the kindergarten, elementary school and high school moved into MFA De Bast, a single building. Onstwedde is one of the few places in the Netherlands where all educational facilities are concentrated in a single building.

== Smeerling ==
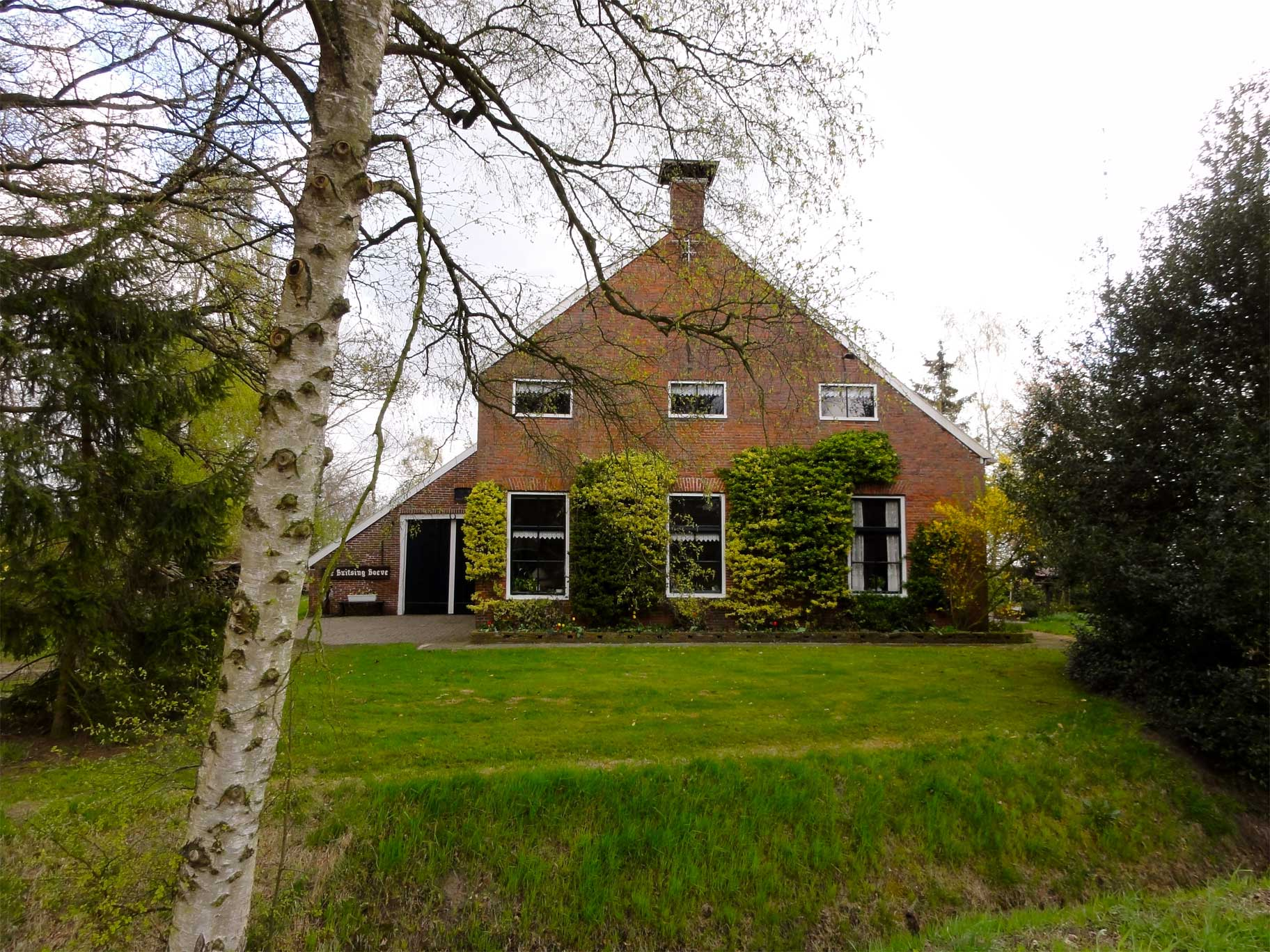
Smeerling 18

The hamlet of Smeerling is located on the road to Vlagtwedde. It contains about ten houses and is home to approximately 25 people, and is considered a part of Onstwedde for statistical and postal services.

There are eight farms in the hamlet which are in similar condition to the 1830 situation. Five of the farms are monuments, the others are from a later date, but traditionally constructed and match the surroundings. In 1972, the entire hamlet was designated a protected monument. The protected area measures 91.6 hectares (226 acres). A two kilometre path has been constructed through the hamlet, forests and meadows of Smeerling.

== Notable people ==
- Henk Bleker (born 1953), Dutch politician
- Izaak Reijnders (1879–1966), Dutch general

== Gallery ==
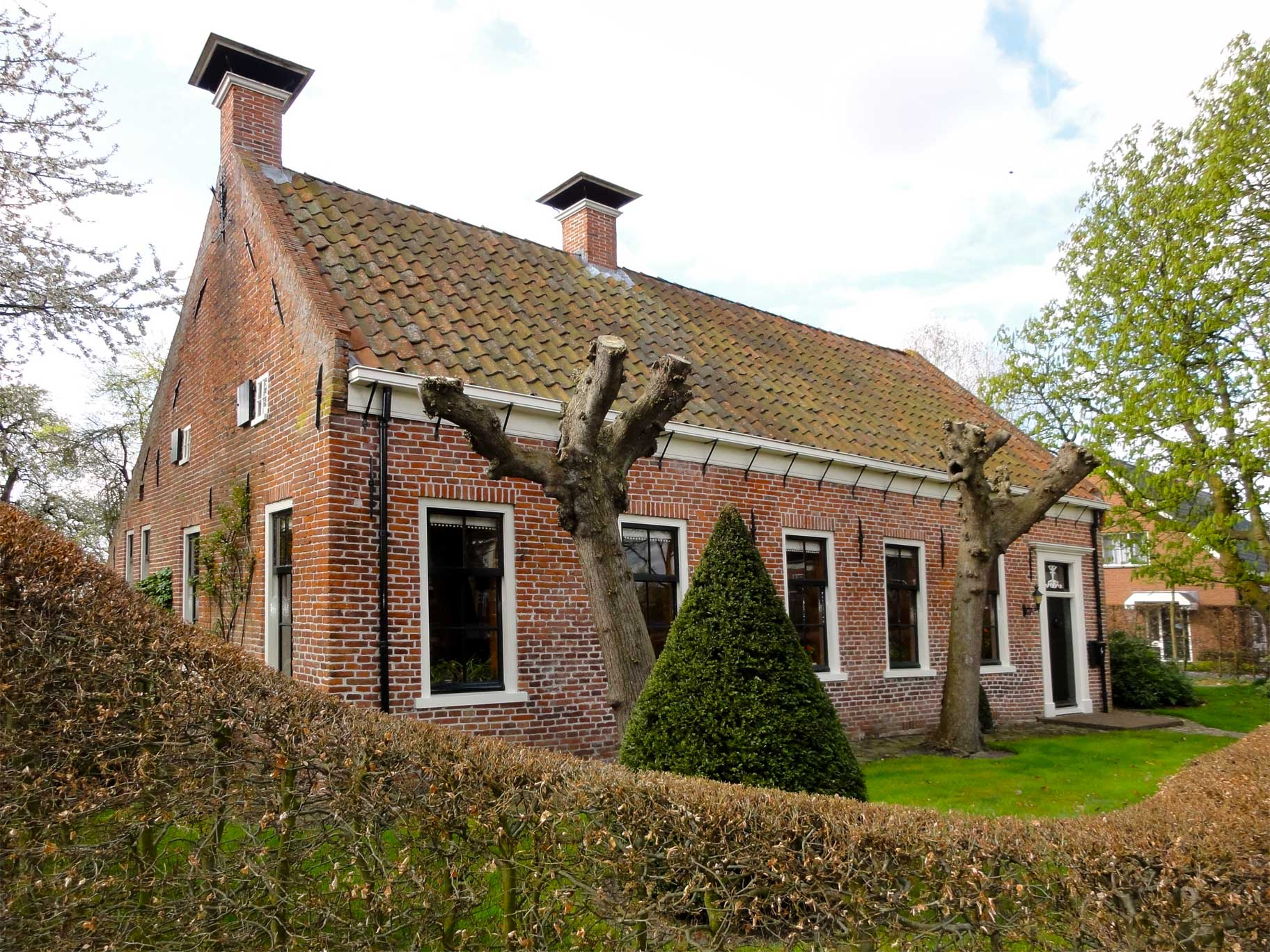
Former town hall

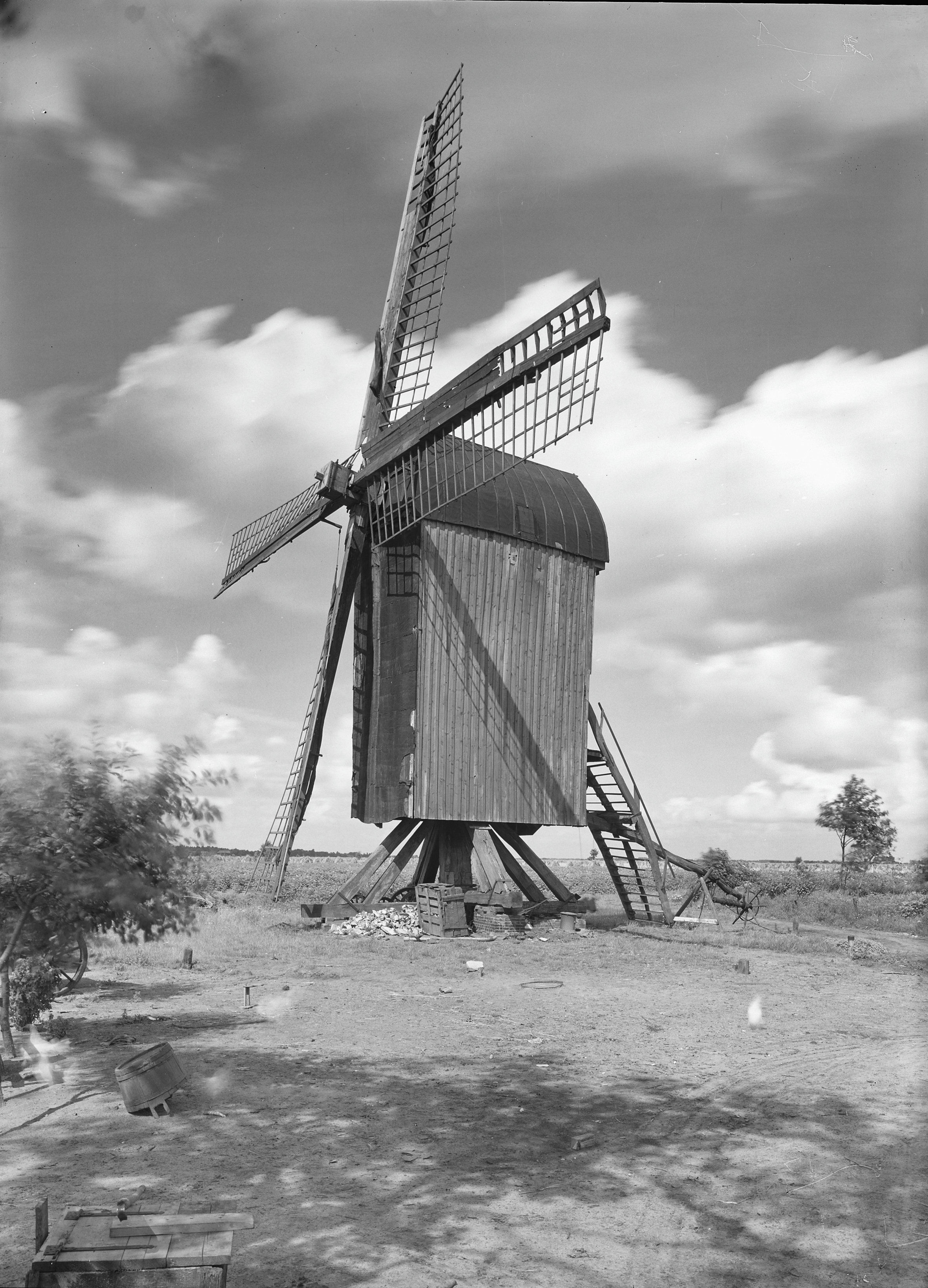
Post mill (1936)

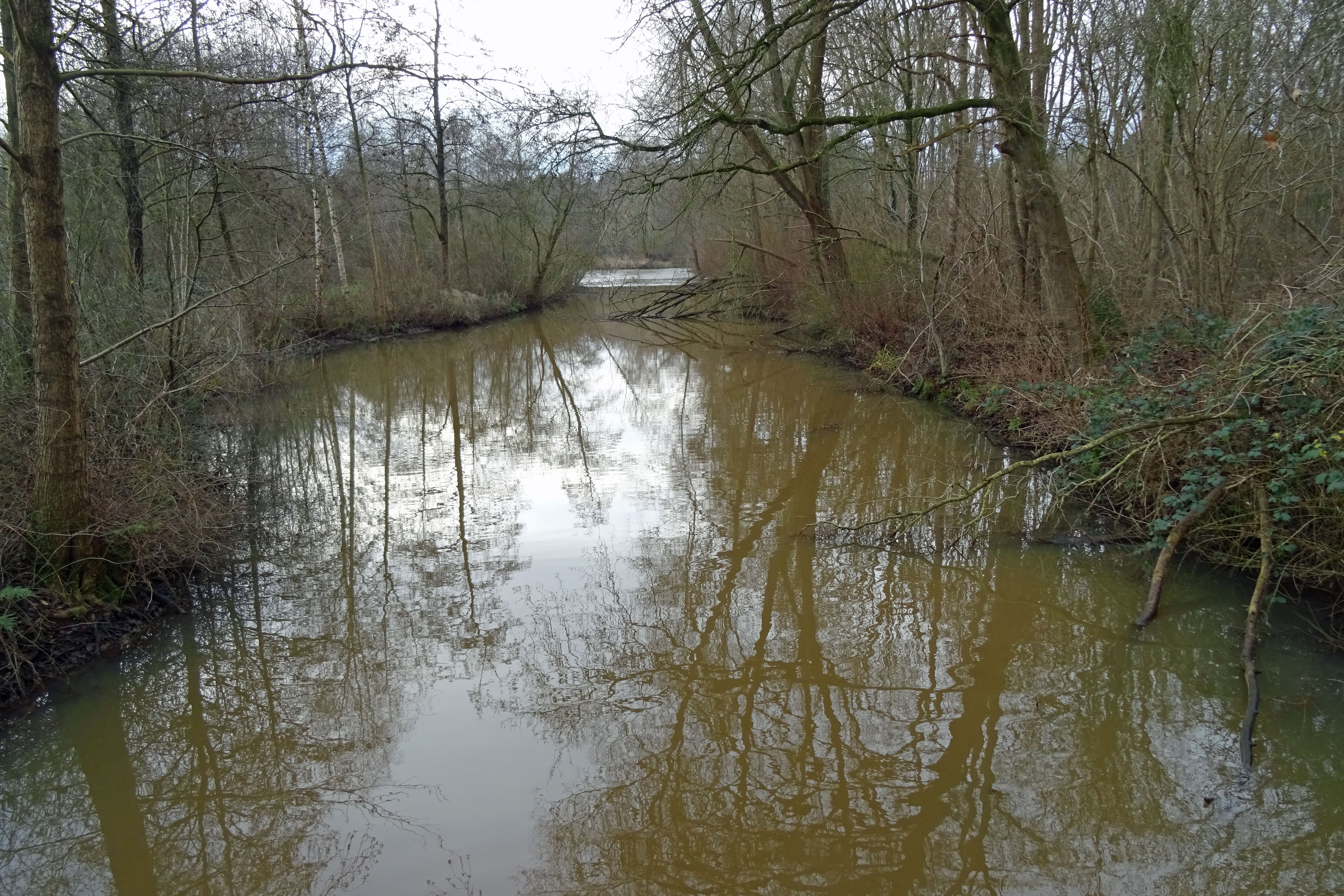
Pagediep, a remnant of the former bogs
