= Sienie Strikwerda =

Dutch anti–nuclear weapons activist

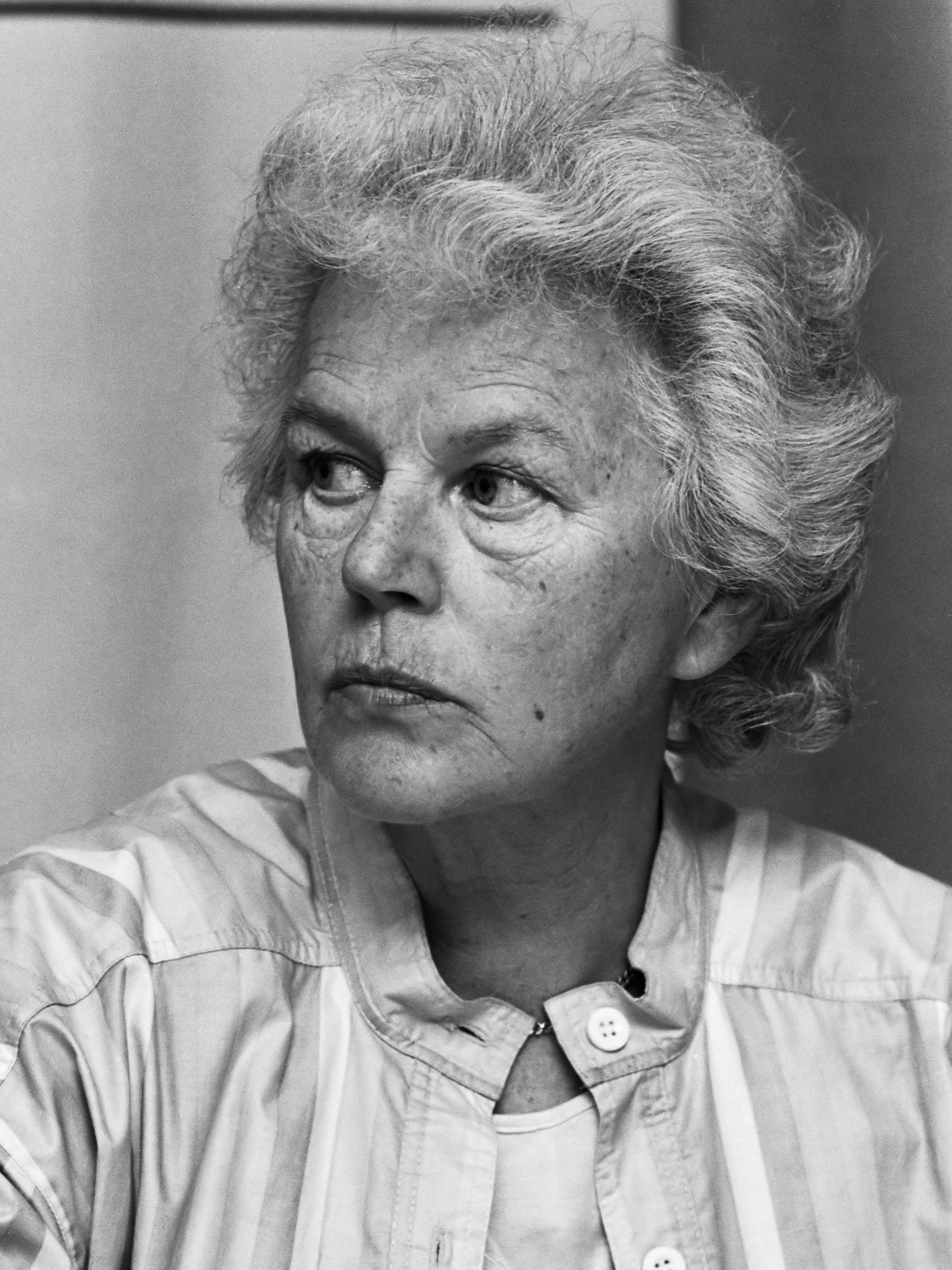
- Strikwerda (1984)

Chairperson Committee Cruise Missiles No
- In office 1982 – 3 October 1986

Provincial Council of North Holland
- In office 1991–1995

Personal details
- Born: Geesiena Jacoba van Klinken; 7 November 1921 Musselkanaal, Groningen, Netherlands
- Died: 23 June 2013 (aged 91) Amsterdam, Netherlands
- Party: Labour Party (PvdA)
- Occupation: educator, feminist and anti–nuclear weapons activist

Geesiena Jacoba "Sienie" Strikwerda (née van Klinken; 7 November 1921 – 23 June 2013) was a Dutch educator, feminist, and anti–nuclear weapons activist. She served as chairperson of the Committee Cruise Missiles No, the national committee against nuclear cruise missiles. On 29 October 1983, the committee organised a demonstration of 550,000 people which was the largest demonstration in the history of the Netherlands. In 1985, she offered Prime Minister Ruud Lubbers, a petition with 3.7 million signatures. She served in the Provincial Council of North Holland between 1991 and 1995.

== Biography ==
Van Klinken was born on 7 November 1921 in Musselkanaal, Netherlands. In the 1930s, the family moved to Leeuwarden where she spend her youth. In May 1940, she obtained her teaching degree with a specialisation in English. She worked as a nurse in the Wilhelmina Gasthuis, a hospital in Amsterdam. In 1944, she met Pé Strikwerda and became pregnant. The couple later married, however she needed a note from her father for her release from the hospital, and it marked her beginning as a feminist.

In 1946, Strikwerda joined the Nederlandse Christen Vrouwenbond (Dutch Christian Women Union). In the mid-1960s, she worked in the catechesis of the Dutch Reformed Church. In 1969, she started teaching religion and social history in high schools. In 1971, she became the Chairperson of the Nederlandse Christen Vrouwenbond, and served until 1976. During her tenure, she was an activist for abortion, birth control, and the acceptance of homosexuality.

== Anti-nuclear weapons activist ==
In 1979, Strikwerda joined Vrouwen tegen Kernwapens (Women against Nuclear Weapons). On 6 December 1979, a demonstration of approximately 10,000 women was organised against the deployment of 48 nuclear cruise missiles in the Netherlands. The group marched to the Binnenhof, the seat of the States General of the Netherlands, and Strikwerda climbed on a vehicle to address the crowd.

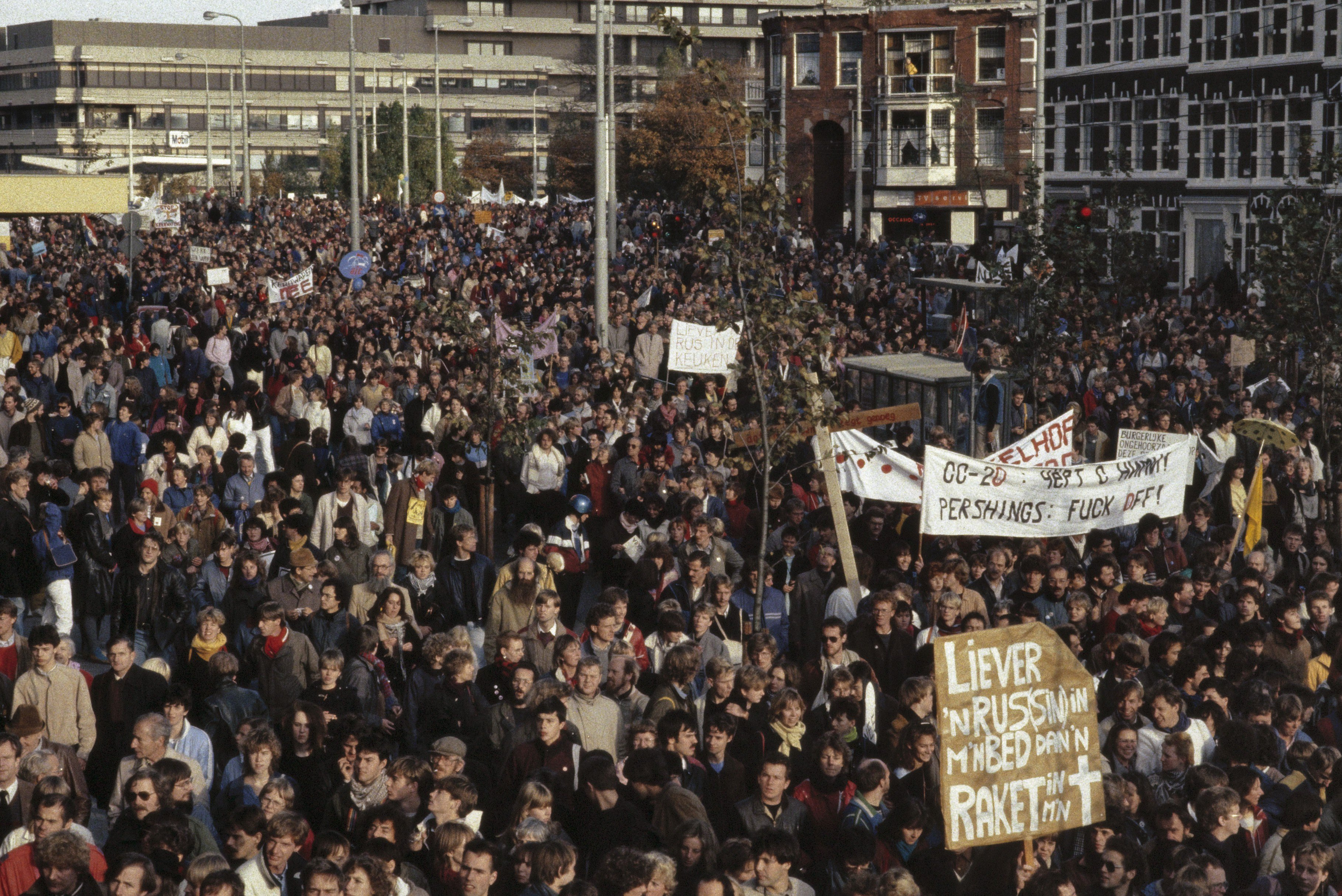
Demonstration of 29 October 1983

On 21 November 1981, a large demonstration against nuclear weapons was organised in Amsterdam. The demonstration was attended by 400,000 to 450,000 people, and was organised by the Interkerkelijk Vredesberaad (Interdenominational Peace Council) in collaboration with political parties, unions, and peace groups. A better organisational structure was needed, and in 1982, the Komitee Kruisraketten Nee (Committee Cruise Missiles No) was established with Strikwerda as chairperson.

On 29 October 1983, the Committee Cruise Missiles No organised a demonstration in The Hague which was attended by 550,000 people, and was the largest demonstration in the history of the Netherlands. More than 3,000 buses arrived in The Hague, and the Dutch railways scheduled 120 extra trains. After the demonstration, the doors at Den Haag Centraal railway station were kept closed and people were let in piecemeal to prevent overcrowding. There were no incidents, and only 16 arrests from a counter-demonstration.

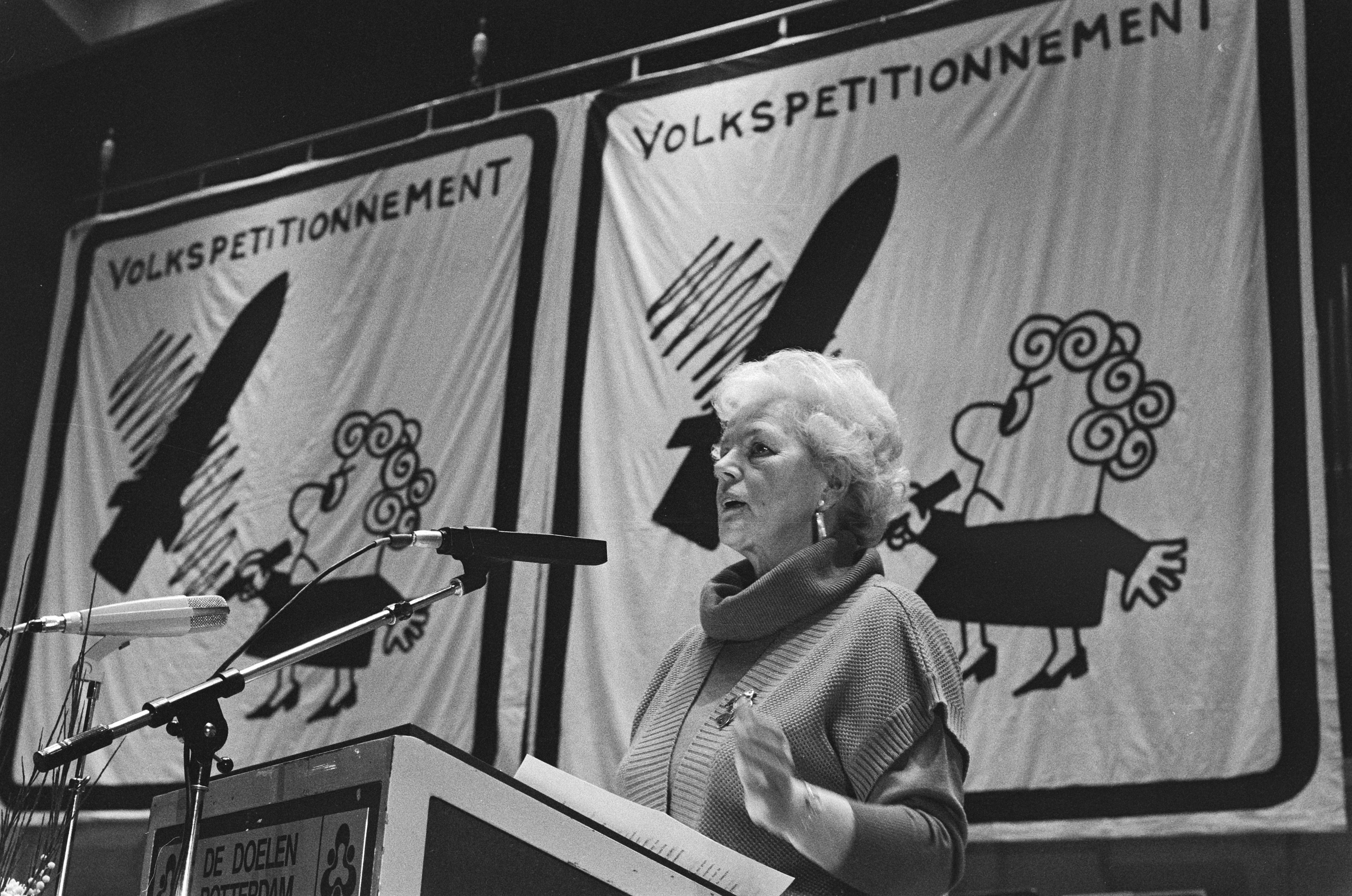
Strikwerda during the 1985 petition against cruise missiles

Prime Minister Ruud Lubbers announced on television that decisions were not made by the size of a demonstration, but by the majority in parliament. To further pressure the government, a petition was organised. In 1985, a petition with 3.7 million signatures was offered to Lubbers.

Despite strong opposition against nuclear weapons, the government decided to place the cruise missiles, but with a two-year delay. In 1986, Strikwerda announced her retirement as chairperson effective 3 October. On 8 December 1987, the Intermediate-Range Nuclear Forces Treaty was signed which resulted in a cancellation of the cruise missiles in the Netherlands.

== Later life ==
Strikwerda became a member of the Labour Party. In 1991, she participated in the elections for the Provincial Council of North Holland, and served until 1995.

Strikwerda died on 26 June 2013 in Amsterdam, at the age of 91.
