= Stadskanaal Airfield =

Stadskanaal Airfield Vliegveld Stadskanaal
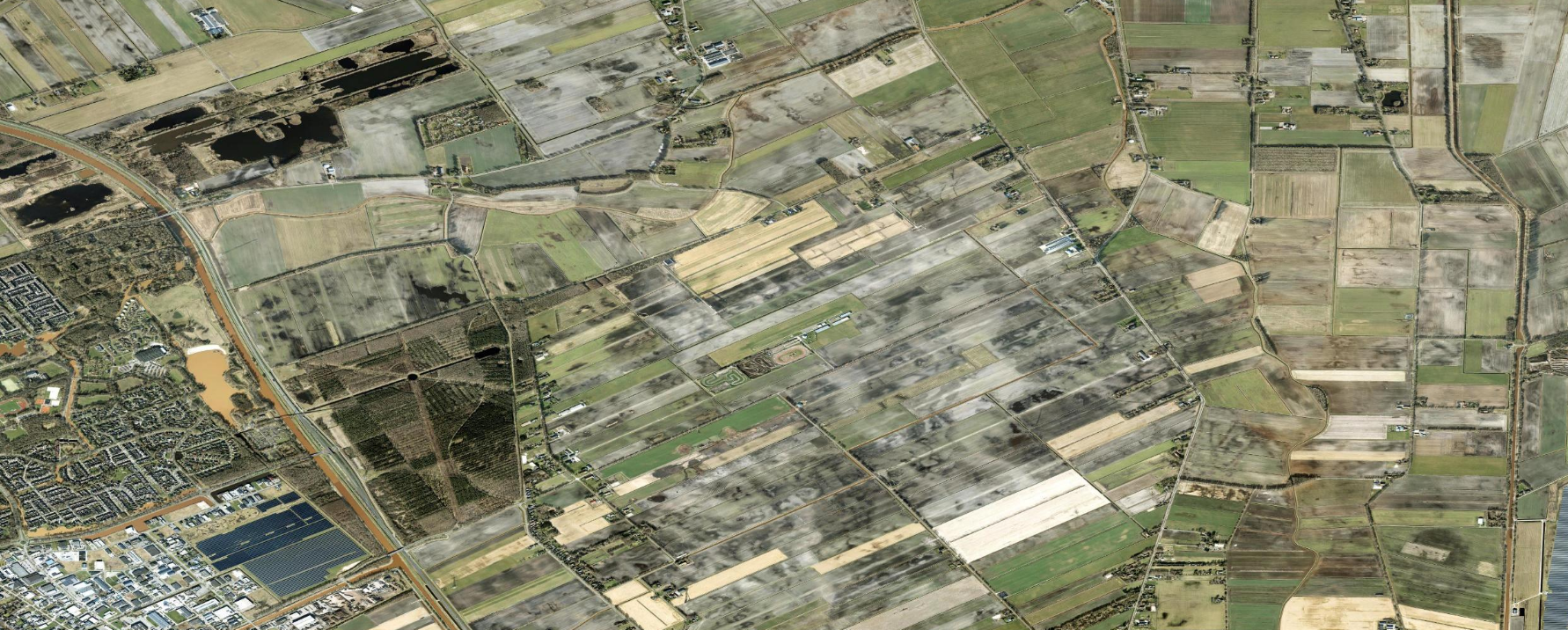
- IATA: none; ICAO: EHST

Summary
- Airport type: Public
- Operator: Vliegveld Stadskanaal
- Location: Stadskanaal
- Elevation AMSL: 14 ft (4.3 m)
- Coordinates: 52°59′55″N 007°01′22″E
- Interactive map of Stadskanaal Airfield

Runways
Direction	Length		Surface
Direction	m	ft	Surface
06/24	300	984	Grass
- Sources: AIP

Stadskanaal airfield (Dutch: Vliegveld Stadskanaal) (ICAO: EHST) is a small ultralight aviation only airfield in the Netherlands 2 NM (3.7 km; 2.3 mi) east of Stadskanaal in the province Groningen. It has one 300 m (984 ft) grass runway in the direction 06/24.
