= Barnflair =

- Hamlet
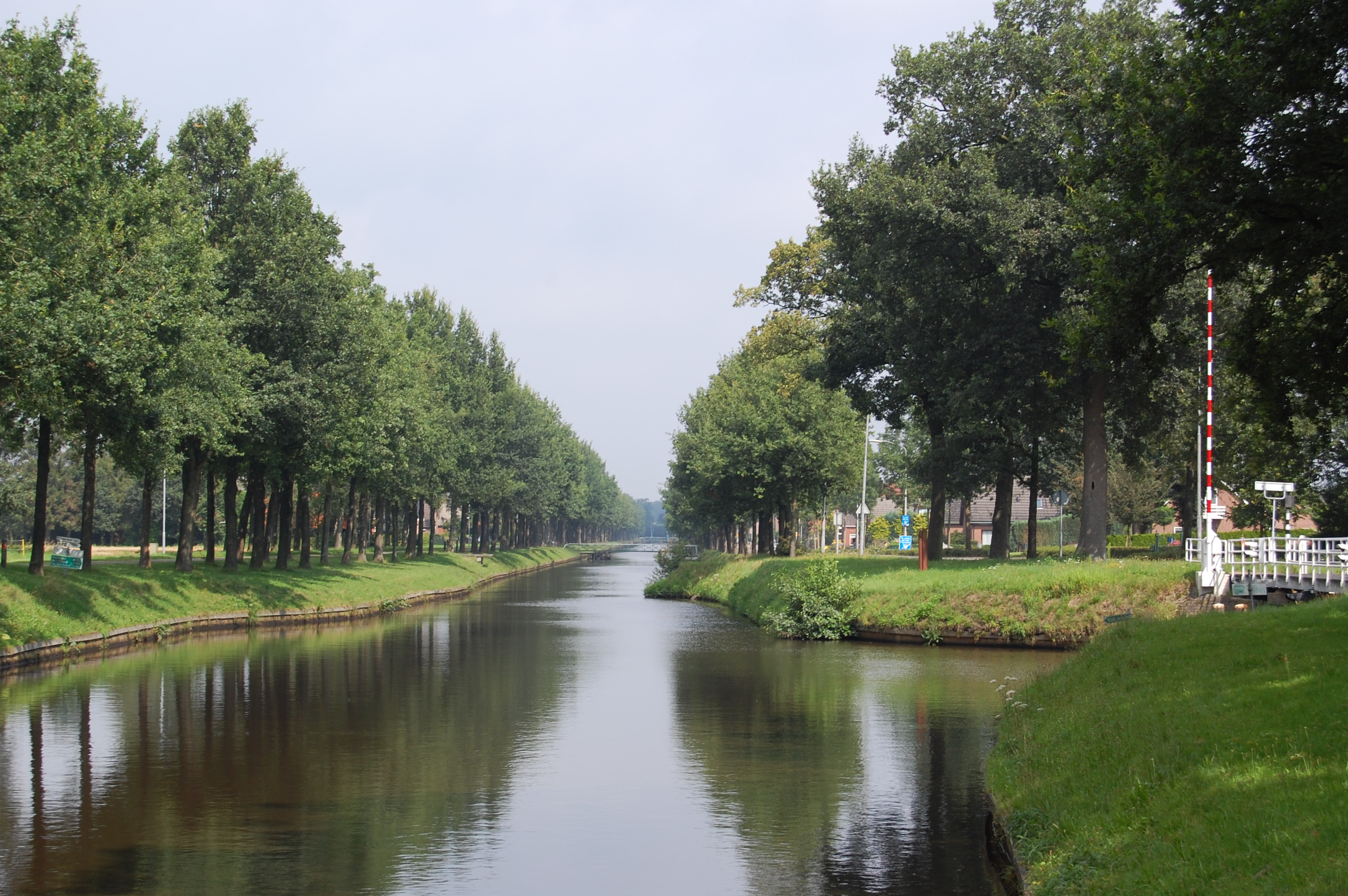

- Location in the province of Groningen in the Netherlands Barnflair (Netherlands)
- Coordinates: 52°51′5″N 7°4′54″E
- Country: Netherlands
- Province: Groningen
- Municipality: Westerwolde

Area
  - Total: 1.73 km^{2} (0.67 sq mi)
- Elevation: 12 m (39 ft)

Population (2021)
  - Total: 205
  - Density: 118/km^{2} (307/sq mi)
- Time zone: UTC+1 (CET)
  - Summer (DST): UTC+2 (CEST)
- Postal code: 9561
- Dialing code: 0599

Barnflair (Dutch pronunciation: [ˈbɑrnfleːr] or [ˈbɑrəɱfleːr]) is a hamlet in the Dutch province of Groningen. It is a part of the municipality of Westerwolde, and lies about 15 km northeast of Emmen.

== History ==
It was first mentioned in 1466 as "an dat Barenvledder", and means "moorland which can be used as a fuel". The postal authorities have placed Barnflair under Ter Apel, and it is considered part of the build up area of Ter Apel, however it is still slightly outside of the village, and could be considered a hamlet. Barnflair consists of about 100 houses.
