= Bareveld =

Village in Drenthe and Groningen, Netherlands

Bareveld Boareveld (Gronings)
- Village
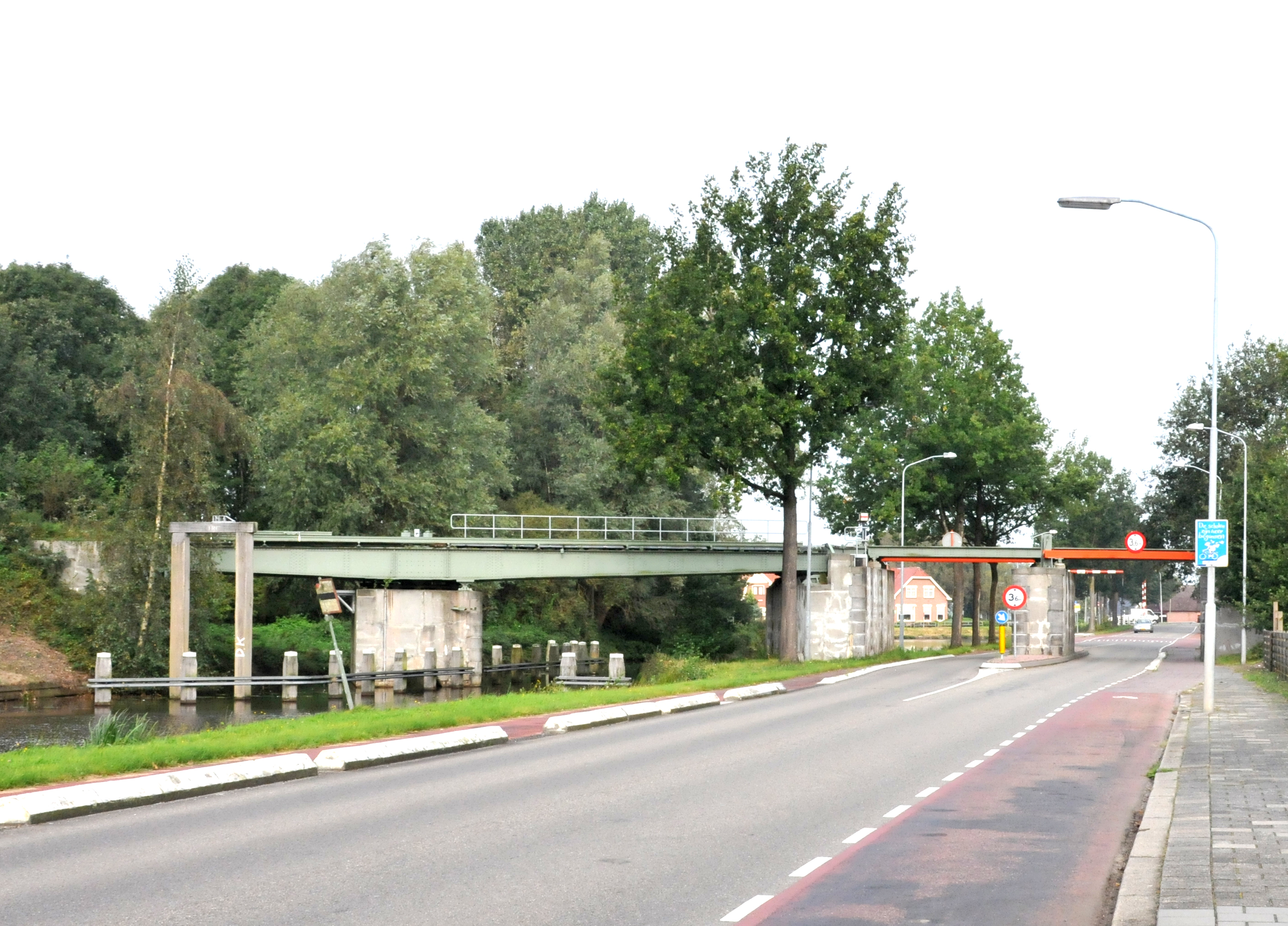
- Railway bridge in Bareveld

- Location in the Netherlands
- Coordinates: 53.05000°N 6.84602°E
- Country: Netherlands
- Province: Drenthe Groningen
- Municipality: Aa en Hunze Veendam
- Elevation: 3.6 m (12 ft)

Population
  - Total: c. 400
- Time zone: UTC+1 (CET)
  - Summer (DST): UTC+2 (CEST)
- Postcode: 9512; 9648
- Area code: 0599

Bareveld (Dutch: [ˈbaːrəˌvɛlt]; Gronings: Boareveld) is a Dutch village on the border of the provinces of Groningen and Drenthe. The Drenthe part of the village belongs to the municipality of Aa en Hunze, the Groningen part of the village has been added to the municipality of Veendam. It is located on the N33, in between the linear villages of Eexterveenschekanaal and Nieuwediep.

The Groningen part has 380 inhabitants (2004) and is administratively part of the built-up area of the village of Wildervank, and is therefore no longer always seen as a real part of Bareveld. Only the part that falls under the municipality of Aa and Hunze has its own place name sign.

== History ==
The village was first attested as Baarveld in 1781. It is probably a compound of baar ('barren, infertile') or Dutch Low Saxon boar ('wild, inhospitable') and veld ('field').

Bareveld is located on the Semslinie from 1615, a straight line between the Martini Tower in the city of Groningen and Ter Apel that was intended to put an end to the disputes of the time.

There used to be a dam near Bareveld. Based on a covenant from 1817 between the city of Groningen and the Drenthe peat markets from Eext to Valthe, it was not allowed to be crossed. In that covenant, the city made an arrangement with the Drenthe people for the drainage of their peat via the Drentse Monden over the Stadskanaal and the Grevelingskanaal via the Kieldiep and the Winschoterdiep to the city. The dam had to ensure that the peat would not be transported via Veendam, because that canal was not owned by the city. The city would not only miss out on passage fees, but also feared losing control. The dam was not removed until 1873.

In 1993 the line became a tourist railway of the Stadskanaal Rail Foundation (STAR), whose trains also stop in Wildervank. There are concrete plans to reopen the route section between the Veendam and Stadskanaal stations for regular passenger transport in December 2024, but in March 2019 it was decided that the trains will pass Bareveld.
