= Johan Sems =

Dutch cartographer (1572–1635)

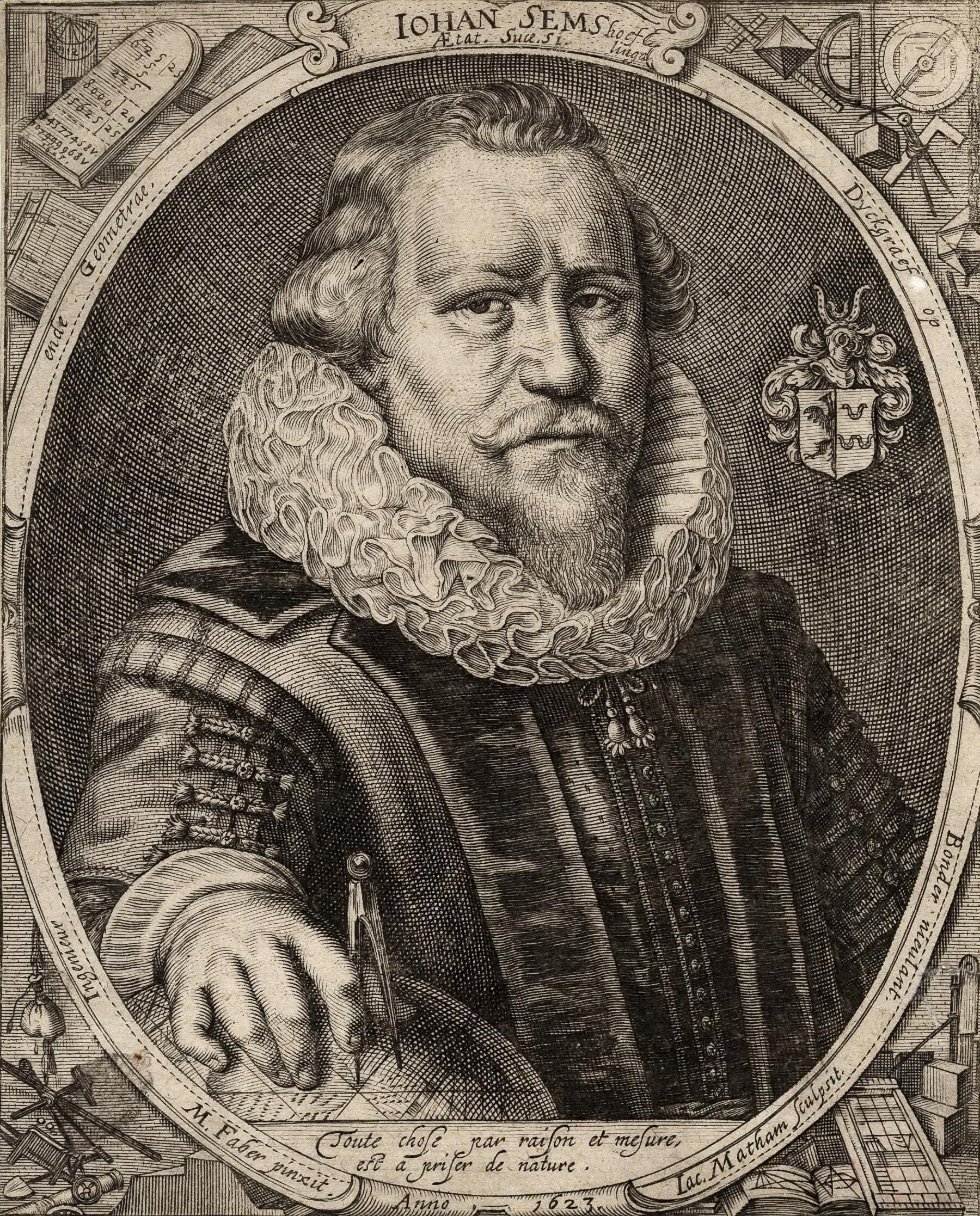
Engraving of Sems made by Jacob Matham, based on a portrait by Martin Faber

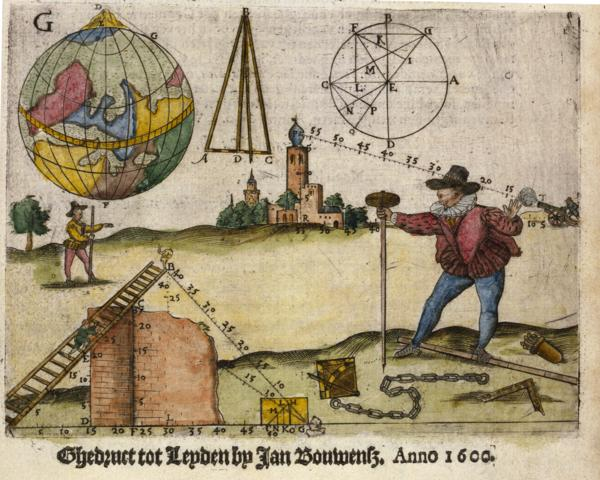
Cover of Practijck des lantmetens (1600)

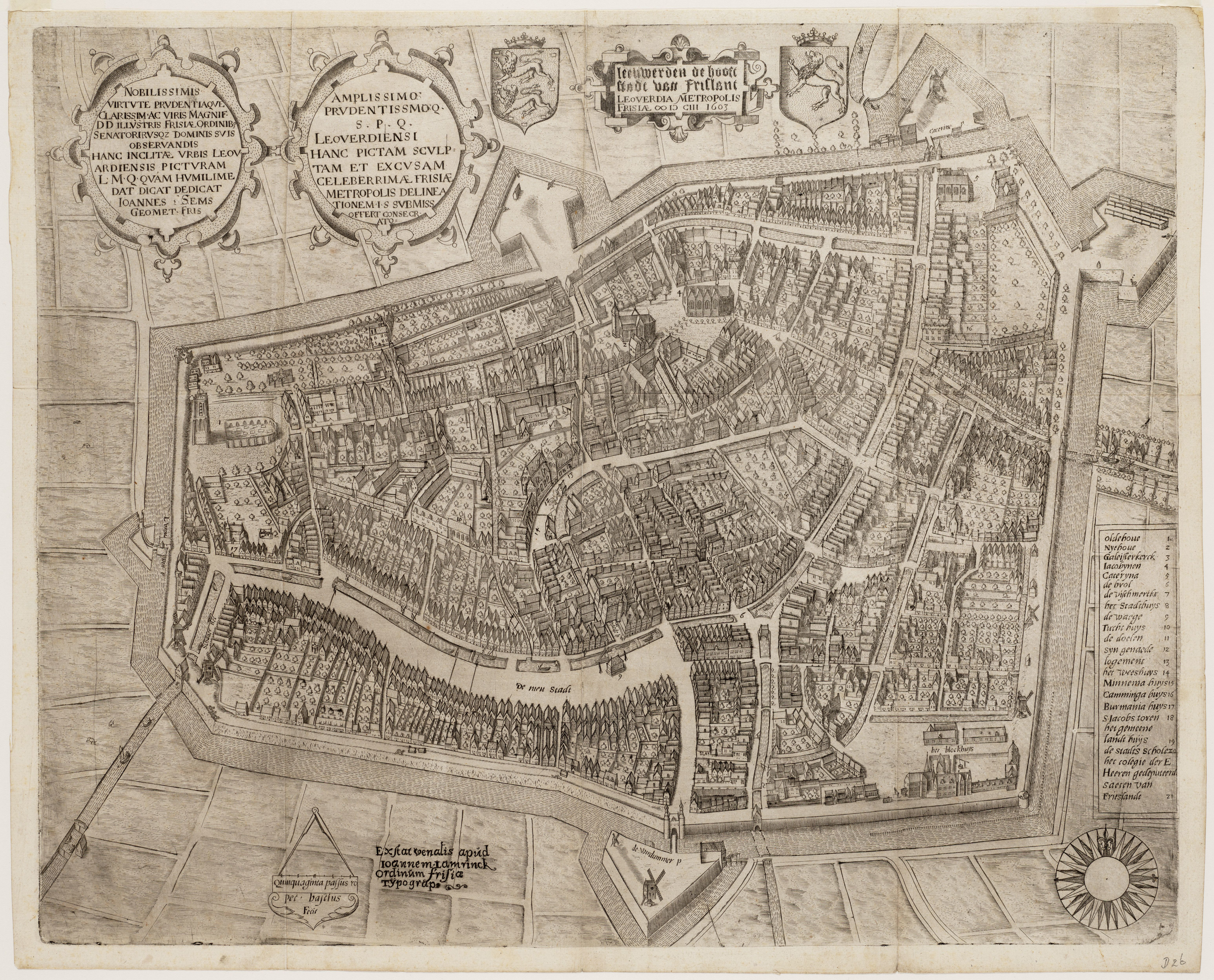
Map of Leeuwarden made by Sems in 1603

Johan Sems (1572 – January 1635), sometimes known as Johan Semp, was a Dutch cartographer, engineer and land surveyor. He specialized in land reclamation and the building of dikes and fortifications.

== Early life ==
Johan Sems was born in 1572 in Franeker, in the province of Friesland, the son of Sem IJsbrandts and Claesgen Adriaens. His surname, "Sems", is a patronym derived from his father's given name.

During his childhood the family lived in Leiden, where his father registered as a student at Leiden University. In 1584, when Sems was about twelve years old, his father died by suicide.

Unlike his father, Sems did not attend university. Instead, he appears to have acquired his knowledge of surveying, mathematics and engineering through practical training. This practical education later formed the basis of his work as a land surveyor and engineer in the northern Netherlands.

== Timeline ==
- In 1599, Sems became a silk merchant in Leeuwarden.
- 1600: The book Practijck des lantmetens, a book written by Sems and Jan Pietersz. Dou, was published. The book was used at the engineering school started by Simon Stevin.
- 1602: Sems was appointed land surveyor of Friesland.
- 1603: Sems made a detailed map of Leeuwarden, which was engraved by Pieter Bast.
- 1604-1608: Sems had the supervision over the building of the fortifications at Bourtange, Delfzijl and Bellingwolde.
- Sems bought several buildings in the city center of Leeuwarden.
- Around 1610, Sems moved to Bunde in Germany and he bought land in the Bunder Neuland, a polder that was created in 1604, with help from investors mainly from Amsterdam.
- 1615: Sems and Johan de la Haye determined the exact location of the border between Groningen and Drenthe, the Semslinie. They took the Martini tower as a reference point, but later measurements have shown that it would miss the Martini tower by 532 meters.
- 1616: From 30 April, Sems was involved in land reclamation at Bredstedt. Later that year he designed the Christianshavn on Amager.
- 1618: On 6 January, while he was in Denmark, Sems was asked to come to the Netherlands because of a border dispute between Groningen and Drenthe. at Ter Apel.
- 1621: Sems was back in Bunder Neuland. There were disputes between the Staten Generaal and Enno III, Count of East Frisia, about who had the rights in the polder.
- ca 1623: Sems was appointed dijkgraaf in the Bunder Neuland. In 1623, Jacob Matham produced an engraving of him, based on a portrait by Martin Faber.
- 1623: Sems lived in Groningen and his book De arithmetische fundamenten was published in Emden.
- 1625: The polder at Bredstedt was swept away by the sea during a storm.
- 1626: Sems was given the task to map the area north of Pieterburen.
- 1628: Sems got involved with the fortifications in eastern Groningen again.
- 1629 en 1632: Sems's 'movable possessions' (excluding real estate) were seized due to default of payment.
- 1634: Sems was in Dutch Brazil where he was involved as an engineer in the construction of fortifications at the conquered cities.

Sems was married twice, first to Baerthe van Soutelande and then to Catharina Jans.

== Death ==
Johan Sems died in Groningen sometime between 1 January and 8 February 1635, at about 62 years of age. The previous year he had travelled to Dutch Brazil, where he worked as an engineer on fortifications in newly conquered cities.
