= Semslinie =

Part of the border between Groningen and Drenthe, within the Netherlands

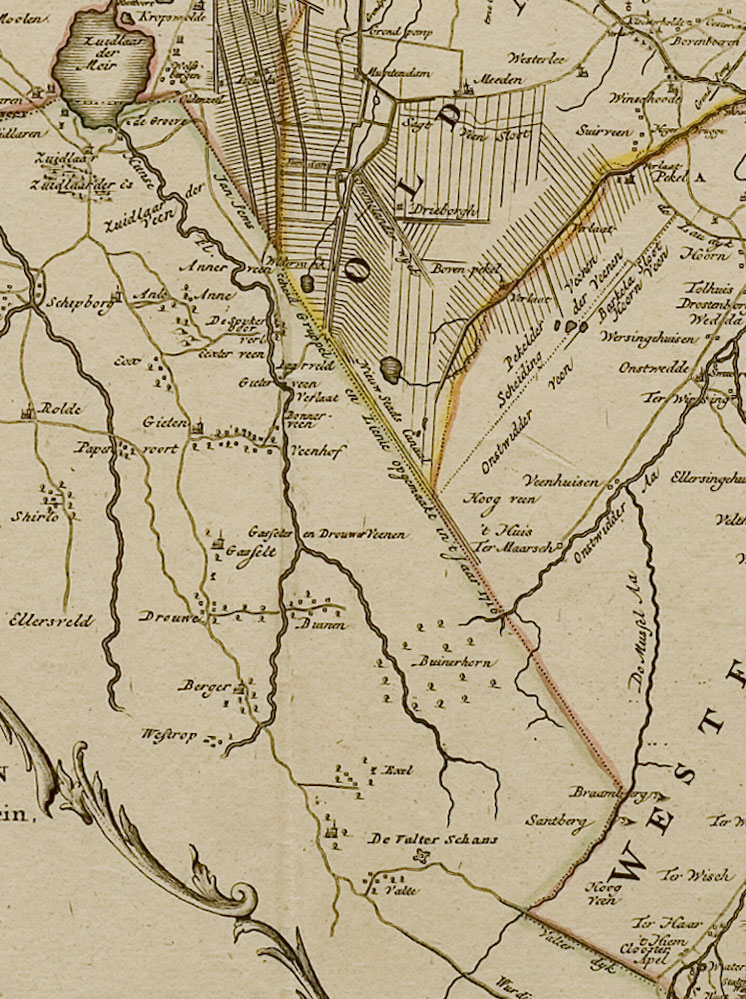
The Semslinie on a 1792 map

The Semslinie is a part of the border between the Dutch provinces of Groningen and Drenthe that runs right through the former Bourtanger Moor. The almost straight line runs from Wolfsbarge to the Huis ter Haar at Musselkanaal. The border is slightly bent at Stadskanaal. The slightly bent line between Musselkanaal and Stadskanaal is sometimes called Koningsraai. The Semslinie is named after Johan Sems.

== History ==
On August 3, 1614, the provinces of Groningen and Drenthe asked Johan Sems (asked by Groningen) and Johan de la Haye (asked by Drenthe) to determine the border between the two provinces. Determining the exact border was necessary because both provinces wanted to get peat from the bog (Bourtanger Moor) between them. Before the 17th century, there was no large-scale peat harvesting and the provinces never bothered about the exact location of the border. Another reason for determining the exact border was that Groningen and Drenthe both claimed Ter Apel.

On March 2, 1615, the map with the new border was presented. Ter Apel was allocated to Drenthe. Groningen argued that the Ter Apel Monastery used to be owned by the diocese of Münster and was never owned by the Bishopric of Utrecht of which Drenthe was once part. In October 1615, a new map was made, on which Ter Apel would become part of Groningen. This time Drenthe had objections.

In 1630, stadtholder Ernst Casimir determined that the disputed area near Ter Apel would become a communal area (Latin: compascuum). This brought a temporary end to the conflict. In 1756, Groningen began digging a canal from the village of Bareveld to Ter Apel, parallel to the Semslinie. It is called the Stadskanaal (Cities canal, not to be confused with the town Stadskanaal) and was used to transport peat. This canal became a very important waterway in the area. This led to tensions once again.

On October 14, 1815, king William I of the Netherlands, argued that Groningen and Drenthe should sign an agreement about the border and the use of the Stadskanaal. On April 5, 1817, a Royal Order concluded that the border would follow the Semslinie between Bareveld and the border between Gasselternijveenschemond and Drouwenermond (near Stadskanaal). From there on another line was drawn, called the Koningsraai. Because of the Koningsraai, Ter Apel became part of Groningen.

It is sometimes said that if the Semslinie would be extended to the northwest, it would cross the Martinitoren in the city of Groningen, just as Sems's intention was. In reality the line would miss the Martinitoren by 532 meters.
