= Master general =

Master general or Master-general can refer to:

- the Superior general of certain orders and congregations, such as
  - the Canons Regular of the Order of the Holy Cross
  - the Dominicans (Master of the Order of Preachers)
  - the Order of the Blessed Virgin Mary of Mercy
  - the Order of Saint Lazarus
  - the Society of the Holy Cross
  - the Trinitarian Order
- certain secular titles and offices, such as Master-General of the Ordnance
