= Valthermond =

- Village
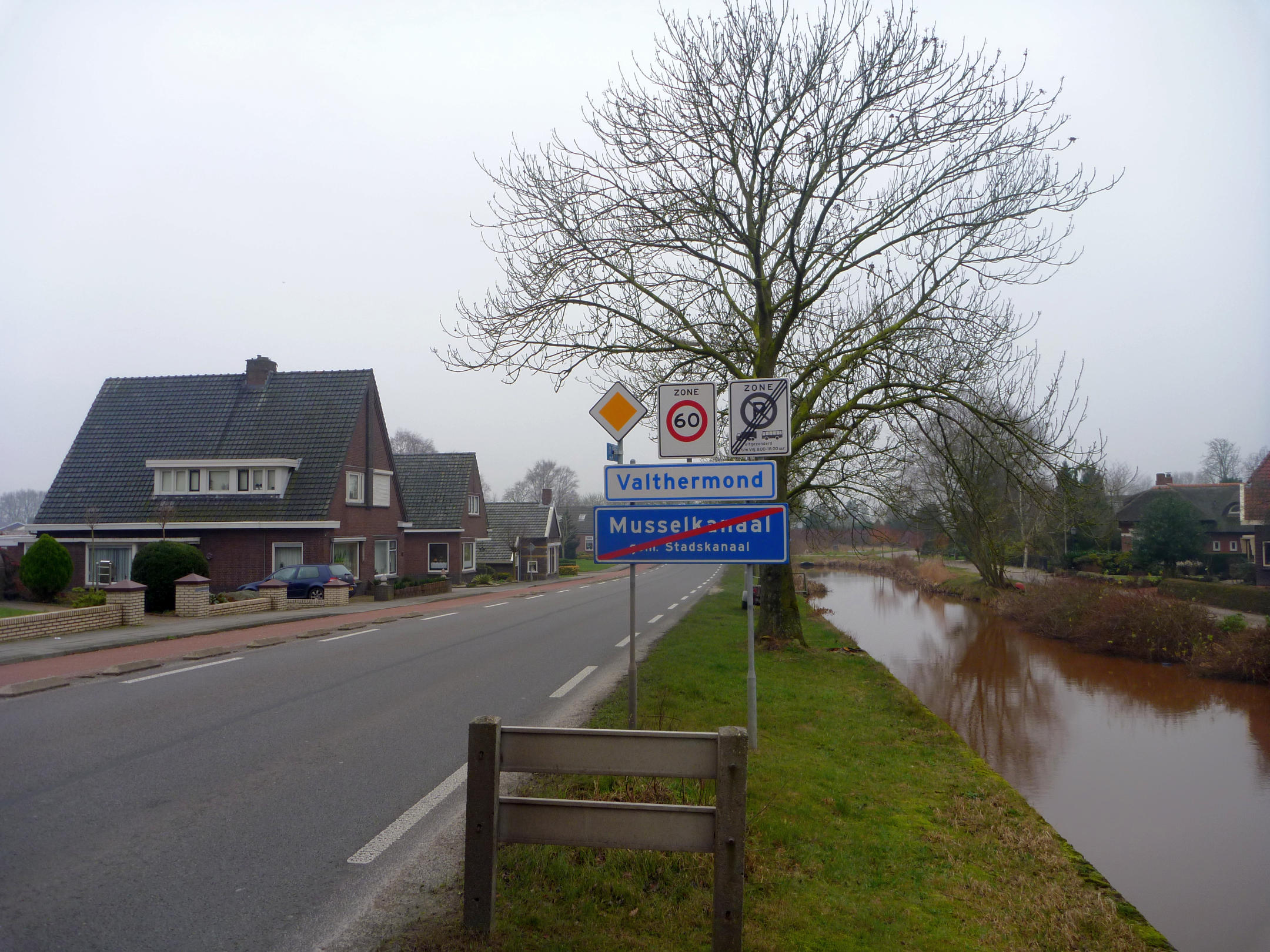

- Location of the village in the province of Drenthe Valthermond (Netherlands)
- Coordinates: 52°52′31″N 6°56′56″E
- Country: Netherlands
- Province: Drenthe
- Municipality: Borger-Odoorn
- Established: 1853

Area
  - Total: 33.40 km^{2} (12.90 sq mi)
- Elevation: 10 m (33 ft)

Population (2021)
  - Total: 3,375
  - Density: 101.0/km^{2} (261.7/sq mi)
- Time zone: UTC+1 (CET)
  - Summer (DST): UTC+2 (CEST)
- Postal code: 7876
- Dialing code: 0591

Valthermond is a village in the Dutch province of Drenthe. It is a part of the municipality of Borger-Odoorn, and lies about 18 km north of Emmen.

== History ==
The village was first mentioned between 1851 and 1855 as Valther Mond, and means "(canal) which has its mouth (in a main canal) belonging to Valthe". It is named after the eponymous canal which was dug in 1833 to excavate the peat in the area. A second canal was later dug, and that village and canal were named 2e Valthermond. The village was founded in 1853, and is one of the longest excavation settlements of the Netherlands.

The Dutch Reformed church was built in 1883, and a tower was added in 1925. A Baptist church was built in 1914, and is one of the few Baptist churches in the Netherlands other than the Mennonite churches. Valthermond used to have a railway station on the Stadskanaal to Ter Apel border railway line between 1924 and 1935. It is in use by a museum railway line. The former steam forge dates from the 1920s and used to make railway carriage and bridge parts for the peat excavation. It became a provincial monument in 2015.

== Gallery ==
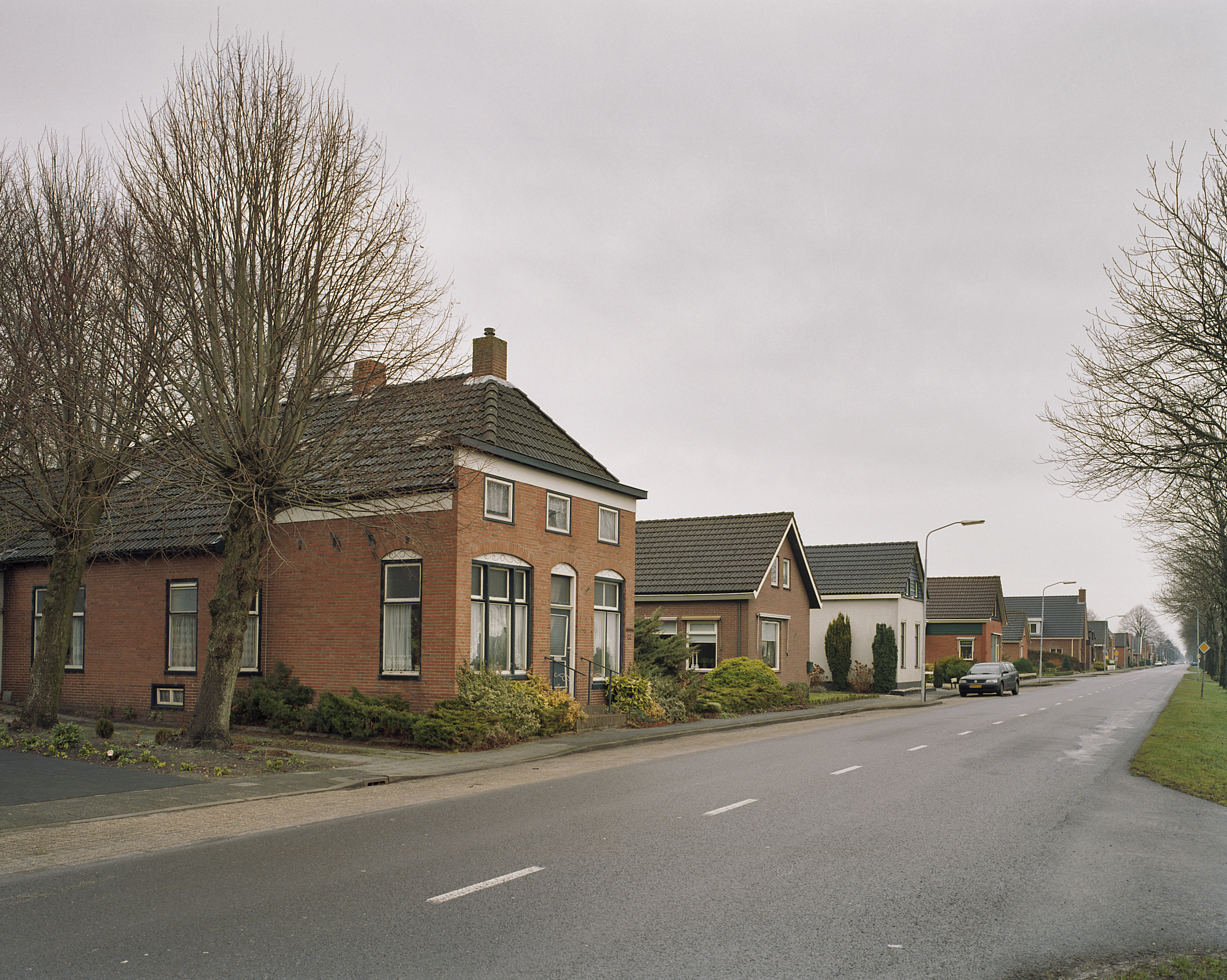
Street view

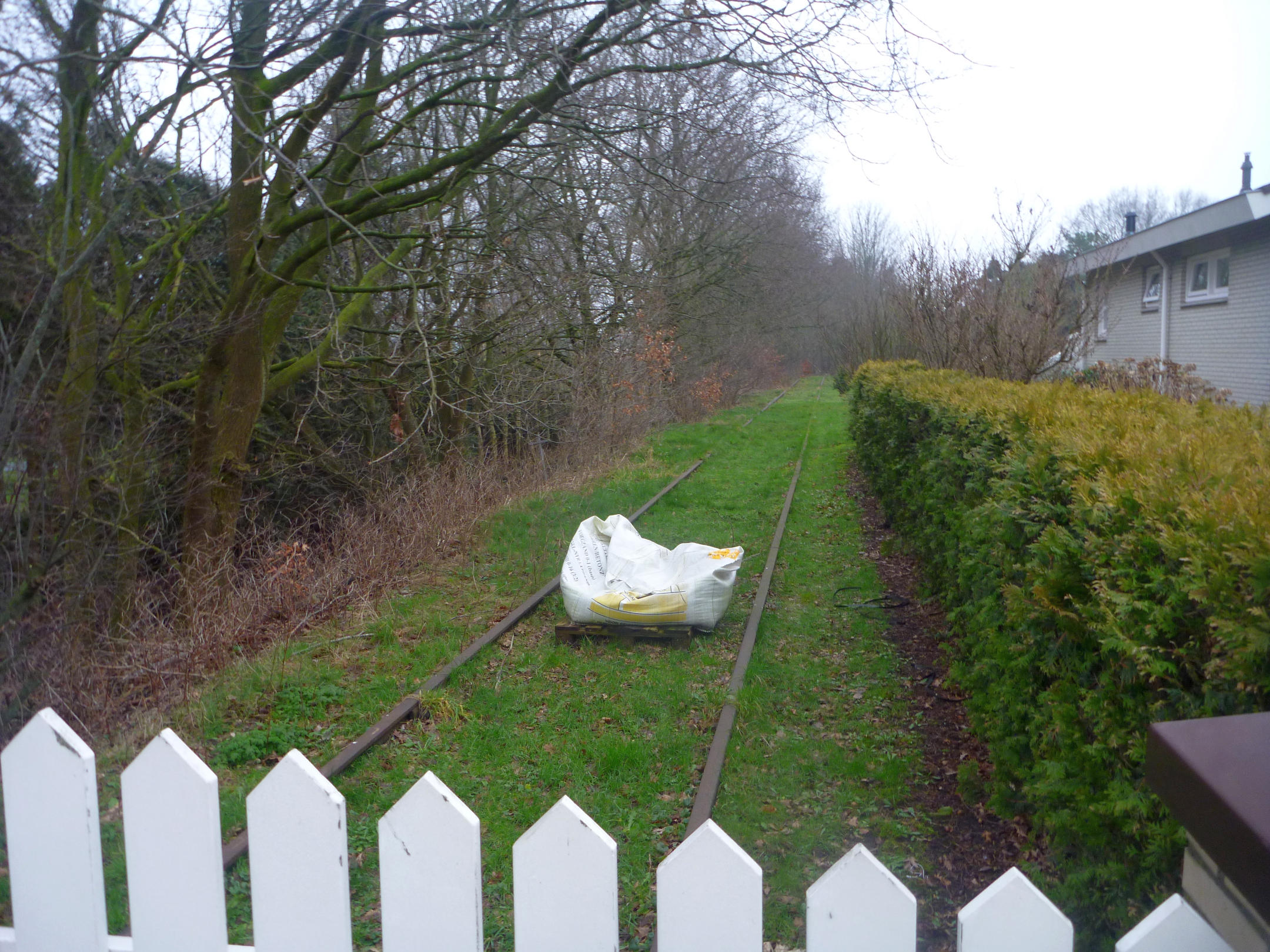
Railway line

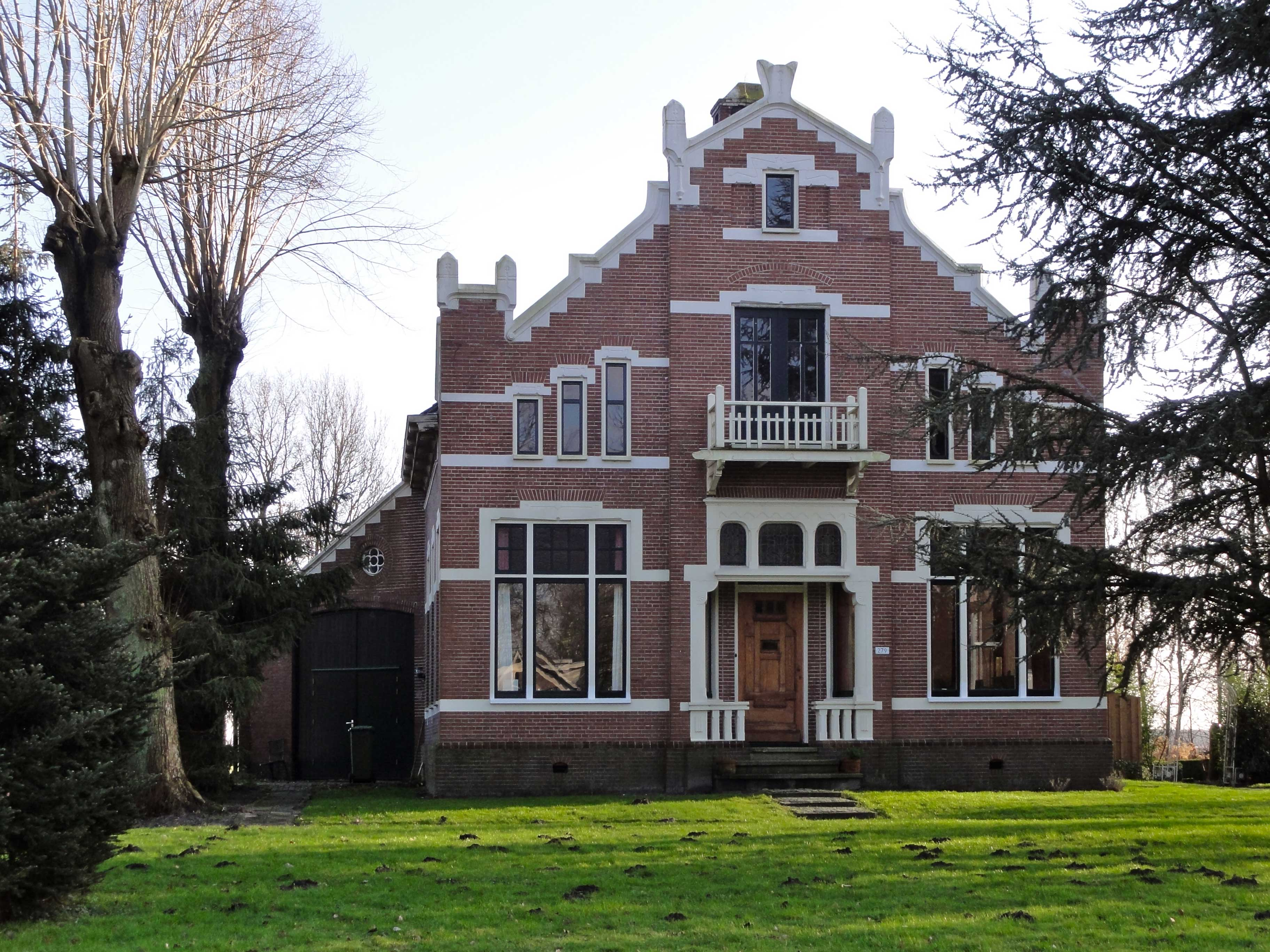
Farm in Valthermond

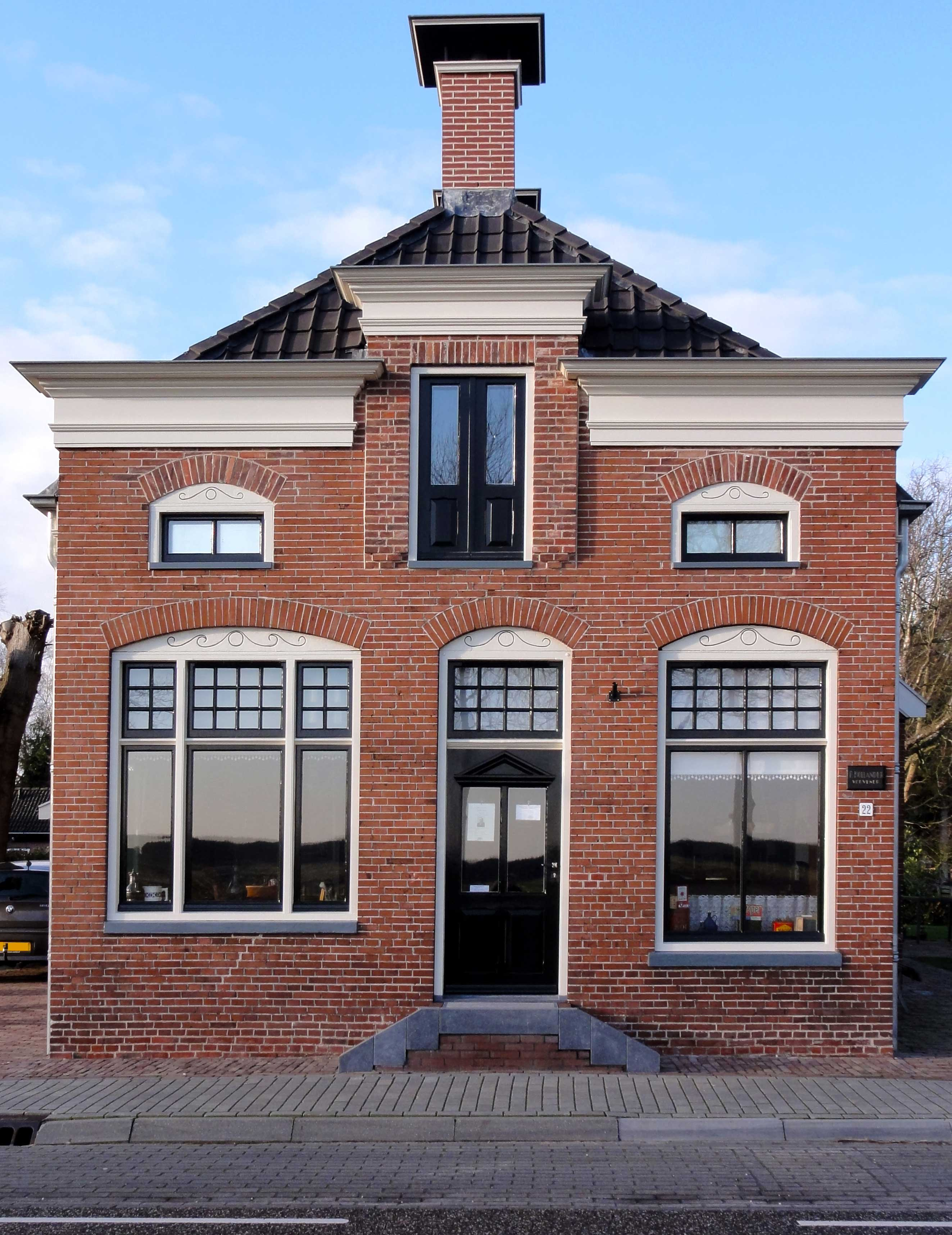
Office and residential home of the peat excavation company
