= 2e Valthermond =

2e Valthermond Tweede Valthermond
- Hamlet
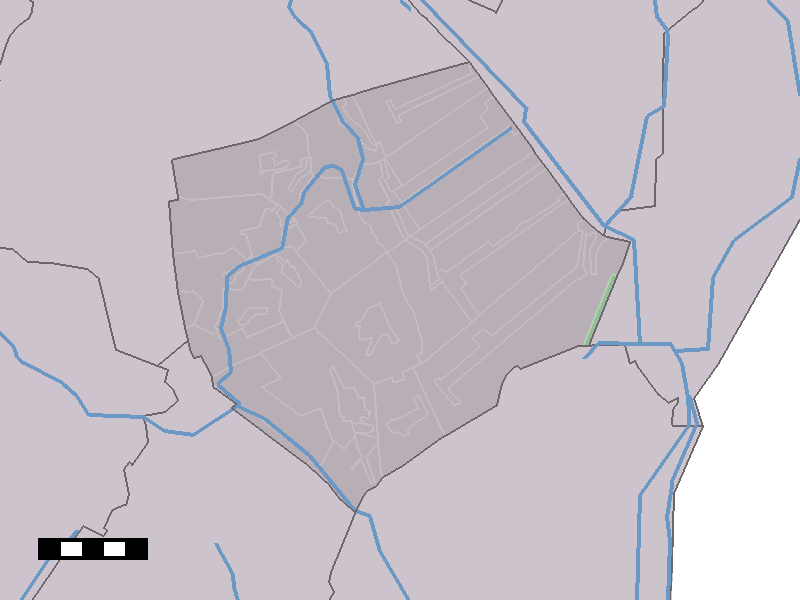
- 2e Valthermond in the municipality of Borger-Odoorn.
- Coordinates: 52°53′35″N 7°1′37″E
- Country: Netherlands
- Province: Drenthe
- Municipality: Borger-Odoorn

Area
  - Total: 5.35 km^{2} (2.07 sq mi)
- Elevation: 10 m (33 ft)

Population (2021)
  - Total: 100
  - Density: 19/km^{2} (48/sq mi)
- Time zone: UTC+1 (CET)
  - Summer (DST): UTC+2 (CEST)
- Postal code: 7877
- Dialing code: 0599

2e Valthermond (before 2009: Tweede Valthermond) is a hamlet in the Dutch province of Drenthe. It is a part of the municipality of Borger-Odoorn, and lies about 16 km north of Emmen.

The hamlet was first mentioned in 1899 as "Valthermond (Noord en Zuid)", and means "the second (canal) which has its mouth (at a main canal) belonging to Valthe". The eponymous canal was dug in 1861. 2e (second) has been added to distinguish between Valthermond. In 2009, its name was officially changed to 2e Valthermond. The canal was dug to excavated the peat from a 7,000 hectares (17,000 acres) raised bog.
