= Pieter Bast =

Dutch cartographer, engraver and draftsman

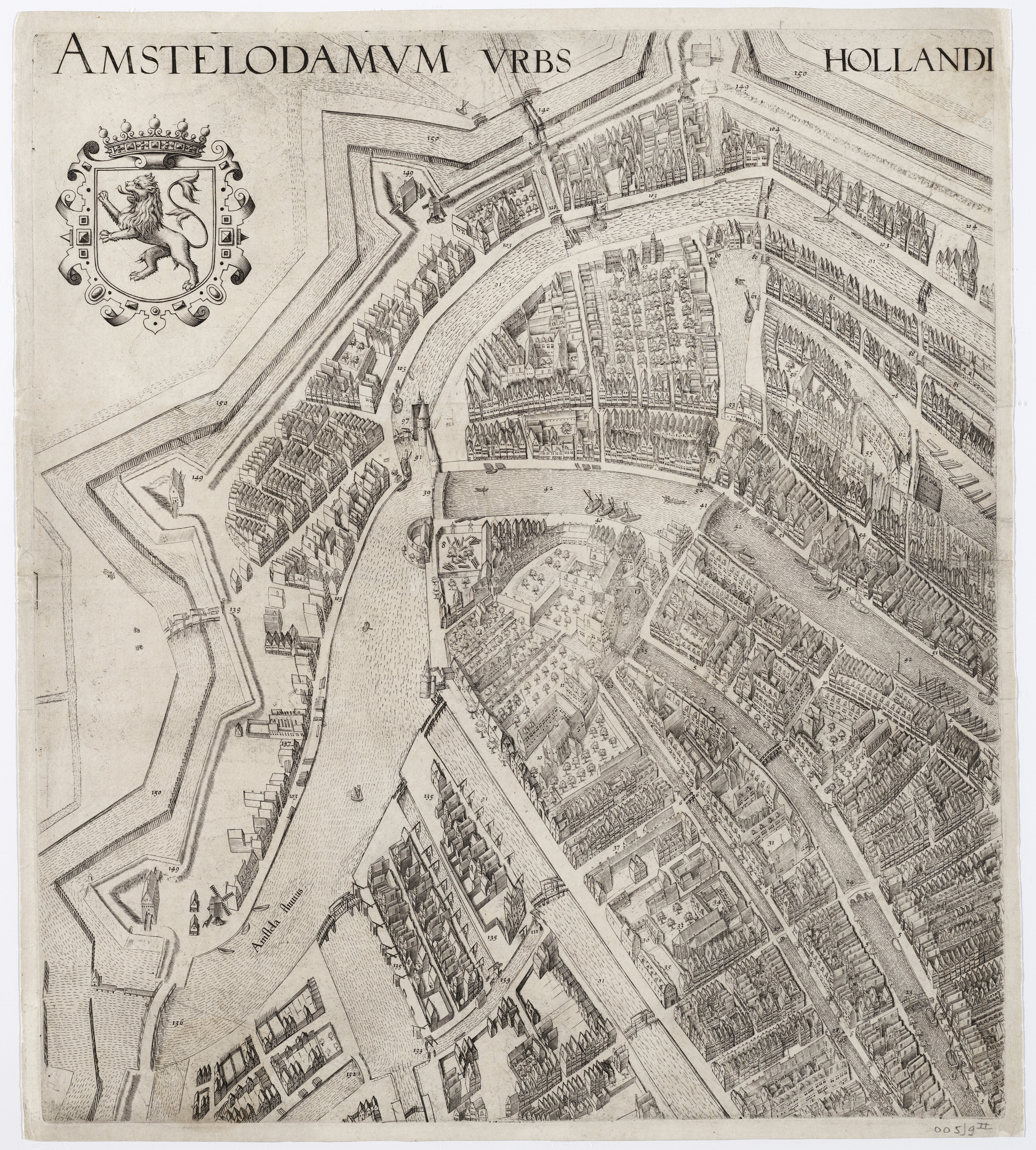
Part 1 of a 4-part map of Amsterdam by Pieter Bast, 1599

Pieter Bast (ca 1550 – 17 March 1605) was a Dutch cartographer, engraver and draftsman.

== Early life ==
Bast was born in Antwerp, and was the child of Josyntje Plantin, who was part of the famous printer Plantin family. On 31 August 1601 he married Aryaentje Geryt Schaecken in Leiden. The following year he bought a house next to the Latin School.

== Career ==
Pieter Bast engraved maps and cityscapes of Dutch cities. He worked on a map of Emden. He also worked as a surveyor. The most famous of his works was the map of Amsterdam that he drew and engraved in 1599. It covered a total of four blades and is titled Amstelodamum, Hollandiae urbs primaria, emporium Totius Europae celeberrimum. Since 1544 there was no accurate city map of Amsterdam, so this work has historical significance. The map was published on 1 October 1599 by bookseller-publisher Harmen Allartz or Alardi. The card was signed Petr. Bast Au (ie auctor) et sculp (sit) et excudebat, 1599, which indicates that Pieter Bast was also editor.

== Later career ==
Pieter Bast made further engravings of Middelburg, Dordrecht, Leeuwarden, Franeker, Leiden, and Utrecht. He also made engravings of historical events such as the siege and the capture of Nijmegen as part of the Dutch Revolt by Maurice, Prince of Orange on 14 October 1591, the Battle of Nieuwpoort. Other artists he collaborated with include Floris Balthasar and Johan Sems. He was buried in St. Peter's Church in Leiden.
