= Ter Apel Monastery =

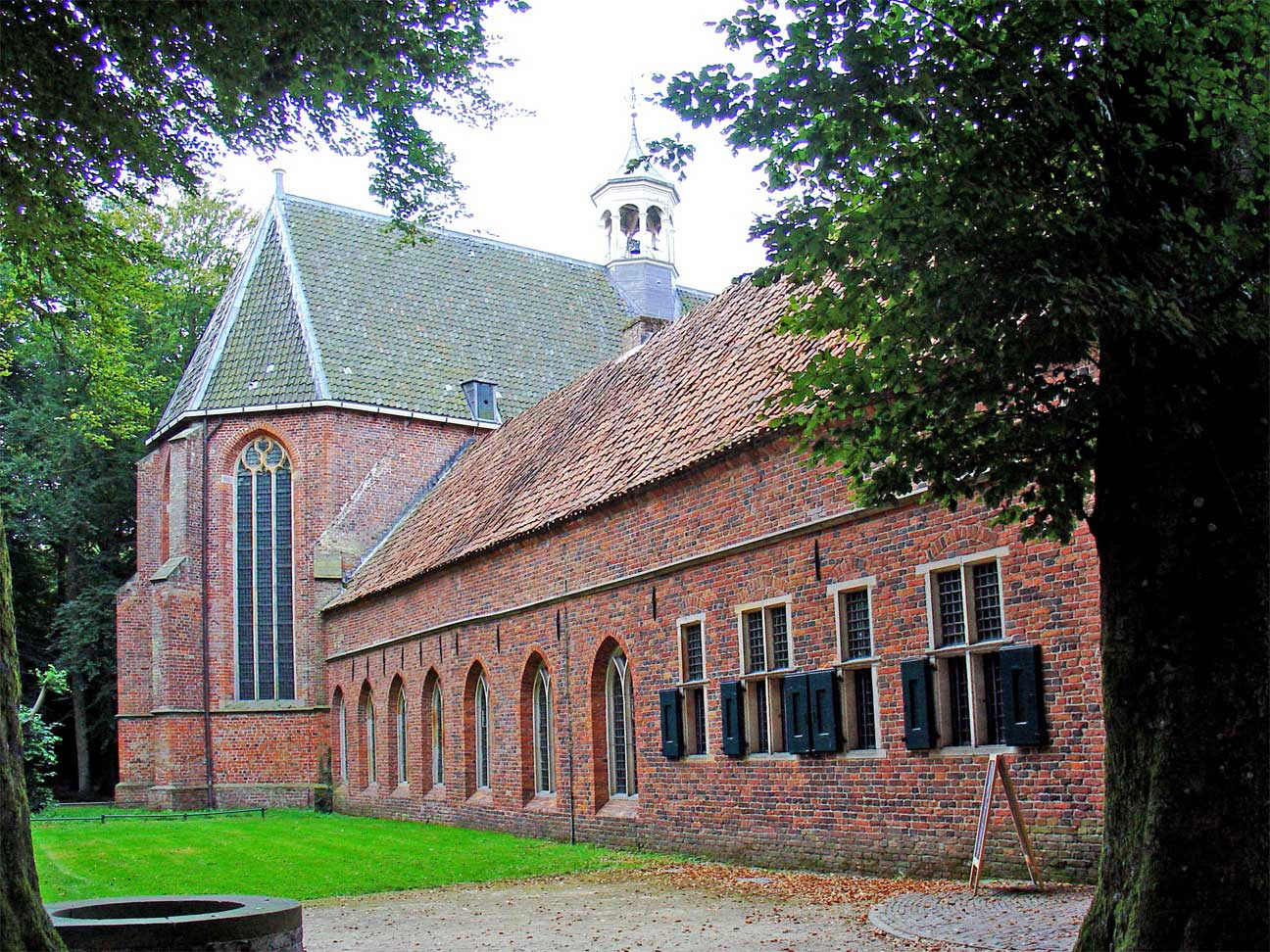
- Ter Apel Monastery, church and east wing
- Interactive map of Ter Apel Monastery

Monastery information
- Order: Canons Regular of the Order of the Holy Cross
- Established: 1465
- Disestablished: 1593
- Mother house: Bentlage Priory, Bentlage, Rheine
- Dedication: Novae Domus Lucis
- Diocese: Roman Catholic Diocese of Osnabrück (until 1593); Roman Catholic Diocese of Groningen-Leeuwarden

Site
- Location: Ter Apel, Netherlands
- Coordinates: 52°52′34″N 7°4′28″E
- Visible remains: East, north, south wings
- Public access: yes

Ter Apel Monastery (Dutch: Klooster Ter Apel) is a former monastery in the village of Ter Apel in the northeastern Dutch province of Groningen. It is the only monastery in the larger area of Friesland and Groningen that survived the Reformation in a decent condition, and the only remaining rural monastery from the Middle Ages in the Netherlands. The convent buildings house a museum for monastery and church history and for religious art, as well as two contemporary art galleries. The former lay church of the monastery still functions as a reformed church.

The monastery is located in the extreme southeast of the province of Groningen on a forested sand ridge along the ancient trade route from Münster to Groningen. For passing travelers and pilgrims, the monastery was a place of hospitality and dedication. Ter Apel is the last monastery founded in Groningen, and of 34 monasteries in the province it is the only one still recognizable as a convent.

== Foundation ==
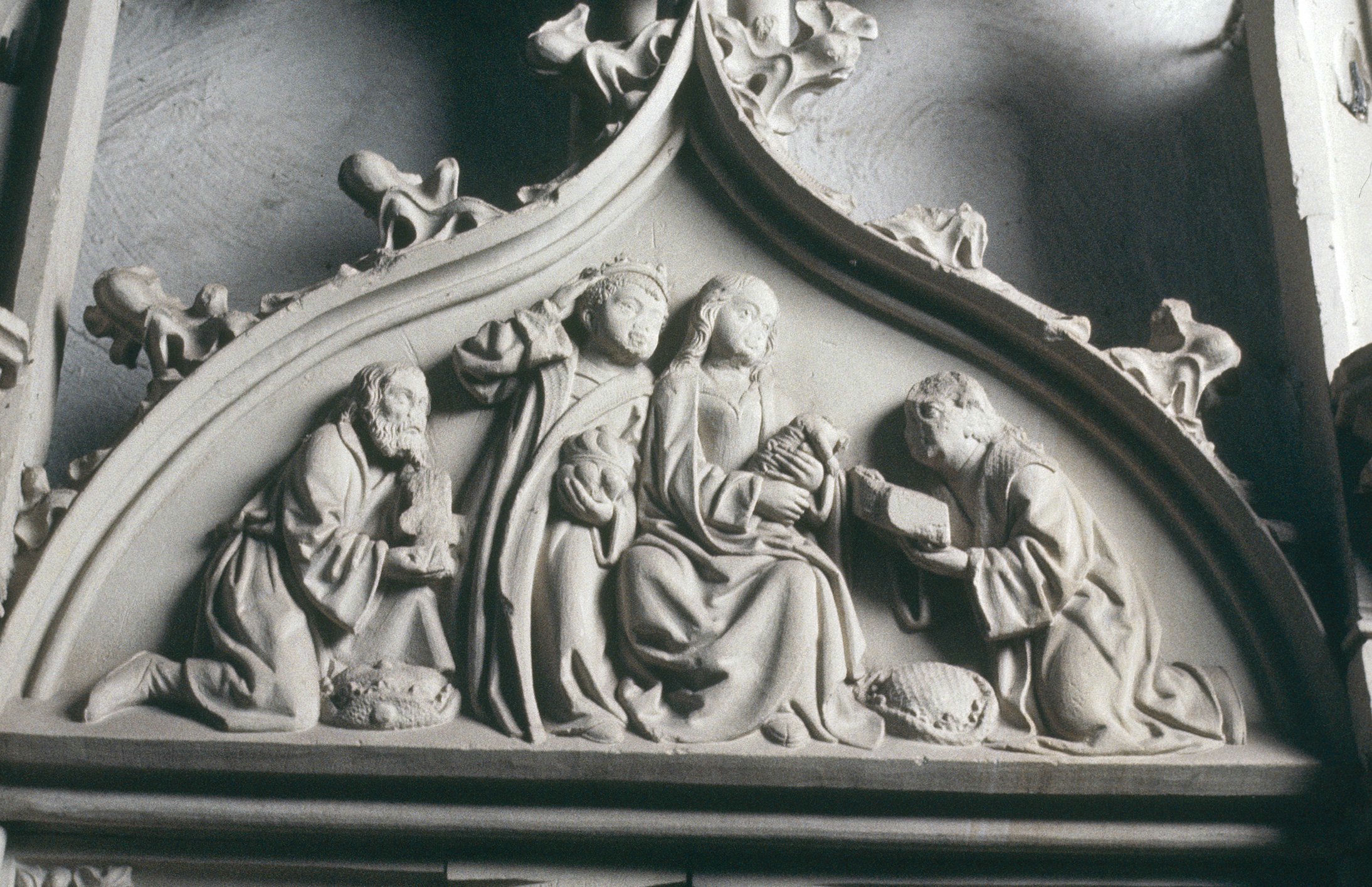
Detail of the sedilia

In 1464, Jacobus Wiltingh, pastor of Garrelsweer and vicar in Loppersum, bequeathed Apell, a settlement among his possessions in the area called Westerwolde, to the Order of the Holy Cross on the condition that a monastery be built there. In May 1465, the General Chapter of the Holy Cross convened in Huy, on the Meuse, and accepted Apell as a gift from God. The monastery dedicated to Saint Gertrude of Nivelles in Bentlage, near Rheine, was to supervise the new monastery, and it sent four priests and several lay brothers to Apell, who founded the monastery and named it Novae Domus Lucis, the "House of New Light." Construction, between 1465 and 1561, followed the medieval plan of the mother in Bentlage, and included, besides the convent building, a gatehouse, water mills, a parchment facility, a bakery, a brewery, and a guesthouse.

The monastery was bequeathed a number of gifts, including a stained glass window in 1561 by Lieutenant Johan de Mepsche and his wife Agnes, depicting Moses and the tablets containing the Ten Commandments. It also derived income from other sources. The grounds surrounding the monastery were rich in loam, which was used in construction; in 1492, an agreement was signed with the adjoining municipality of Roswinkel for the digging of loam, on land leased by the monastery from the hamlet of Weerdinge.

== After the Reformation ==
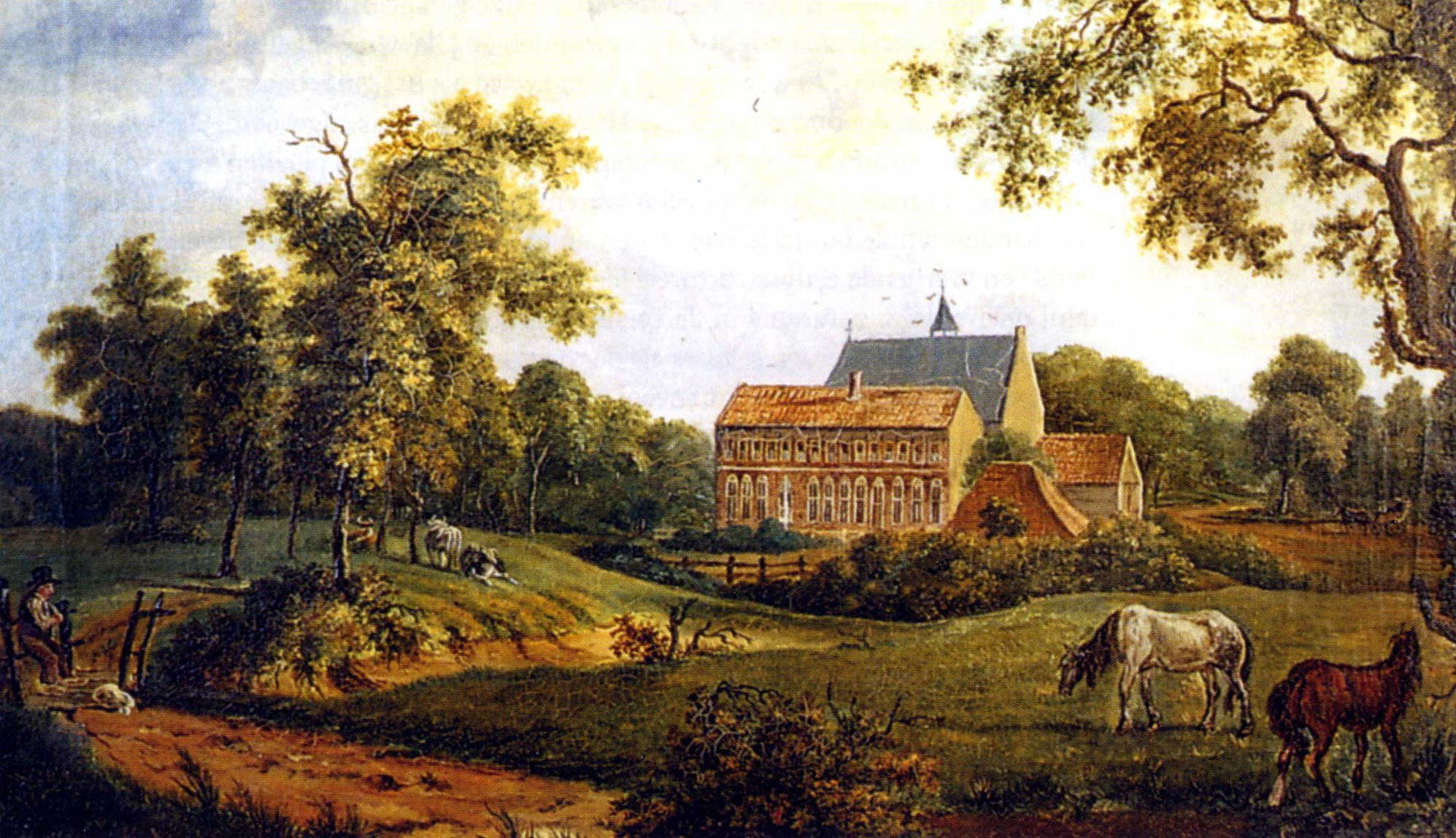
The monastery painted by Arnold Hendrik Koning in 1834

When the area was conquered in 1593 by William Louis, Count of Nassau-Dillenburg, Catholicism was renounced and the convent, with the entire Westerwolde area, became the property of the city of Groningen; the monastery was saved, unlike hundreds of others in the Netherlands, because the abbot converted to Protestantism.

Storms, fire, and high maintenance costs caused major problems in the centuries after 1600. The monastery underwent many changes until 1930. The west facade was demolished sometime after 1755, and so were the upper floor with the brothers' cells (1834) and the dilapidated vaults in the church (1837). Unlike all the other monasteries in Groningen, a large part of the original buildings remained.

== Restoration ==
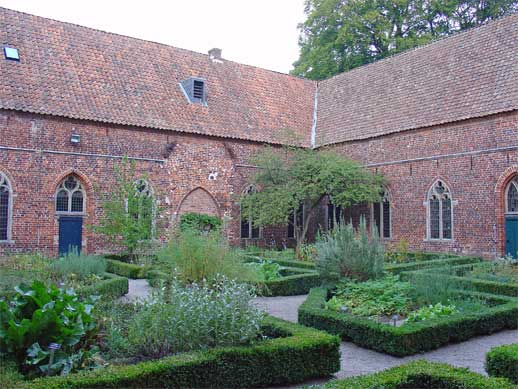
Herb garden in 2006

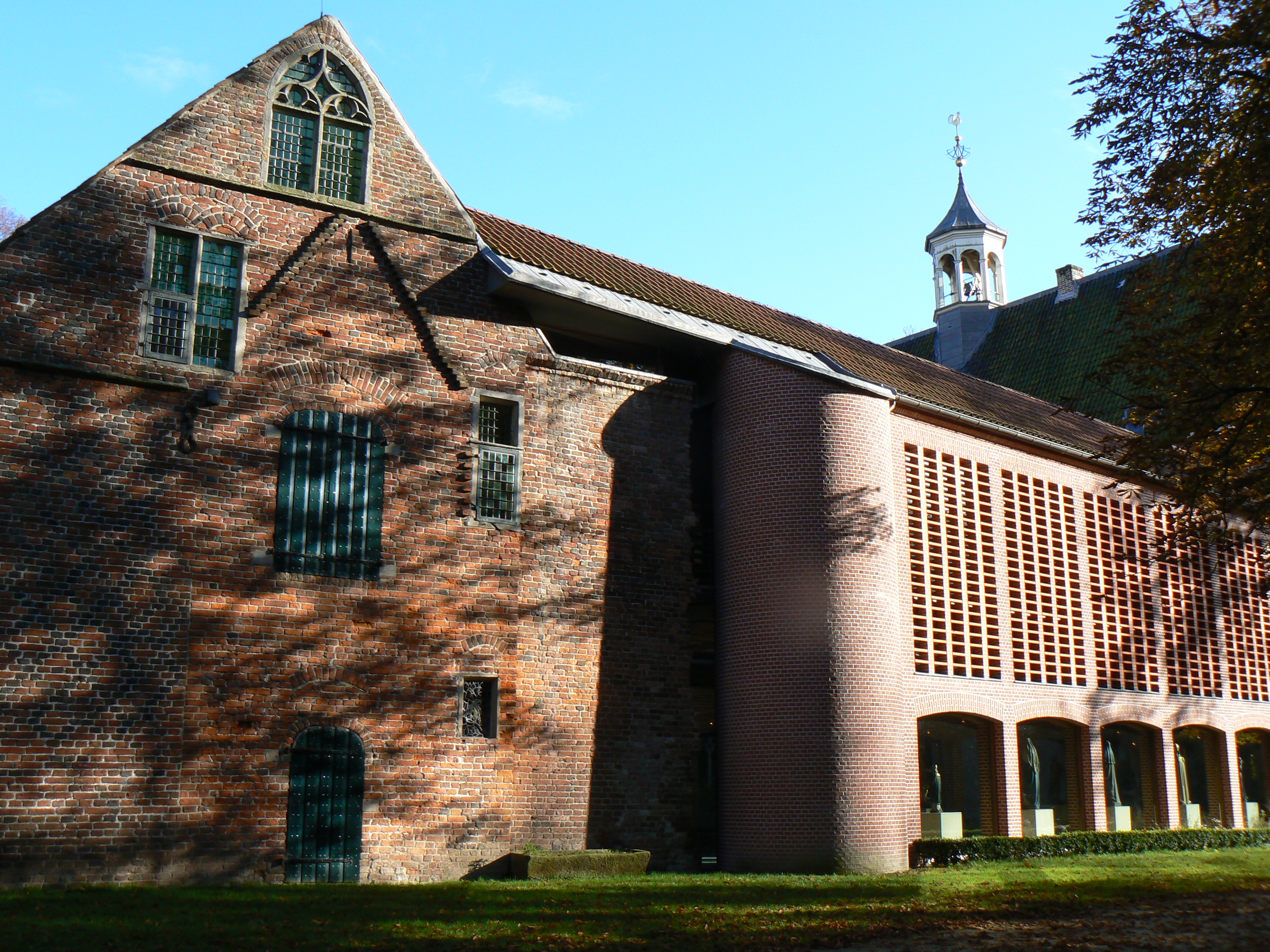
The west wing was finished in 2001

Between 1930 and 1933, on the initiative of the city of Groningen, the remaining buildings were carefully preserved and restored, under the direction of city engineer De Vos Nederveen Cappel. On the ground floor, three of the original four wings were retained: the church for secular canons and lay people in the south wing; the chapter house and sacristy in the east wing; and the refectory (now a cafe), the vaulted supplies cellar, the sub-prior and prior's chambers, and the guest accommodations in the north wing. These wings are connected by an ambulatory, surrounding the cloister. The original medieval cloister garden has been replaced with a herb garden; the location of this garden is the only remaining detail in the Netherlands of such a medieval garden.

Since 1992 Ter Apel Monastery is listed on UNESCO's Top 100 of immovable properties in the Netherlands. In 2000, the construction of a new west wing was begun, designed by Danish architect Johannes Exner; in September 2001 the work was completed.

More renovations took place in 2007 and 2008, with a subsidy from the European Union. The newly renovated scriptorium features an exhibition of books and manuscripts. Also newly added was a workshop for stained glass. The monastery used to hold an annual chess tournament, the Klooster Internationaal Tournament, and continues to organize an annual medieval festival, which in 2010 attracted some 8000 visitors.

In 2009, the monastery began publishing books; the first publication was a history of medieval Dutch monasteries, De Middeleeuwse kloostergeschiedenis van de Nederlanden.

== See also ==
- Crosier Monastery, Maastricht

== Bibliography ==
- 500 jaar Klooster Ter Apel: van metten tot vespers. Van der Kamp, 1966.
