= Passage fee =

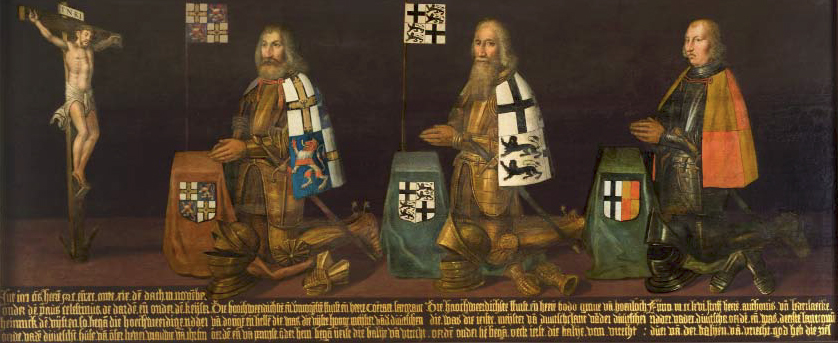
Knight Commanders of the Bailiwick of Utrecht of the Teutonic Order

Passage fee is a donation given by a newly dubbed knight in celebration of his investiture into the knighthood. During the Crusades, passage fees, known as droit de passage, were used to cover the cost of travel to the Holy Land. In the medieval era, the passage fee for the Knights Hospitaller was around 360 Spanish pistoles. The passage fee is still present in some modern knighthoods and damehoods, such as the Order of Saint John (Bailiwick of Brandenburg) and Order of the Holy Sepulchre, and its purpose is used to support the charitable and evangelistic aims of the chivalric orders.
