= Ter Apel =

- Village
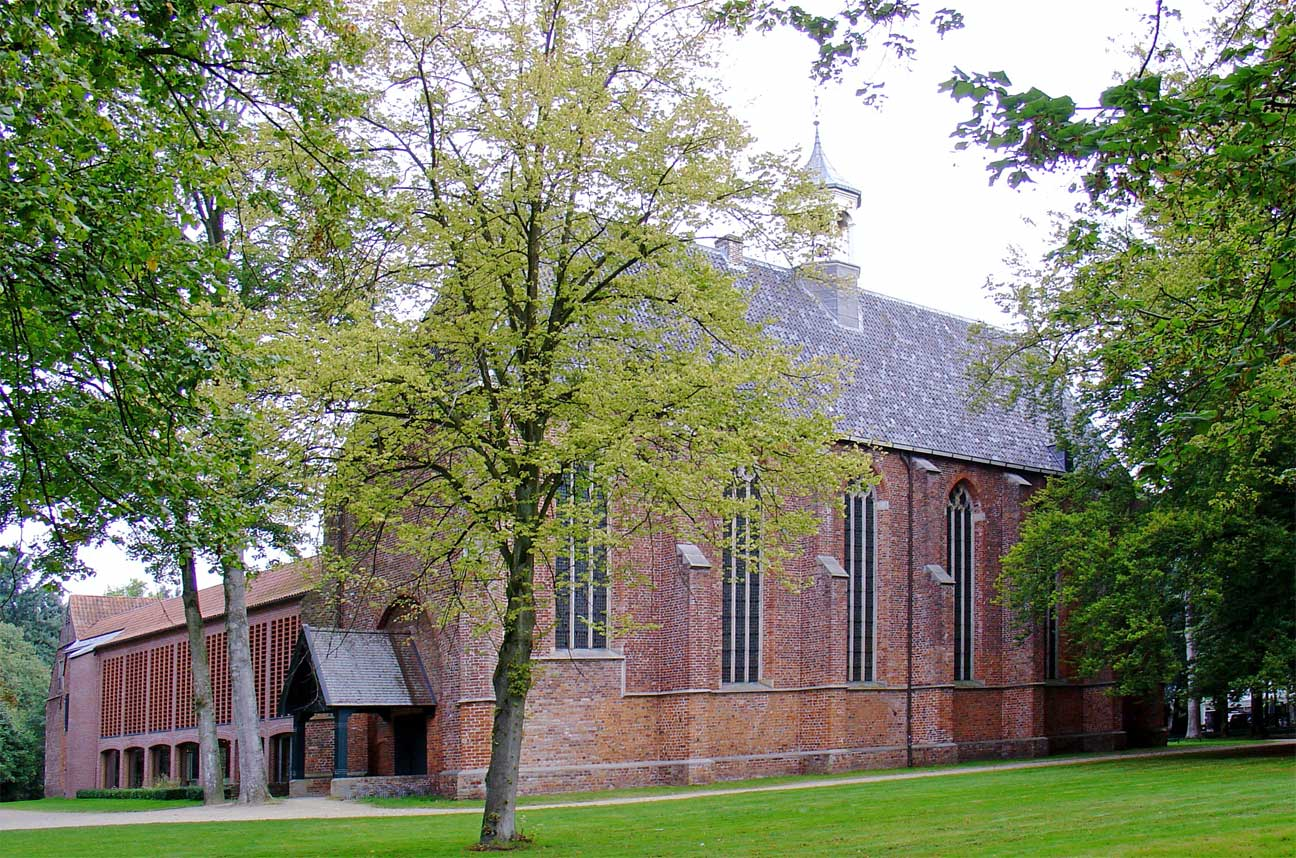
- Ter Apel Monastery in 2008

- Location in the province of Groningen in the Netherlands Ter Apel (Netherlands)
- Coordinates: 52°52′32″N 7°3′35″E
- Country: Netherlands
- Province: Groningen
- Municipality: Westerwolde

Area
  - Total: 0.8191 km^{2} (0.3163 sq mi)

Population (2021)
  - Total: 5,450
  - Estimate (2026): 9,129
  - Density: 6,650/km^{2} (17,200/sq mi)
- Time zone: UTC+1 (CET)
  - Summer (DST): UTC+2 (CEST)
- Postal code: 9561

Ter Apel (Dutch pronunciation: [tɛr ˈaːpəl]; Gronings: Troapel) is a village with a population of 9,914 residents in the municipality Westerwolde in the northern Netherlands, in the province Groningen in the region Westerwolde. The town lies on the stream Ruiten Aa, which has the valley that together with the Ter Apeler forest belongs to the national network of nature reserves, the Ecologische Hoofdstructuur. The Ter Apel application centre is located at Ter Apel, functioning as a "departure centre" for rejected refugees and a registration point, operated by the Centraal Orgaan opvang Asielzoekers. Ter Apel lies on the roads N366, N976 and N391. It forms the southern point of the border between Groningen and Drenthe, the Semslinie.

== History ==
The town was founded at a monastery, which from the thirteenth century was a chief work of the Premonstratensians and from 1465 an institution of the Order of the Holy Cross. It was closed in 1594 due to the Protestant Reformation. In 1619 ownership of Westerwolde passed to the city of Groningen, with the monastery and its grounds included. Over time the city planted forests on these grounds. In 1931-1933 the remaining parts of the monastery were restored. In 1976 ownership of the monastery and the forests passed to the state forest managers, Staatsbosbeheer. The agricultural land was also purchased after 1976.

Since the 19th century, built-up strips have also formed due to Peat production from bogs along the Stads-Ter Apel canal in the direction of Stadskanaal, the Weerdingermond in the direction of Nieuw-Weerdinge, and in the direction of Emmer-Compascuum. In 1916 the Ruiten Aa canal was completed, which as of 2004 is again navigable for recreational boating. In the first half of the 20th century it was a hub for the rail and tram routes operated by the Eerste Drentsche Stoomtramweg Maatschappij (EDS), the Eerste Groninger Tramway-Maatschappij (EGTM), the Dedemsvaartsche Stoomtramweg-Maatschappij (DSM), the Stoomtramweg-Maatschappij Oostelijk Groningen (OG), and the Groningsch-Drentsche Spoorweg Maatschappij (Stadskanaal - Ter_Apel - national border) (STAR). Of these rail lines, in 2005 the aardenbaan in the forests at Ter Apel is still recognisable.

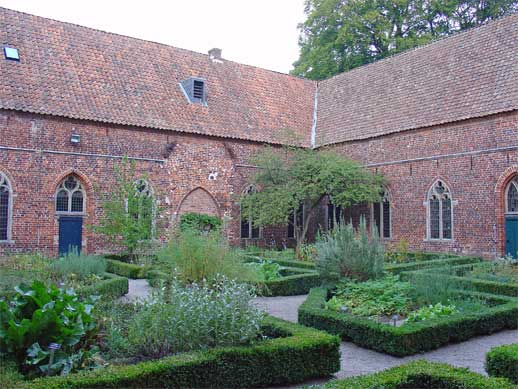
Ter Apel Monastery

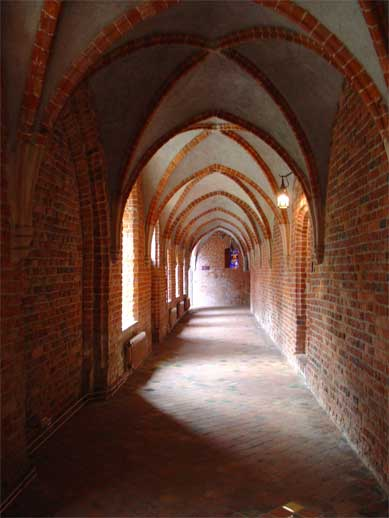
Ter Apel Monastery

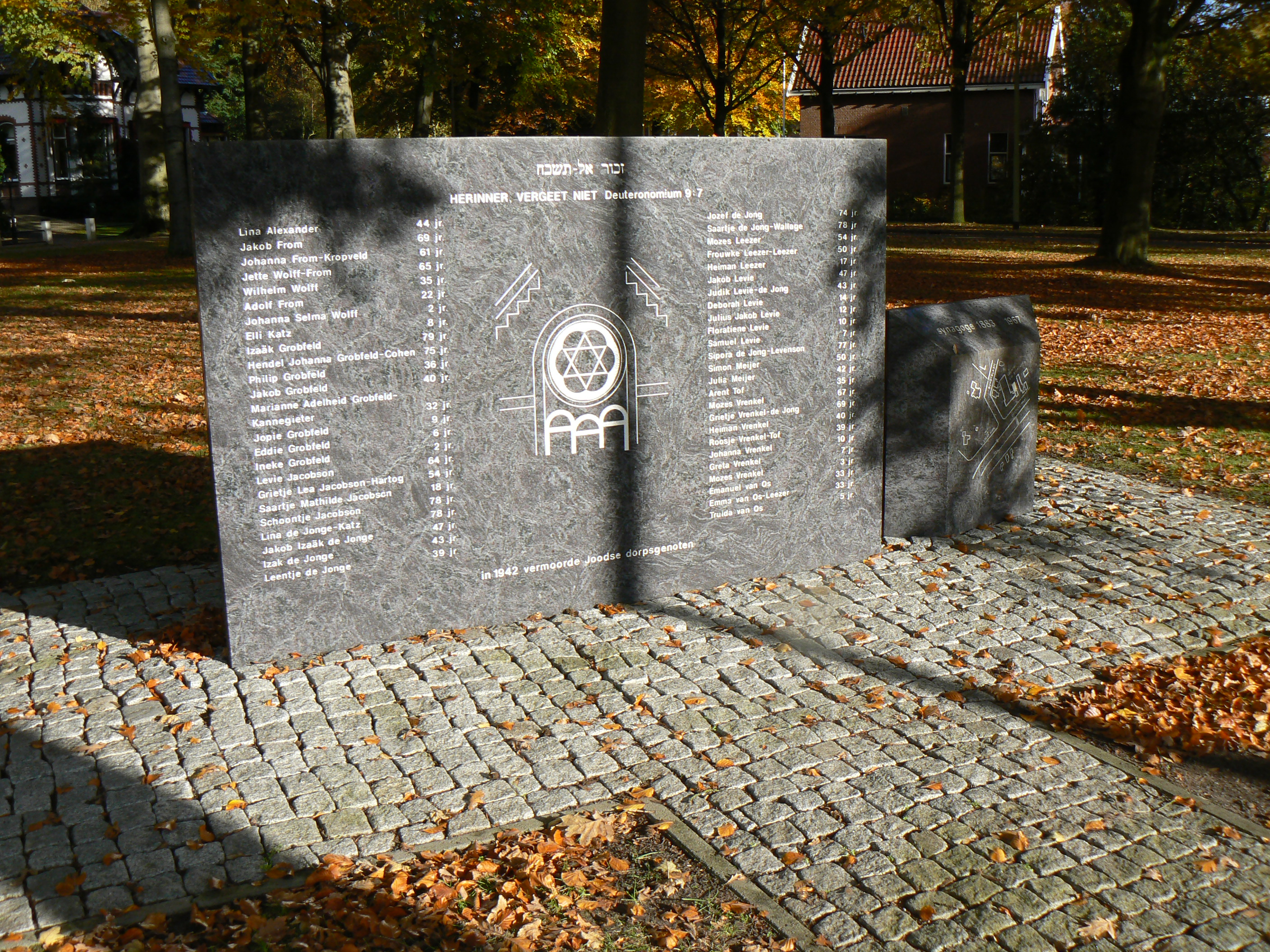
Jewish monument
