= Canons Regular of the Order of the Holy Cross =

Catholic religious order

- Latin: Canonici Regulares Ordinis Sanctae Crucis
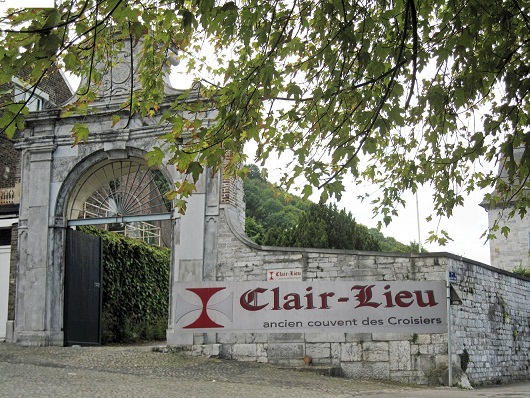
- Clairlieu convent in Huy, Belgium
- Abbreviation: OSC
- Nickname: Crosiers
- Formation: Sept. 14, 1211; 815 years ago
- Founders: Theodore de Celles and Dom Tello
- Founded at: Clairlieu, Belgium
- Type: Religious order of canons regular of pontifical right (for Men)
- Headquarters: Via del Velabro 19, Rome, Italy
- Members: 347 members (includes 227 priests) as of 2020
- Master General: Laurentius Tarpin, OSC
- Patron saint: Saint Odilia of Cologne
Countries present
Austria; Belgium; Brazil; Congo	Germany; Indonesia; Netherlands; United States
- Website: www.crosier.org

The Crosiers, formally known as the Canons Regular of the Order of the Holy Cross (Latin: Canonici Regulares Ordinis Sanctae Crucis), abbreviated OSC, is a Catholic religious order of canons regular of Pontifical Right for men. It is one of the Church's oldest religious orders, and membership consists of priests and brothers who live together according to the Rule of St. Augustine.

== Tradition ==
The Crosiers were founded by five men attached to the household of the prince-bishop of Liege, Rudolf of Zähringen, who accompanied the Emperor Frederick Barbarossa on the Third Crusade (1189–1191). Upon their return, the five, led by Theodorus de Cellis (1166–1236), sought a new way of life, and shortly before his death, their bishop appointed them to be canons of his St. Lambert's Cathedral, Liège.

After efforts to renew the life and practice of the college of canons to which they belonged, the five withdrew from Liège and moved up the Meuse River to a place called Clairlieu, outside the city of Huy, and began a way of life more in keeping with their ideals. This settlement of the five at Huy was the beginning of their Order, and the house and small church dedicated to Saint Theobald that they established there became the Order's motherhouse. Pope Innocent III verbally approved their Order on the feast day of the Finding of the Holy Cross, 3 May 1210, and Pope Innocent IV granted them full and final approval on 3 May 1248 the Feast of the Finding of the Holy Cross.

== History ==
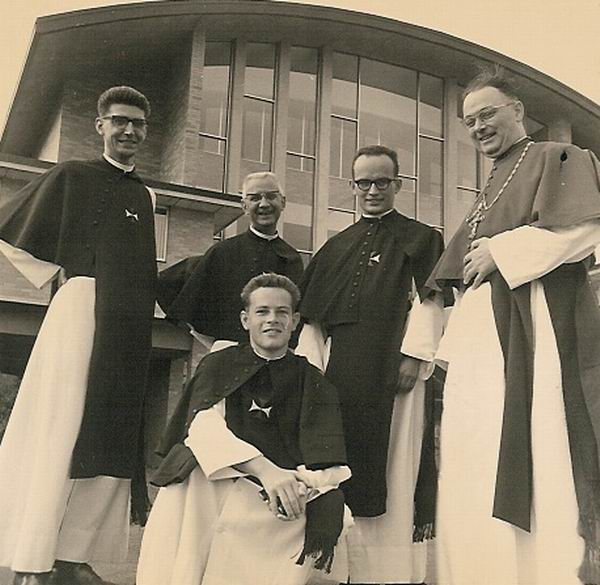

In 1410, the Crosiers' general chapter ordered the destruction of its records and decisions from the time of its foundation. The reason for this radical act is recorded to have been a thorough reformation of some sort, but it left the Order's modern historians with only fragments and clues to their Order's first two centuries, and the tradition summarized above.

The principal source of information about the origin of the order is in the Chronicon Cruciferorum of Henricus Russelius, Prior of Suxy. Their own sources, and mention of them in non-Crosier sources, usually call them "the Brethren of the Holy Cross," and the French and English words used for them, Croisiers and Crosiers, are derived from the French "croisé", one of the words used for a crusader, and meaning "marked with a cross."

Only one of their five founders for whom they have a name is the group's leader, and that only in its Latin form, Theodoricus (or Diederick) de Cellis, which first appears in a short history of the Order published in 1636. While Rusellius does not mention Theodore's parents, there are biographies from the 17th century that say he was the son of Walter de Beaufort and Oda de Celles, guardians of the abbatial church of Celles near Dinant during the latter half of the 12th century.

There is no record of the presence of the Crosiers at Huy until the 1240s, and only in 1322 did Clairlieu become the site of a magnificent church dedicated to the Holy Cross instead of the small chapel of St. Theobald.

The new institution soon extended to France, the Netherlands, Germany, and also to England. Because they were established in the early 13th century, they were contemporaries of the Dominicans and Franciscans, they were frequently misidentified as friars and were often confused with other religious orders known as Crosiers who identified themselves with the Holy Cross. So, for example, there was a very old tradition that Bishop Albert of Prague took several Crosiers with him to Livonia, but these were in fact members of the Bohemian order of the Holy Cross. In England, too, they and an Italian order of the Holy Cross were both identified as Crutched Friars, and so the location of their houses and their activities are often mistaken for each other.

One tradition claims that Theodorus de Cellis assisted St. Dominic in his preaching to the Albigenses of southern France; a Crosier presence in that area is reliably recorded from early in their history. A similar tradition places Crosiers in the train of the French king St. Louis IX of France in 1248 during his crusade; he did enable the Crosiers to build their Paris monastery in 1254.

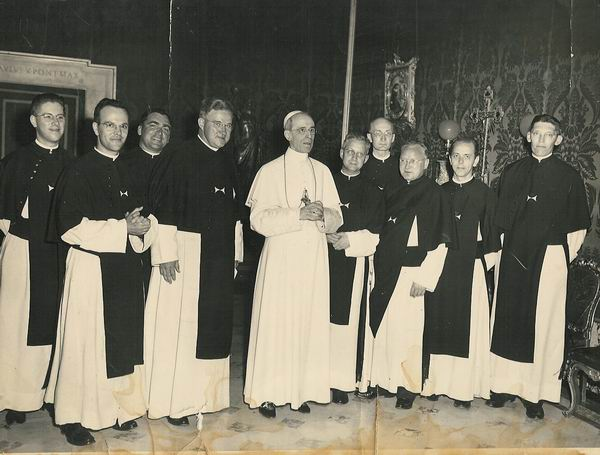
Crosiers from Europe with Pope Pius XII during an audience in Vatican City

The Order flourished in the fifteenth and seventeenth centuries, and at its greatest extent had about ninety houses scattered across northern Europe. But those in England and in parts of the Netherlands and Germany were suppressed during the Protestant Reformation, and almost all of those that survived, notably in France and the Southern Netherlands, including the ancient motherhouse at Huy, were suppressed in the dissolution of monasteries and convents after the French Revolution. In 1794, the area west of the Rhine river fell to France. Along with other abbeys in French controlled areas, the Crosier monasteries were abolished and the monks were forced to leave.

By 1840, only two Crosier houses remained, both in North Brabant, the Netherlands: that of St. Agatha, outside Cuijk, and that in Uden. They seemed likewise doomed to extinction by the decree of King William I of the Netherlands, which forbade religious houses in his realm to admit novices. When King William II lifted his father's ban on 14 September 1840, only four elderly Crosiers remained: the youngest around sixty and the oldest, Father William Kantor, the only Crosier able to remember his Order as it had been before the Revolution. Thereafter the Order slowly began to recover. In second half of the 19th century, the Crosiers returned to their Belgian birthplace, and even made an effort to transplant the Order outside Europe to the United States when their Master General sent some members to Bay Settlement, Wisconsin, in 1857. That attempt failed, however, and it was not until the first decades of the 20th century that the Crosiers were able to establish themselves outside Europe, in the U.S., Brazil, Indonesia, and the Congo. There are still Crosiers in all these places, and the Order presently numbers about four hundred men.

In the United States today, the Crosiers have a conventual priory in Phoenix, Arizona and a filial priory in Onamia, Minnesota. In 2017, these two chapters of the order filed for Chapter 11 Bankruptcy after agreeing to pay $25.5 million in damages to people who were sexually abused by members of the order.

Crosier Father Tom Enneking was elected in 2018 as the conventual provincial of the Crosiers in the United States.

== Philosophy ==
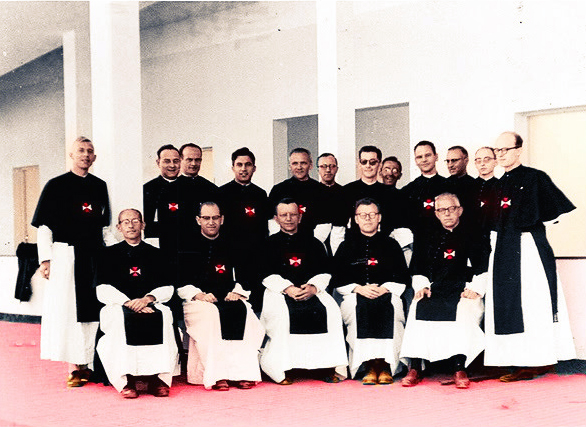
Crosier Fathers from the Netherlands, in Campo Belo, Minas Gerais, Brazil

The Crosiers are an order of Canons Regular. The membership consists of priests and brothers, all of whom live together according to the Rule of St. Augustine. Their way of life consists of three parts: life in a community setting, daily communal celebration of the Church's liturgy, and some form of active ministry. This ministry takes the form of preaching, directing retreats, parish work, education, prison ministry, immigration services and spiritual direction.

The primary feast of the Crosiers, the Exaltation of the Cross, reflects a spirituality focused on the triumphal cross of Christ. Crosiers believe the resurrection of Jesus guarantees that in suffering and pain, there is hope and healing. Because of this, Crosiers emphasize the glorious, or triumphant, cross.

The Crosier habit is also canonical in form. They wear a white soutane or tunic, and over it a black pendant sash, a black scapular and an elbow-length black cape called a mozzetta. Unlike the mozzetta worn by diocesan canons, that of the Crosiers is left unbuttoned to reveal the cross on their scapular, which has the form of a Maltese cross with a red upright and white crosspiece.

The members of the Order usually reside in houses called priories, so called because they are under the governance and direction of a prior whom the members elect. The Order is divided into districts called provinces, which are under the governance and direction of a prior provincial, who is elected by the provincial chapter, the formal assembly of delegates from the priories in the province who have been elected by the members of these houses. At the time of this writing, the Order has provinces in Europe, the U.S., Indonesia, and Brazil. Two other parts of the Order, in the Congo and Irian Jaya (formerly the western part of the island of New Guinea) hold the status of "regions," i.e., have a certain independence from the provinces that supervise them, but have not yet achieved the status of provinces. The entire Order is under the governance and direction of its Master General, who is elected by the general chapter, the formal assembly of delegates from the Order's provinces and regions who have been elected by their members. Priors, priors provincial, and masters general of the Order are all elected for specific terms.

Catholic men who wish to enter the Order undergo a period of consideration and review, after which they may be accepted for a year of novitiate. Upon conclusion of his novitiate, a Crosier is admitted to a three-year period of temporary vows. Thereafter, a second period of temporary vows may follow or immediate admission to solemn profession, viz., vows taken for life.

The Crosiers venerate Odilia of Cologne, one of the martyr companions of St. Ursula, as their patroness. She is said to have appeared to a lay brother of the Order, John Novelan, in the Paris house in 1287 and to have instructed him to go to Cologne and exhume her relics from under a pear tree in the garden of one Arnulf, a prominent burger of that city. After some disbelief and resistance on the part of his superiors, Brother John fulfilled the saint's directions and brought her relics to the motherhouse at Huy on 18 July. The saint soon acquired a reputation as a miracle-worker, and continues to enjoy the veneration of both Crosiers and those outside the Order. There are always a number of pilgrims who come to various houses and churches of the Order on her feast day to ask for intercession, especially against blindness and diseases of the eyes. In response to requests, the Crosiers send small vials of water blessed with her relics all over the world. The National Shrine of Saint Odilia is located in Onamia, Minnesota.

In 2010, the Crosiers celebrated 800 years since their founding with Jubilee celebrations at St. Agatha Monastery near Cuijk, the Netherlands, where the Crosiers have lived continuously since 1371, as well as in the United States, Rome, Indonesia, Brazil and the Congo.

== Crosier monasteries ==
- Crosier Monastery, Maastricht
- Ter Apel Monastery (Groningen, the Netherlands)

== See also ==
- Canons Regular of the Holy Cross of Coimbra
