= Martinitoren =

Church building in Groningen, Netherlands

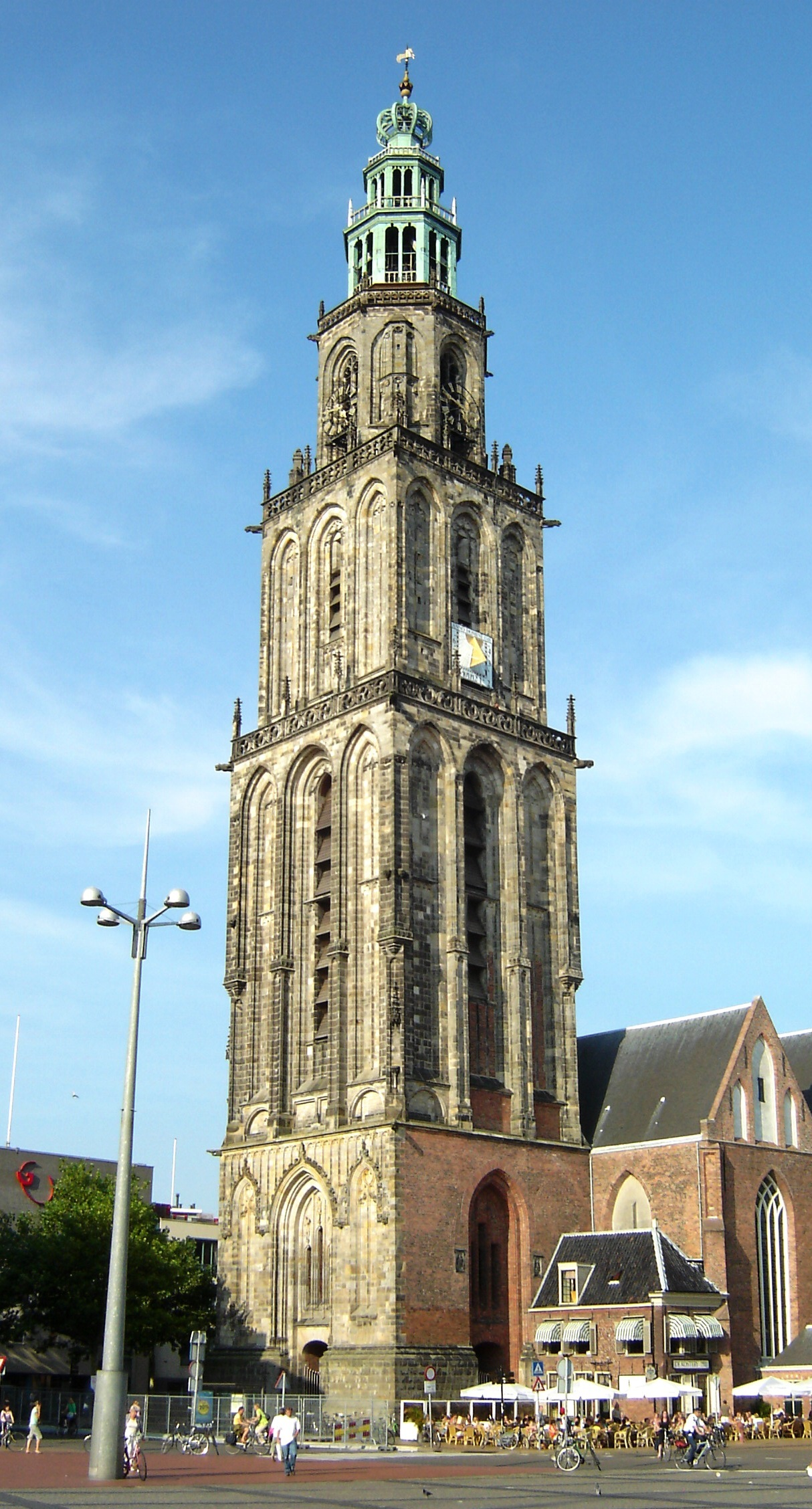
- The Martinitoren

Location
- Location: Groningen, Netherlands
- Interactive map of Martinitoren
- Coordinates: 53.21921°N 6.5680°E

Architecture
- Type: Church tower
- Style: Gothic
- Groundbreaking: 1469
- Completed: 1482
- Height (max): 96.8 m (317.59 ft)

The Martinitoren (Dutch pronunciation: [mɑrˈtinitoːrə(n)]; Martini or St. Martin's Tower) is the tallest church steeple in the city of Groningen, Netherlands, and the bell tower of the Martinikerk.

The tower is located at the north-eastern corner of the Grote Markt (Main Market Square). It contains a brick spiral staircase consisting of 260 steps, and the carillon within the tower contains 62 bells. The tower is one of the main tourist attractions of Groningen and offers a view over the city and surrounding area. The front of the tower shows three pictures above the entrance: the blind poet Bernlef, Saint Martinus, and Rudolf Agricola. All three men are linked to the history of Groningen. The tower is tilting about 0.6 m. According to reports, the tower has a foundation of only three metres deep. The citizens of Groningen call their tower d'Olle Grieze, meaning the old grey one in the local dialect.

== History ==
Twice before a tower has stood on the site of the current Martinitoren. The first was built in the 13th century; this was approximately 30 metres high and built in the Romanesque style. This tower was destroyed by lightning. In the 15th century a second tower was built, approximately 45 metres high, but it also was devastated by lightning in a storm. The third and current tower was largely built between 1469 and 1482 from blocks of Bentheimer sandstone. The steeple was not finished until the mid-16th century. This tower was initially an estimated 102 metres high. Its architecture was influenced by the Dom Tower of Utrecht.

The lighting of celebratory fires on the third gallery, after the departure of Spanish and Walloon troops in 1577, caused the tower to partially collapse. However, the remaining portion kept a height of 69 meters. In the 17th century the tower was repaired up to the current 97 metre height. Later the tower was damaged several times by natural violence and several wars. There is a bullet hole in one of the bells, a result of heavy fighting when the Canadian Forces liberated Groningen at the end of World War II.

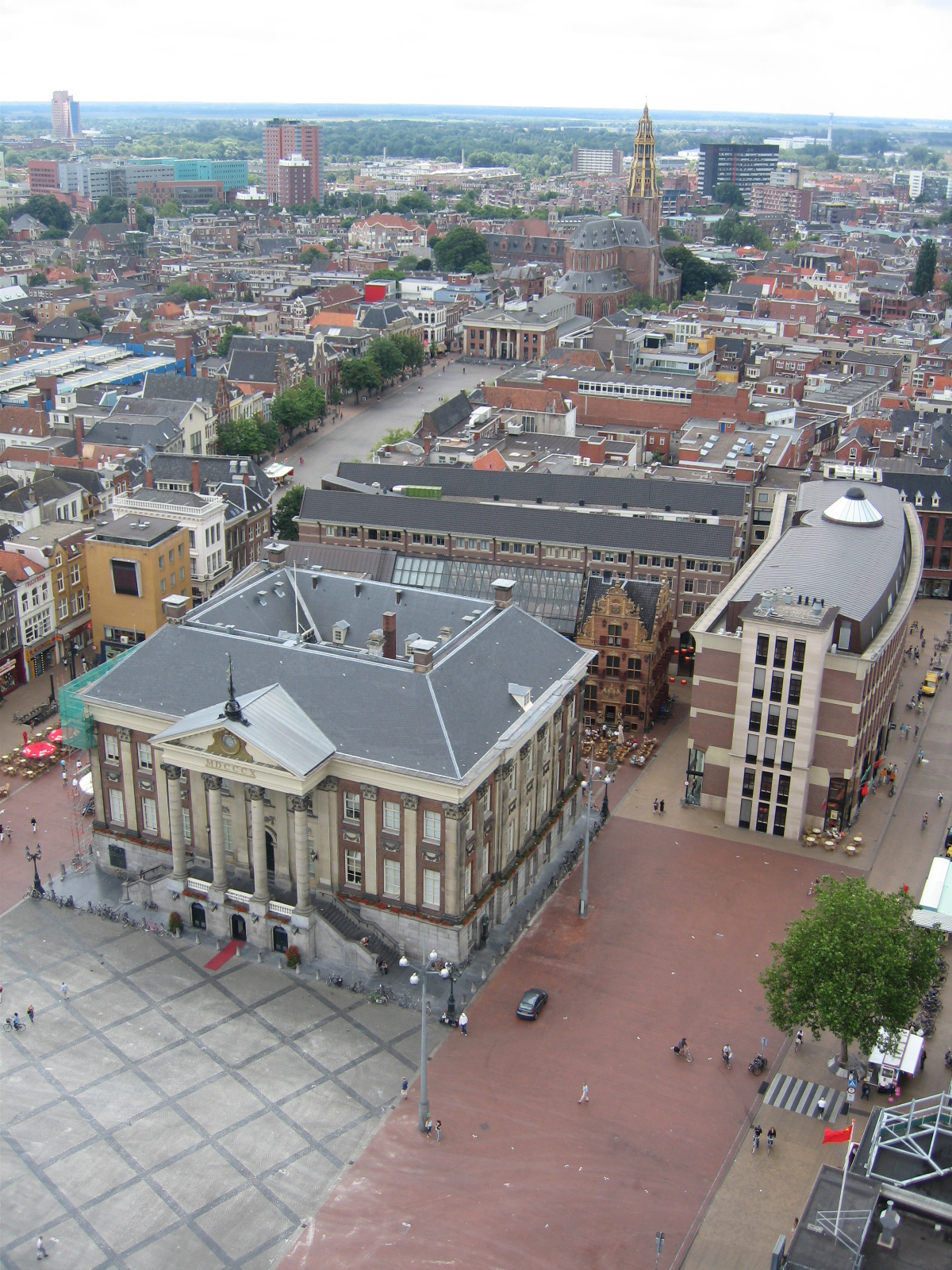
The view from the Martinitoren

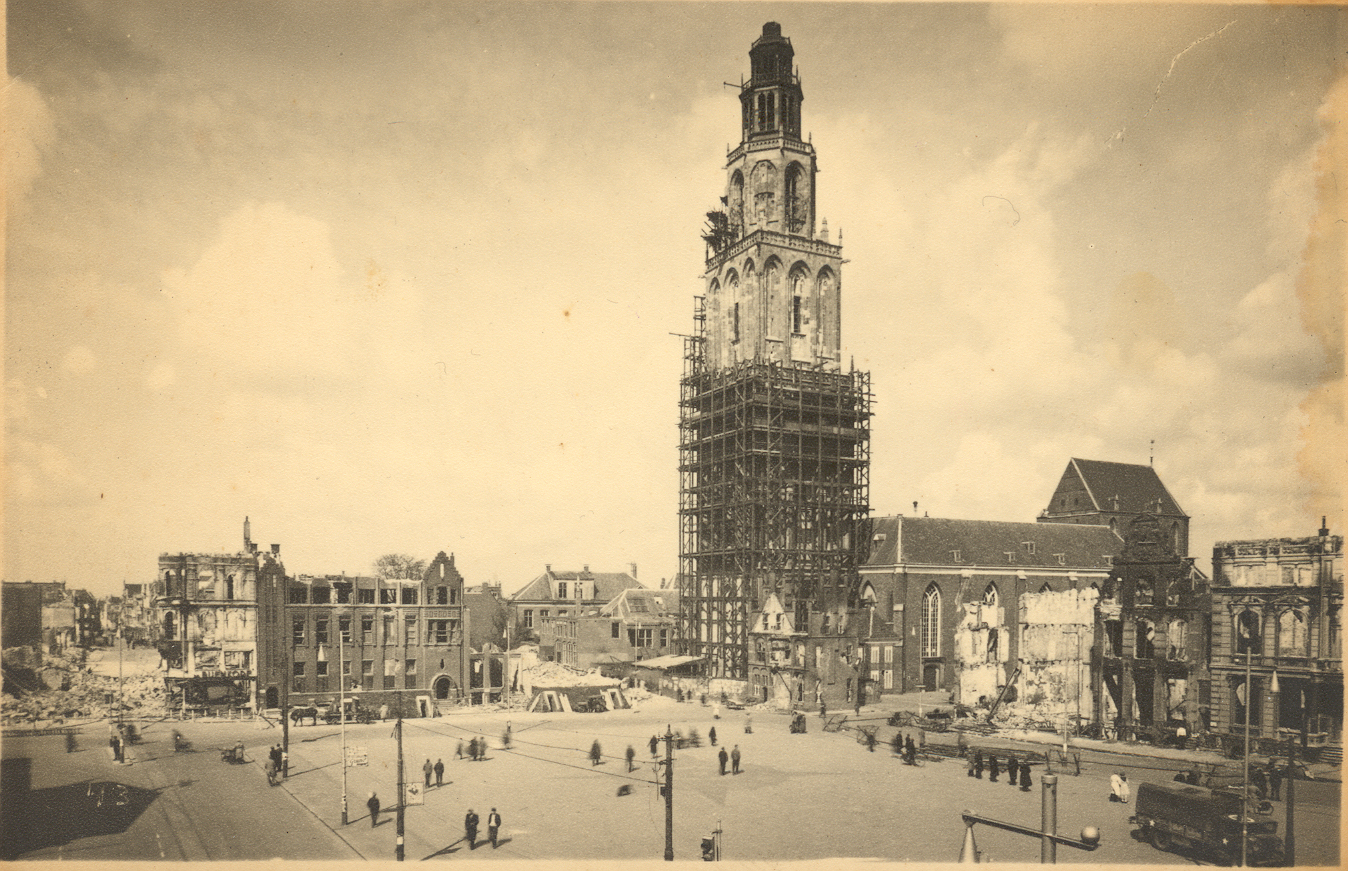
Martinitoren in 1945

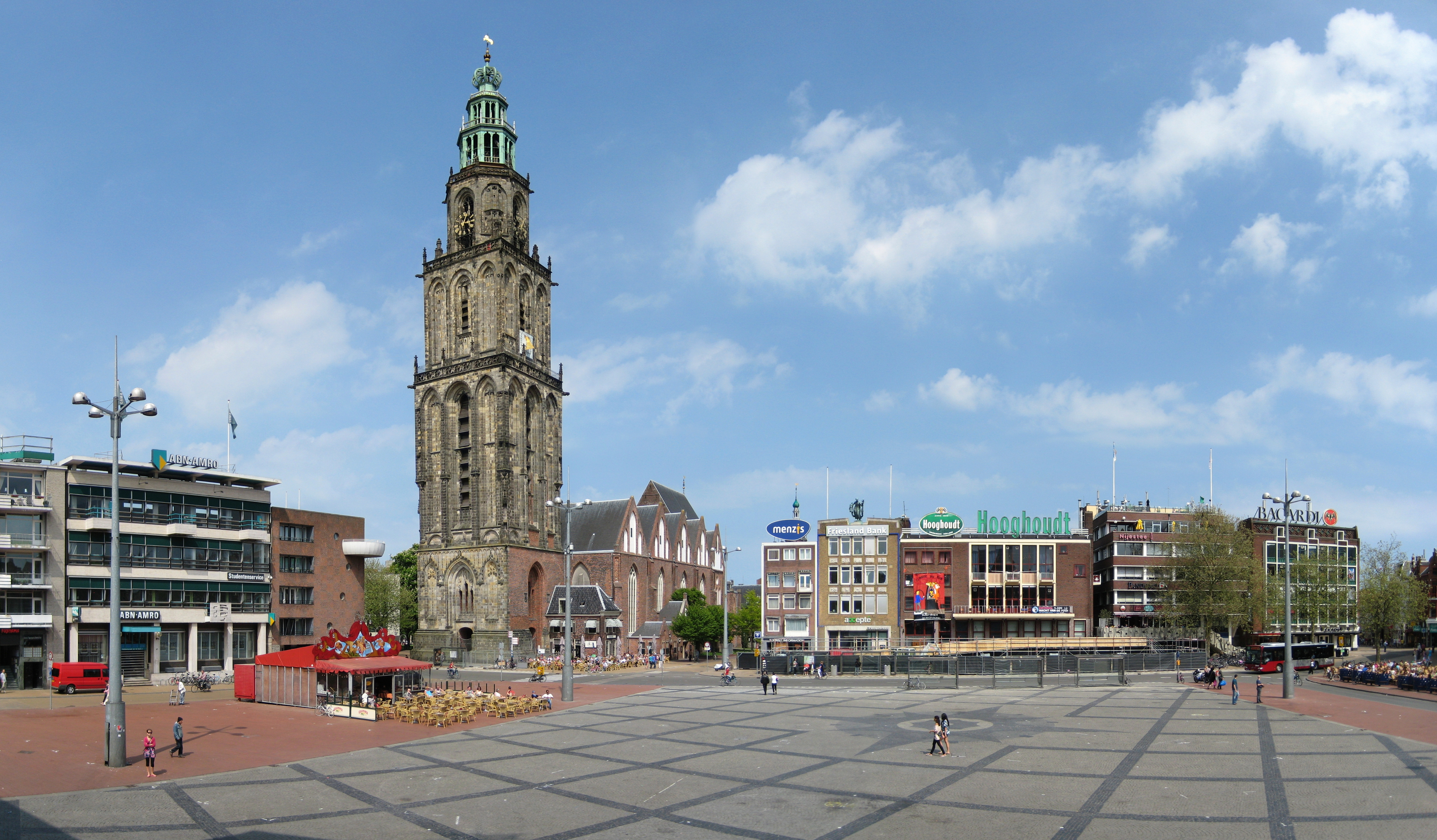
Martinitoren in 2010

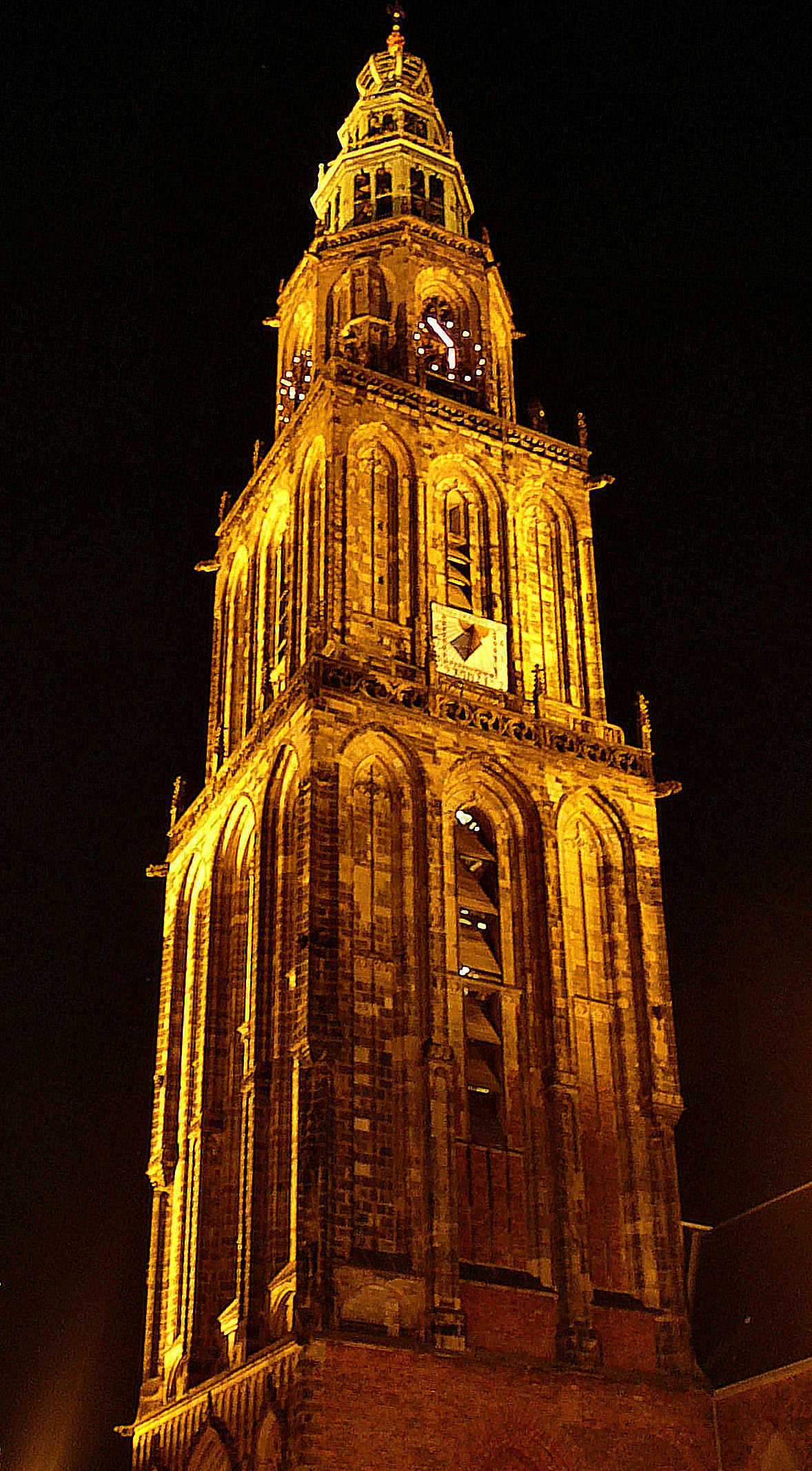
Martinitoren by night

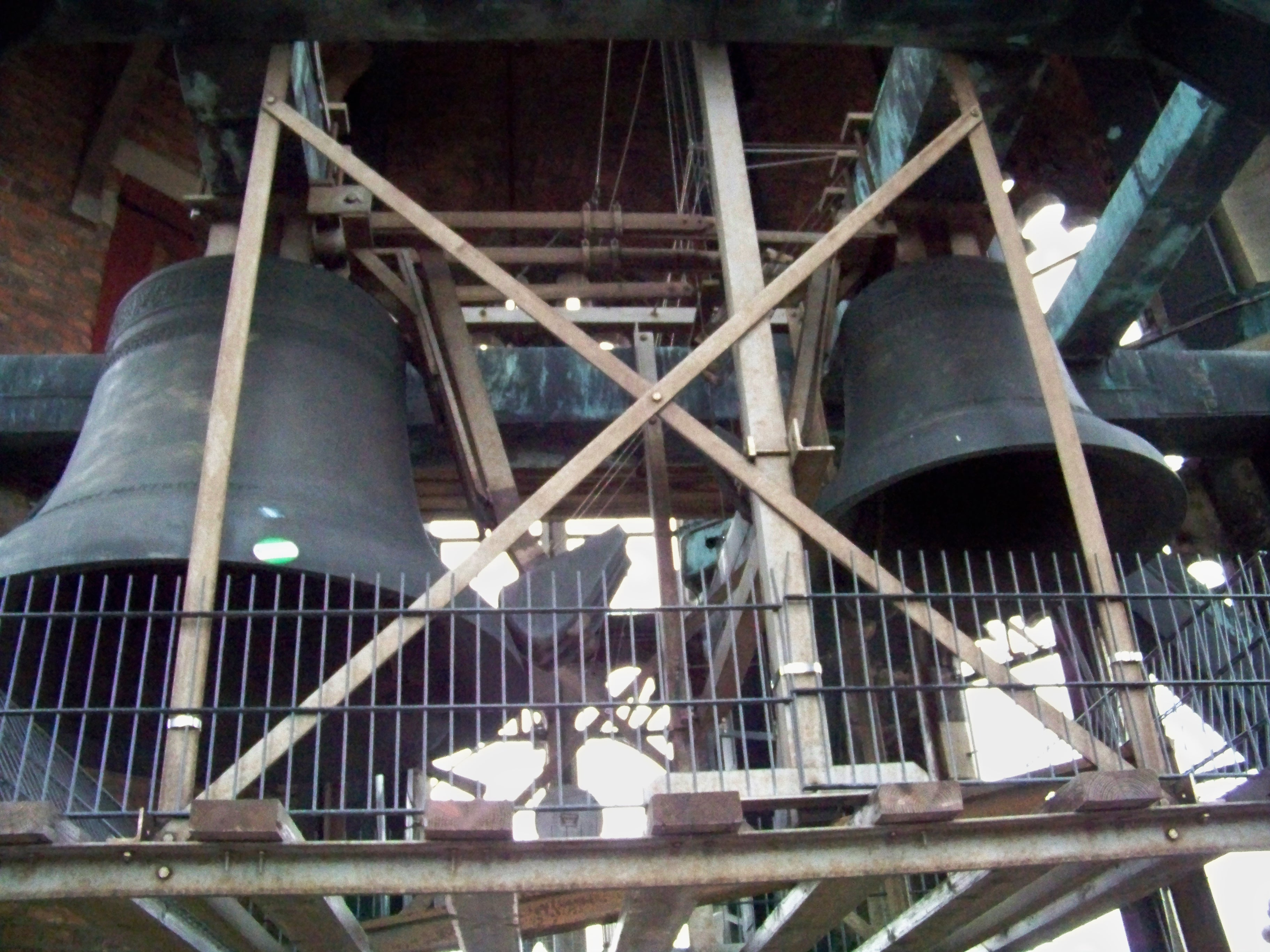
The bells in the Martinitoren

== See also ==
- List of tallest structures built before the 20th century
