= Vlagtwedde =

- Village
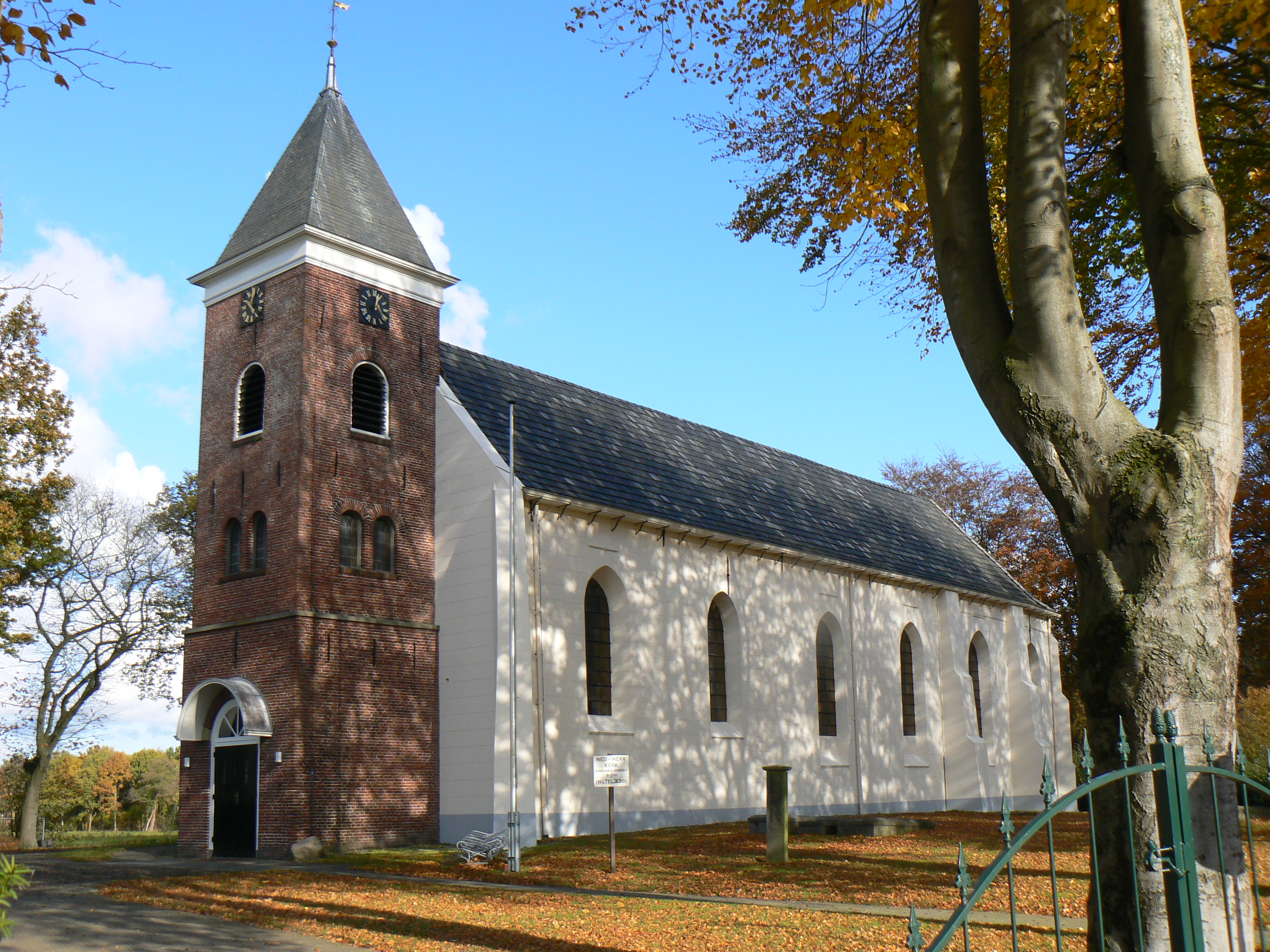
- Protestant Church in Vlagtwedde in 2007

- Location in Groningen

- Location in the province of Groningen in the Netherlands Vlagtwedde (Netherlands)
- Coordinates: 52°57′N 7°9′E
- Country: Netherlands
- Province: Groningen
- Municipality: Westerwolde
- Established: December 1811; 214 years ago
- Disestablished: 1 January 2018; 8 years ago

Area
  - Total: 170.55 km^{2} (65.85 sq mi)
  - Land: 167.62 km^{2} (64.72 sq mi)
  - Water: 2.93 km^{2} (1.13 sq mi)
- Elevation: 8 m (26 ft)

Population (January 2021)
  - Total: data missing
- Demonym: Vlagtwedder
- Time zone: UTC+1 (CET)
  - Summer (DST): UTC+2 (CEST)
- Postcode: 9540–9564
- Area code: 0599
- Website: www.vlagtwedde.nl

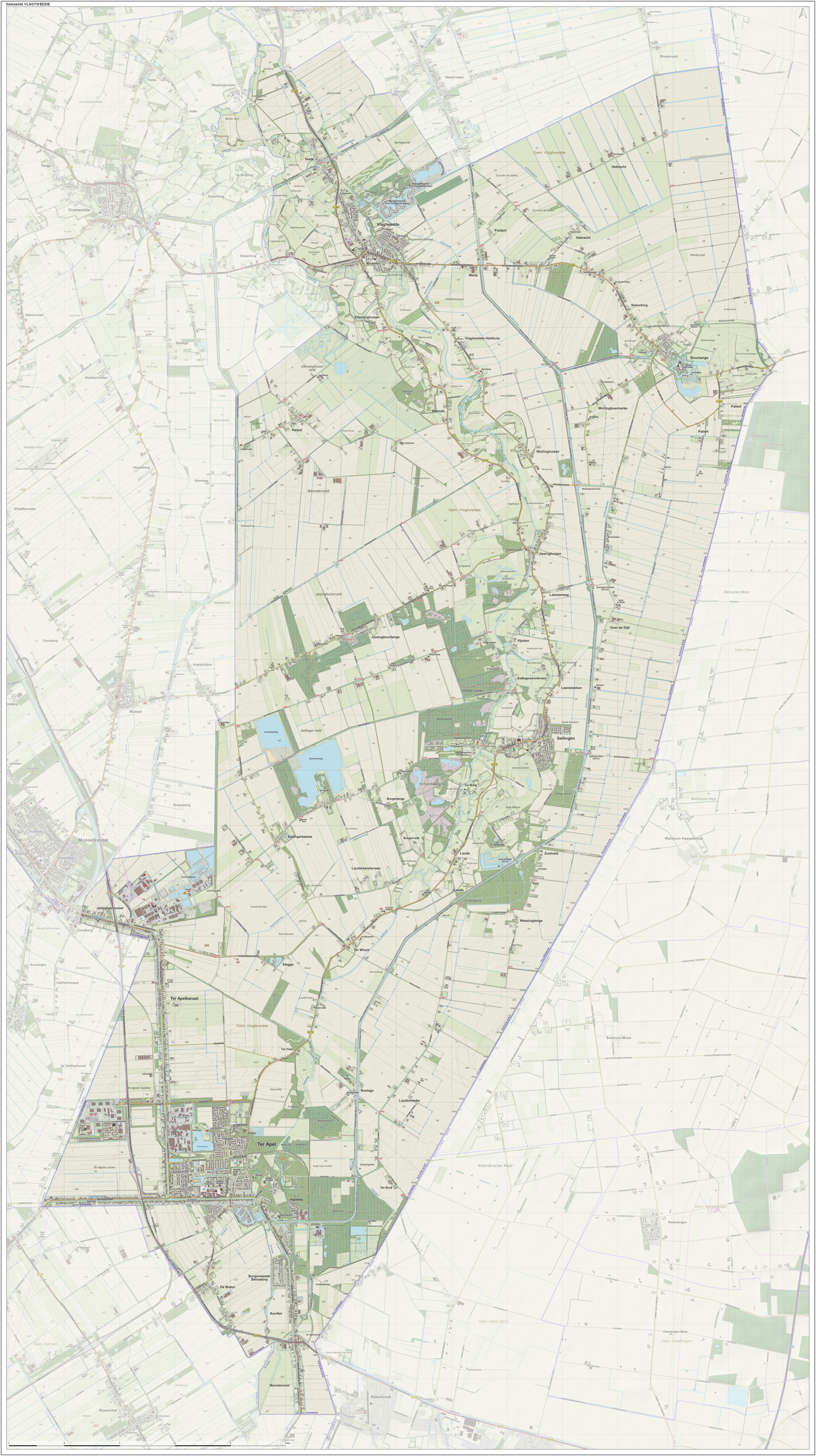
Map of Vlagtwedde, June 2015

Vlagtwedde (Dutch: [vlɑxtˈʋɛdə]) is a village in the very southeast of Groningen province in the northeastern Netherlands. It lies on the Dutch border with the German state of Lower Saxony to the east.

== History ==
The municipality of Vlagtwedde was created in December 1811.

On 1 January 2018, the municipality of Vlagtwedde was merged with Bellingwedde to form the new municipality of Westerwolde.

== Geography ==
The population centres in the municipality of Vlagtwedde were:

Abeltjeshuis, Bakovensmee, Barnflair, Borgertange, Borgerveld, Bourtange, Burgemeester Beinsdorp, De Bruil, Ellersinghuizen, Hanetange, Harpel, Hasseberg, Hebrecht, 't Heem, Jipsingboermussel, Jipsingboertange, Jipsinghuizen, Lammerweg, Laude, Lauderbeetse, Laudermarke, Lauderzwarteveen, Leemdobben, Maten, Munnekemoer, Over de Dijk, Overdiep, Pallert, Plaggenborg, Poldert, Renneborg, Rhederveld, Rijsdam, Roelage, 't Schot, Sellingen, Sellingerbeetse, Sellingerzwarteveen, Slegge, Stakenborg, Stobben, Ter Apel, Ter Apelkanaal, Ter Borg, Ter Haar, Ter Walslage, Ter Wisch, Veele, Veerste Veldhuis, Vlagtwedde, Vlagtwedder-Barlage, Vlagtwedder-Veldhuis, Weende, Weenderveld, Weite, Wessingtange, Wollingboermarke, Wollinghuizen, Zandberg and Zuidveld.

Because of the large number of official centres, the municipality had five postal codes:

- 9541 Vlagtwedde
- 9545 Bourtange
- 9551 Sellingen
- 9561 Ter Apel
- 9563 Ter Apelkanaal

All 60 villages and hamlets in the municipality received their own town sign in 2008.

== Politics ==
The municipal council of Vlagtwedde had 17 seats. The table below gives results since 2002.

Council seats
Party	2002	2006	2010	2014
Local municipal interests	3	4	5	5
CDA	5	3	3	4
PvdA	4	6	4	3
VVD	3	2	2	1
GreenLeft	1	1	2	1
ChristianUnion	1	1	1	1
Party for the Animals	0	0	0	1
D66	0	0	0	1
Total	17	17	17	17

There was an election in November 2017 for the council of the new merged Westerwolde municipality that commenced work on 1 January 2018, replacing Vlagtwedde council.

== Public transport ==
Vlagtwedde is served by several bus lines:

- line 14: Stadskanaal-Alteveer-Vlagtwedde-Veele-Blijham-Winschoten
- line 42: Emmen-Emmer Compascuum-Ter Apel-Sellingen-Vlagtwedde
- line 72: Vlagtwedde-Bourtange
- line 73: Emmen-Nieuw Weerdinge-Ter Apel-Ter Apelkanaal-Zandberg-Musselkanaal-Stadskanaal-Hoogezand-Groningen
- buurtbus (community volunteer-driven bus) 92: Stadskanaal-Mussel-Jipsingbourtange-Jipsinghuizen-Sellingen

== International relations ==
Vlagtwedde is twinned with:

- Międzyrzecz, Poland
