= Burgemeester Beinsdorp =

- Hamlet
- Location in the province of Groningen in the Netherlands Burgemeester Beinsdorp (Netherlands)
- Coordinates: 52.86098°N 7.07790°E
- Country: Netherlands
- Province: Groningen
- Municipality: Westerwolde

Area
  - Total: 0.20 km^{2} (0.077 sq mi)
- Elevation: 12 m (39 ft)

Population (2021)
  - Total: 340
  - Density: 1,700/km^{2} (4,400/sq mi)
- Time zone: UTC+1 (CET)
  - Summer (DST): UTC+2 (CEST)
- Postal code: 9561
- Dialing code: 0597

Burgemeester Beinsdorp is a hamlet in the Dutch province of Groningen. It is a part of the municipality of Westerwolde, and lies about 15 km northeast of Emmen.

The hamlet was first mentioned in 1975 as Burgemeester Beinsdorp. It is named after Fredrik Adolf Beins who was mayor of Vlagtwedde between 1922 and 1946.

The hamlet is considered part of Ter Apel, however it is outside of the main settlement. Construction in Burgemeester Beinsdorp started in 1925 to rehouse people who lived in condemned buildings, living van and house boats.
