= Ellersinghuizen =

- Hamlet
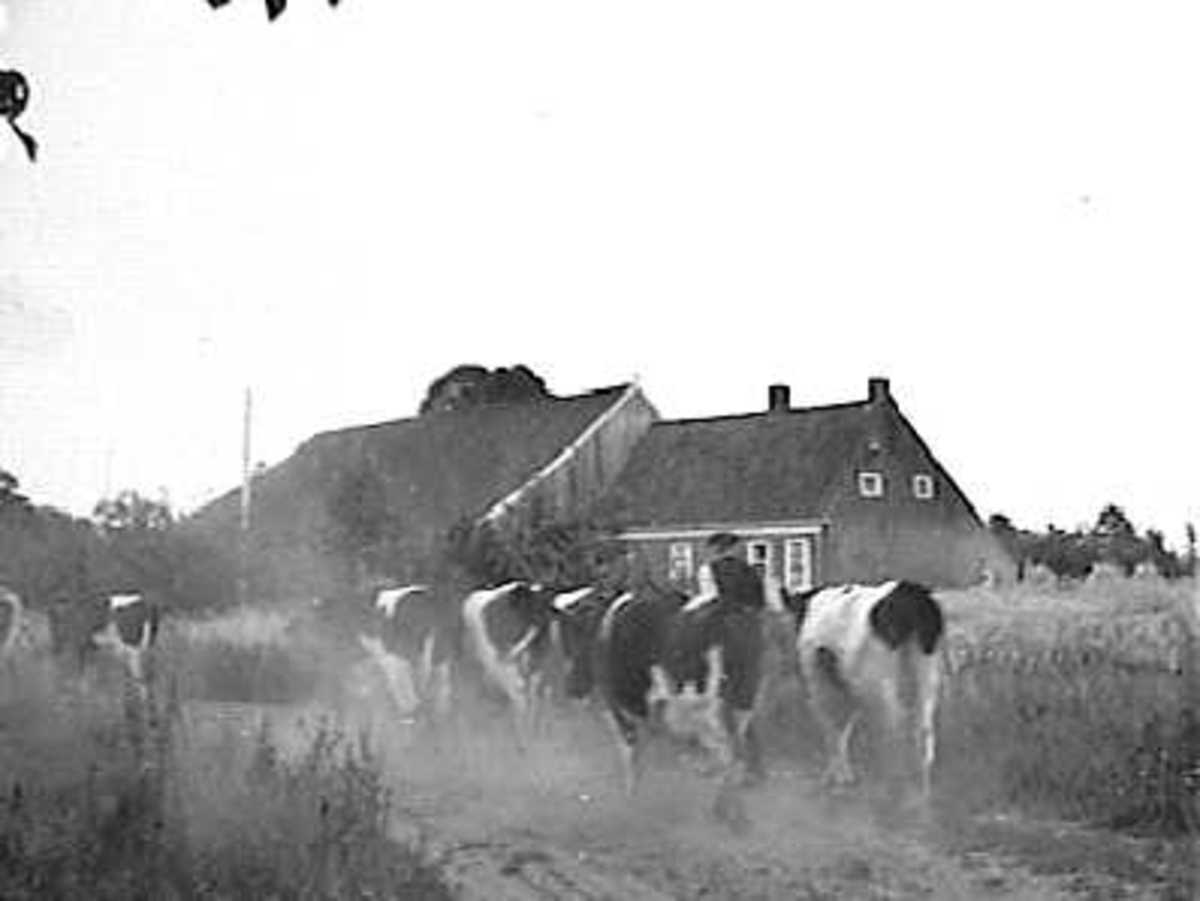
- Cows return to the barn

- Location in the province of Groningen in the Netherlands Ellersinghuizen (Netherlands)
- Coordinates: 53°1′N 7°7′E
- Country: Netherlands
- Province: Groningen
- Municipality: Westerwolde

Area
  - Total: 1.17 km^{2} (0.45 sq mi)
- Elevation: 3.4 m (11 ft)

Population (2021)
  - Total: 80
  - Density: 68/km^{2} (180/sq mi)
- Time zone: UTC+1 (CET)
  - Summer (DST): UTC+2 (CEST)
- Postal code: 9541
- Dialing code: 0597

Ellersinghuizen is a hamlet in the Dutch province of Groningen. It is a part of the municipality of Westerwolde, and lies about 31 km north of Emmen.

The hamlet was first mentioned in 1515 as "tho Ellersynckhuesen", and means "settlement of the Ellersing family". The postal authorities have placed it under Vlagtwedde. Ellersinghuizen has place name signs. It was home to 95 people in 1840.
