= Veele =

- Hamlet
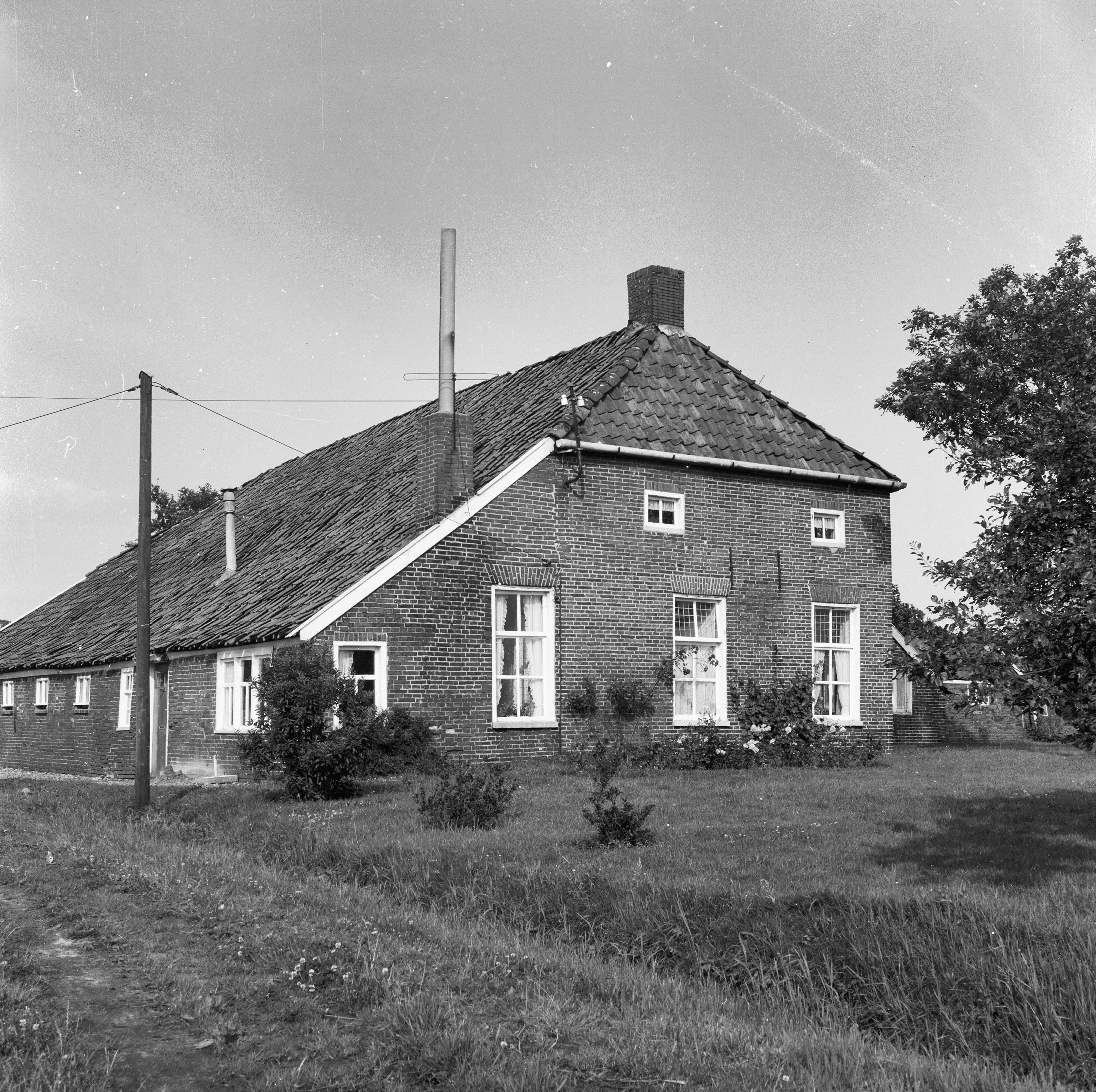
- Farm in Veele

- Location in the province of Groningen in the Netherlands Veele (Netherlands)
- Coordinates: 53°2′N 7°6′E
- Country: Netherlands
- Province: Groningen
- Municipality: Westerwolde

Area
  - Total: 1.64 km^{2} (0.63 sq mi)
- Elevation: 3.4 m (11 ft)

Population (2021)
  - Total: 215
  - Density: 131/km^{2} (340/sq mi)
- Time zone: UTC+1 (CET)
  - Summer (DST): UTC+2 (CEST)
- Postal code: 9541
- Dialing code: 0599

Veele is a hamlet in the Dutch province of Groningen. It is a part of the municipality of Westerwolde, and lies about 32 km north of Emmen.

The hamlet was first mentioned in 1475 as Veille. The etymology is unknown. The postal authorities have placed it under Vlagtwedde. Veele has place name signs. It was home to 224 people in 1840.
