= Laudermarke =

- Hamlet
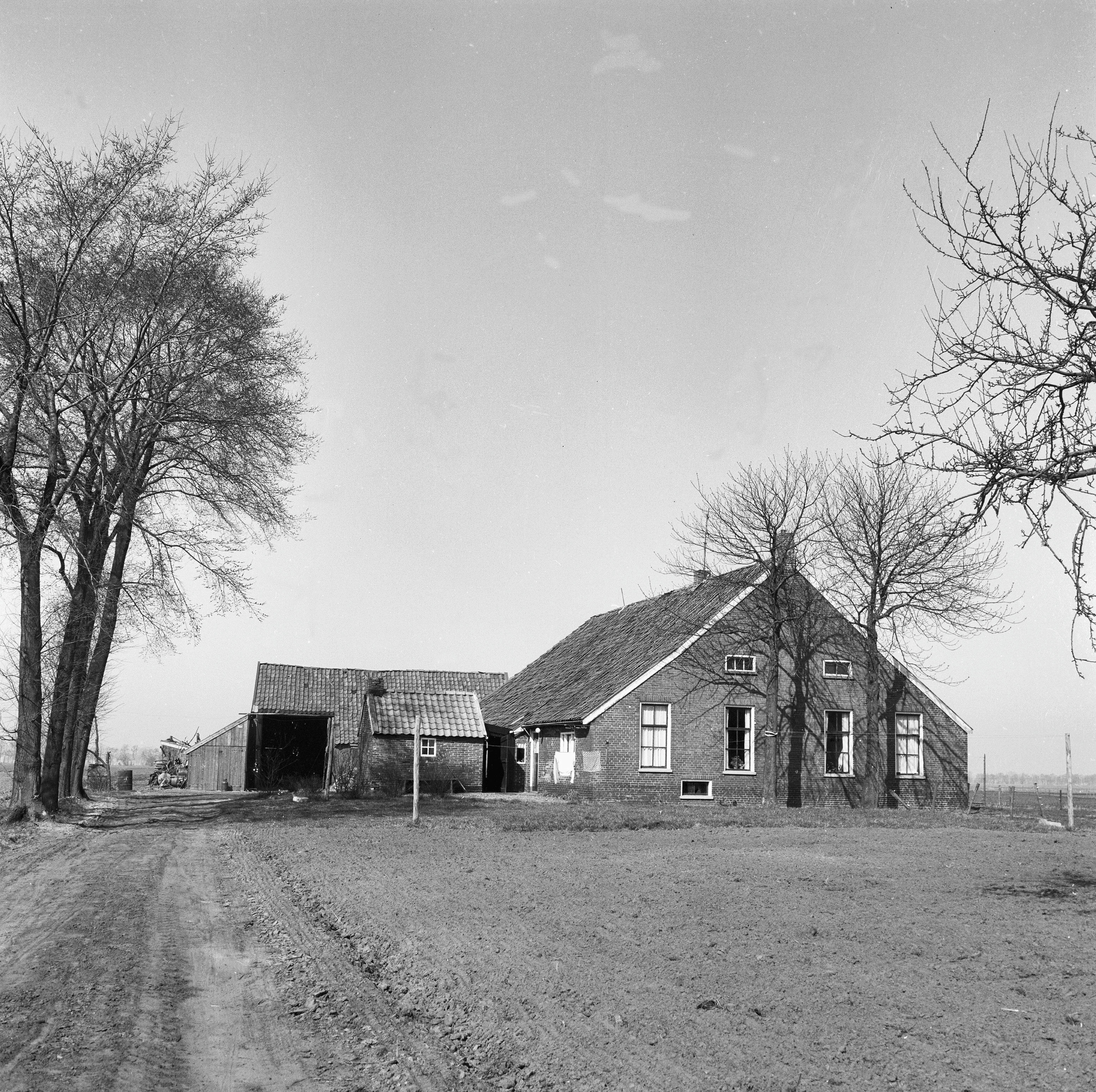
- Farm in Laudermarke

- Location in the province of Groningen in the Netherlands
- Coordinates: 52°53′26″N 7°6′55″E
- Country: Netherlands
- Province: Groningen
- Municipality: Westerwolde

Area
  - Total: 10.28 km^{2} (3.97 sq mi)
- Elevation: 12 m (39 ft)

Population (2021)
  - Total: 115
  - Density: 11.2/km^{2} (29.0/sq mi)
- Time zone: UTC+1 (CET)
  - Summer (DST): UTC+2 (CEST)
- Postal code: 9561
- Dialing code: 0599

Laudermarke is a hamlet in the Dutch province of Groningen. It is a part of the municipality of Westerwolde, and lies about 19 km northeast of Emmen.

Laudermarke has about 30 houses.

The hamlet was first mentioned in as 1466 Lauder marke, and means "fenced off terrain belonging to Laude. The postal authorities have placed it under Ter Apel.
