= Sellingerbeetse =

- Hamlet
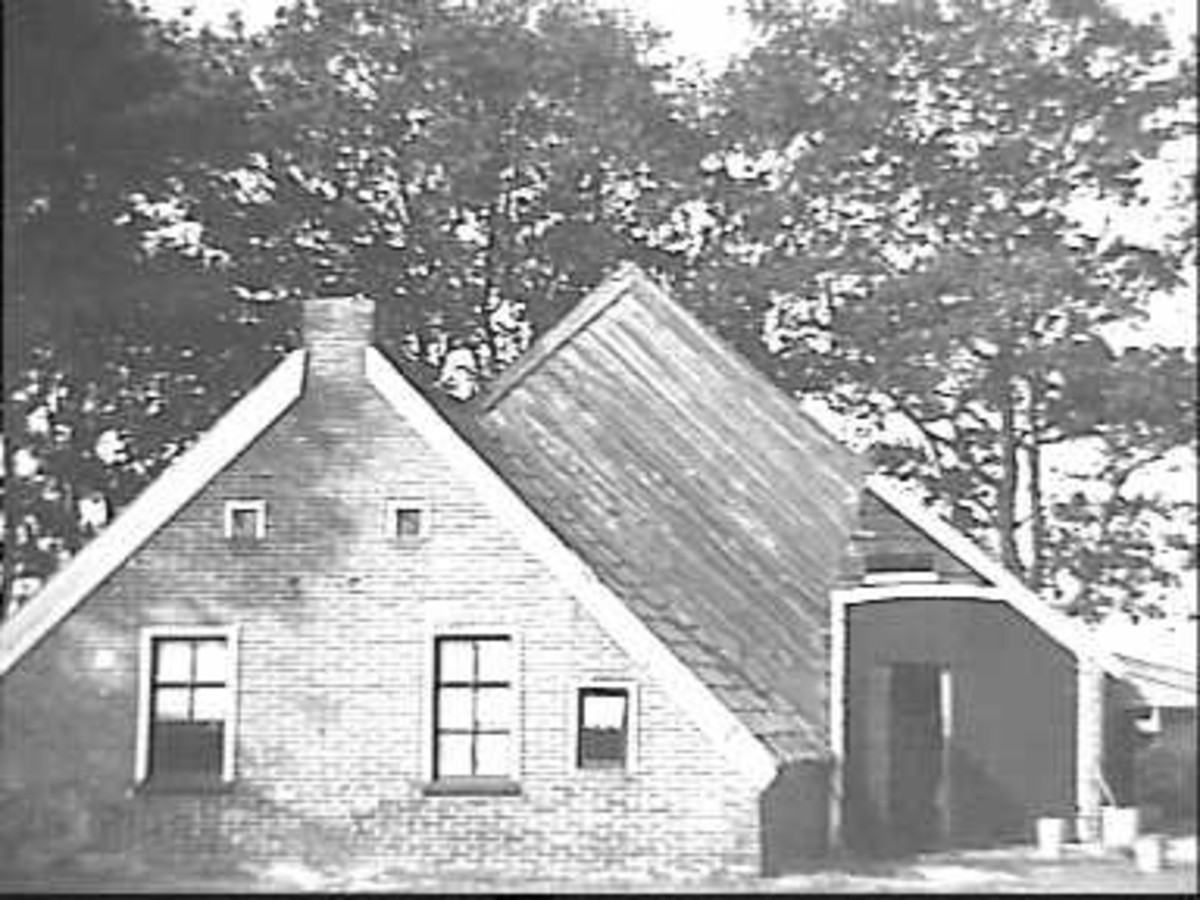
- Farm in Sellingerbeetse

- Location in the province of Groningen in the Netherlands Sellingerbeetse (Netherlands)
- Coordinates: 52°56′N 7°5′E
- Country: Netherlands
- Province: Groningen
- Municipality: Westerwolde

Sellingerbeetse (Gronings: Beetse) is a village in the Dutch province of Groningen. It is a part of the municipality of Westerwolde, and lies about 5 km southwest of Sellingen and 8 km north of Ter Apel. The core village has a population of about 210, while the Sellingerbeetse including the surrounding countryside has a population of around 760.

The village has a church, Opwaarts! (Upwards!), built in Amsterdam School style in 1925 by the Dutch Reformed Church. Nowadays it serves as a cultural stage and is used for, amongst other things, expositions.

Near the village are the remains of internment camp Kamp de Beetse, in use between 1935 and 1948, where it served several housing purposes. Initially, from 1935, it was as a working camp for jobless Dutchmen. From January 1942, during the Second World War, the German military housed several hundreds Jews from Amsterdam, who were transported to the Auschwitz concentration camp in October 1942 where many died. In 1944 it housed several hundreds Dutchmen for Unfree labour on the local farms. Later in 1944, when the southern part of the Netherlands were liberated, it temporally housed members from the NSB, who as collaborators with the Germans had fled to the north. After the liberation in 1945, hundreds of former NSB and SS members were imprisoned. The camp was closed in 1948, and currently only one single barrack remains.

The Sellingerveld (field of Sellingen) is an area located near the town. It contains a lake, the Beetserplas (Gronings: Beetser koeln), formed as the result of intensive excavations and popular for recreation. A camping site is located near the lake.
