= Vlagtwedder-Veldhuis =

- Hamlet
- Location in the province of Groningen in the Netherlands Vlagtwedder-Veldhuis (Netherlands)
- Coordinates: 53°0′45″N 7°7′54″E
- Country: Netherlands
- Province: Groningen
- Municipality: Westerwolde

Area
  - Total: 0.81 km^{2} (0.31 sq mi)
- Elevation: 3.4 m (11 ft)

Population (2021)
  - Total: 100
  - Density: 120/km^{2} (320/sq mi)
- Time zone: UTC+1 (CET)
  - Summer (DST): UTC+2 (CEST)
- Postal code: 9541
- Dialing code: 0599

Vlagtwedder-Veldhuis is a hamlet in the Dutch province of Groningen. It is a part of the municipality of Westerwolde, and lies about 30 km north of Emmen.

The hamlet was first mentioned in 1634 as Veldhuys, and means "(temporary) settlement in the fields near Vlagtwedde. The postal authorities have placed it under Vlagtwedde. Vlagtwedder-Veldhuis has place name signs, and had a tram stop between 1915 and 1948.
