= Hebrecht =

- Hamlet
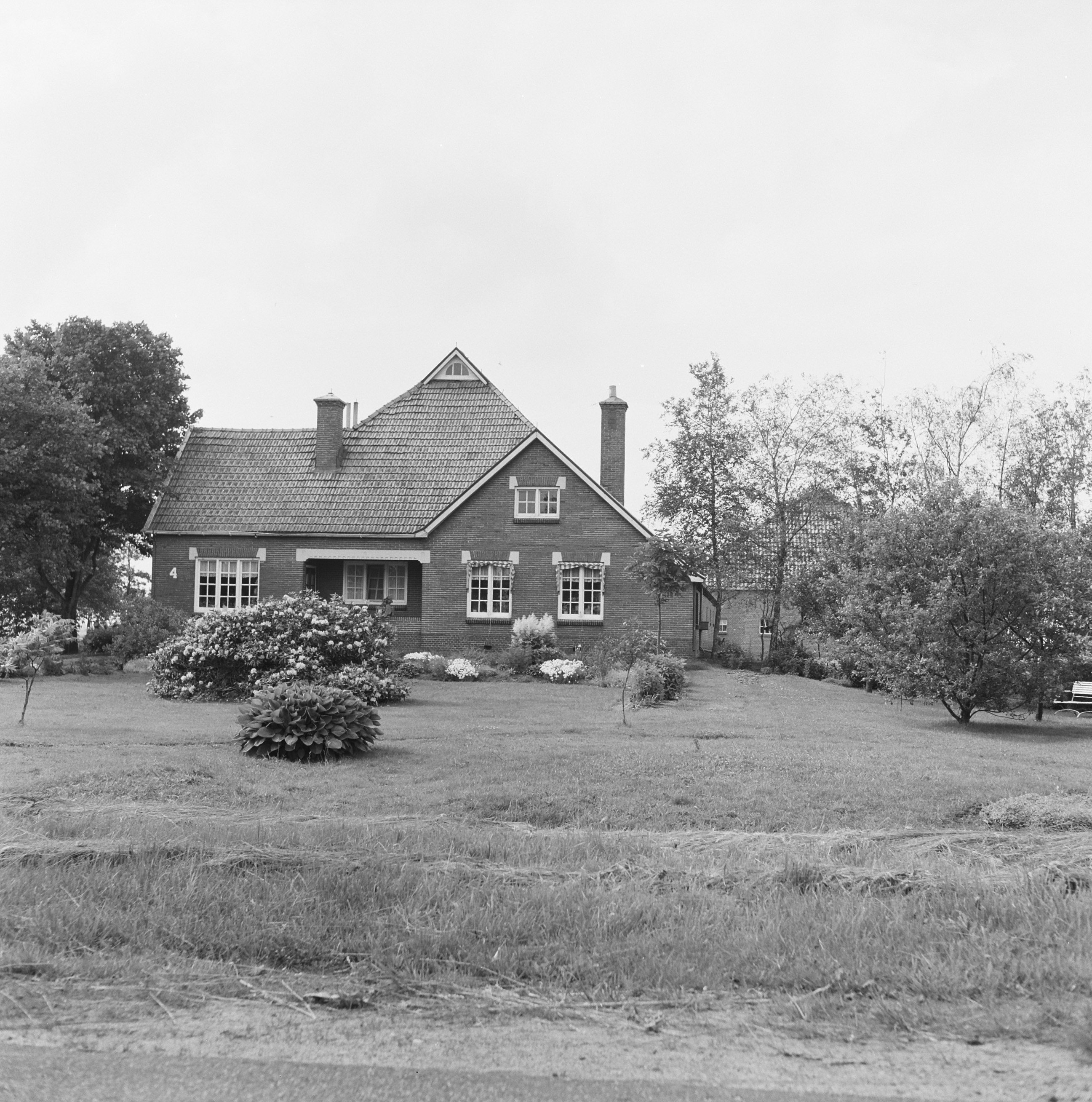
- Farm in Hebrecht

- Location in the province of Groningen in the Netherlands Hebrecht (Netherlands)
- Coordinates: 53.0408°N 7.1764°E
- Country: Netherlands
- Province: Groningen
- Municipality: Westerwolde

Area
  - Total: 14.18 km^{2} (5.47 sq mi)
- Elevation: 3.4 m (11 ft)

Population (2021)
  - Total: 80
  - Density: 5.6/km^{2} (15/sq mi)
- Time zone: UTC+1 (CET)
  - Summer (DST): UTC+2 (CEST)
- Postal code: 9541
- Dialing code: 0599

Hebrecht is a hamlet in the Dutch province of Groningen. It is a part of the municipality of Westerwolde, and lies about 34 km north of Emmen.

The village was first mentioned in 1867 as Het Hebrecht, and means "selfish person" which relates to the long lasting feud between Groningen and Münster about the ownership of the border area. Hebrecht became a colloquial name for the region. The postal authorities have placed the hamlet under Vlagtwedde. Hebrecht has place name signs. It was the peat colony in Groningen.
