= Stakenborg =

- Hamlet
- Location in the province of Groningen in the Netherlands
- Coordinates: 53°1′N 7°11′E
- Country: Netherlands
- Province: Groningen
- Municipality: Westerwolde

Area
  - Total: 5.58 km^{2} (2.15 sq mi)
- Elevation: 6 m (20 ft)

Population (2021)
  - Total: 185
  - Density: 33.2/km^{2} (85.9/sq mi)
- Time zone: UTC+1 (CET)
  - Summer (DST): UTC+2 (CEST)
- Postal code: 9545
- Dialing code: 0599

Stakenborg (Dutch pronunciation: [ˈstaːkə(m)bɔr(ə)x]) is a hamlet in the Dutch province of Groningen. It is a part of the municipality of Westerwolde, and lies about 33 km northeast of Emmen.

The hamlet was first mentioned between 1851 and 1855 as Stakenburg, and is a combination of a thin pole and borg (castle). The postal authorities have placed it under Bourtange. Stakenborg has place name signs.
