= Pallert =

- Hamlet
- Location in the province of Groningen in the Netherlands Pallert (Netherlands)
- Coordinates: 52°59′54″N 7°12′7″E
- Country: Netherlands
- Province: Groningen
- Municipality: Westerwolde

Area
  - Total: 0.85 km^{2} (0.33 sq mi)
- Elevation: 6.2 m (20 ft)

Population (2021)
  - Total: 60
  - Density: 71/km^{2} (180/sq mi)
- Time zone: UTC+1 (CET)
  - Summer (DST): UTC+2 (CEST)
- Postal code: 9545
- Dialing code: 0599

Pallert is a hamlet in the Dutch province of Groningen. It is a part of the municipality of Westerwolde.

The hamlet was first mentioned in 1899 as Pallert, and means "swampy pool". The postal authorities have placed it under Bourtange. Pallert has place signs.
