= Jipsingboertange =

- Hamlet
- Location in the province of Groningen in the Netherlands Jipsingboertange (Netherlands)
- Coordinates: 52°58′N 7°6′E
- Country: Netherlands
- Province: Groningen
- Municipality: Westerwolde

Area
  - Total: 0.47 km^{2} (0.18 sq mi)

Population (2021)
  - Total: 175
  - Density: 370/km^{2} (960/sq mi)
- Time zone: UTC+1 (CET)
  - Summer (DST): UTC+2 (CEST)
- Postal code: 9551
- Dialing code: 0599

Jipsingboertange is a hamlet in the Dutch province of Groningen. It is a part of the municipality of Westerwolde, and lies about 25 km northeast of Emmen. In 2021, the village of Jipsingboertange had 175 inhabitants. The postal authority does not consider the village a separate entity and has placed it under Sellingen.

Jipsingboertange used to be characterised by heath and raised bogs. Prior to 1898, the hamlet contained two farms. In 1898, the area was cultivated and a hamlet appeared. Part of the cultivation was performed by the unemployment during the 1930s. The road through the village is characterised by large farms. By 1909, the population had increased to 59 people. During the cultivation, a little lake was created which is used for ice skating contests.
