= Wollinghuizen =

- Hamlet
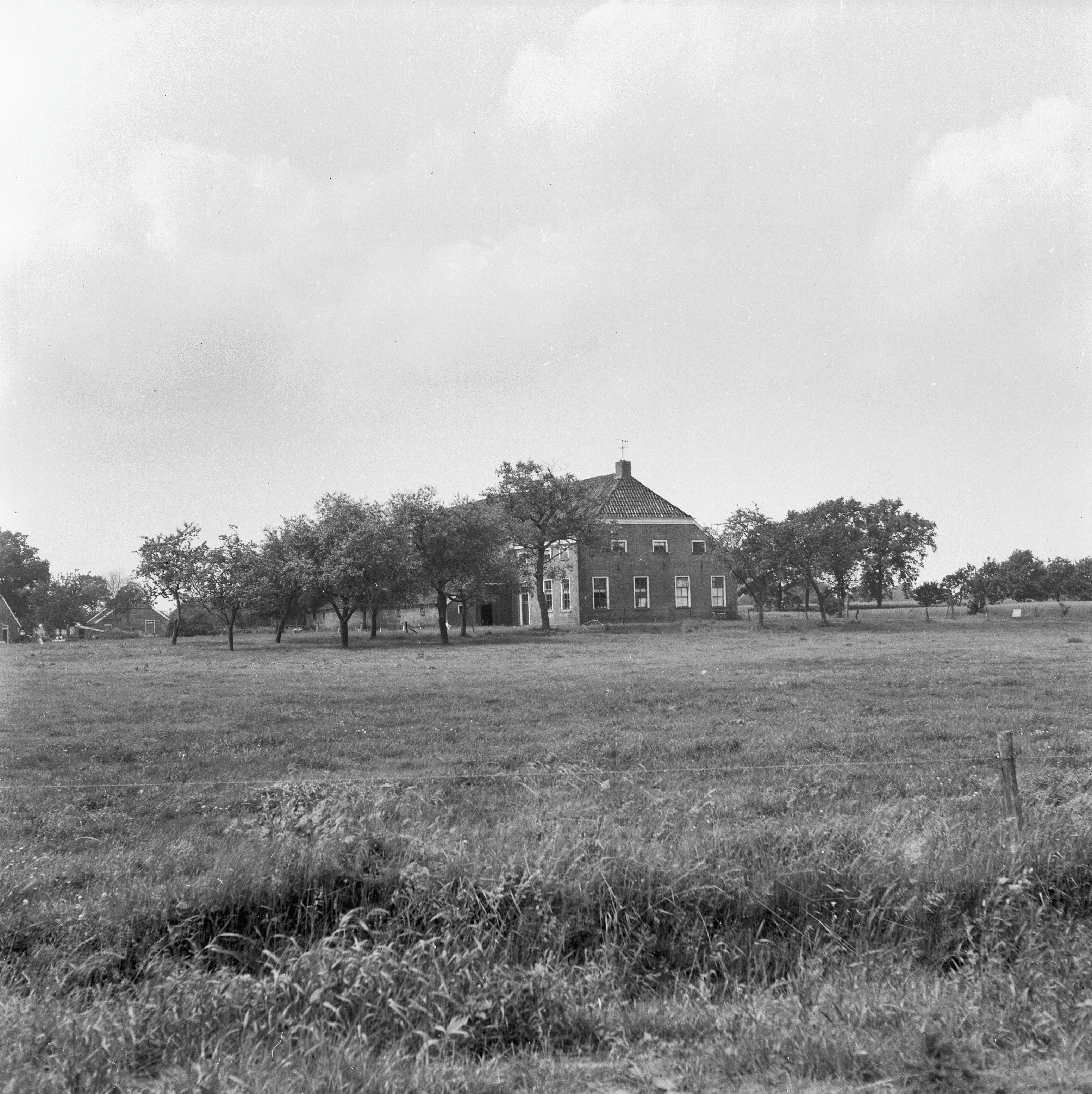
- Farm in Wollinghuizen

- Location in the province of Groningen in the Netherlands Wollinghuizen (Netherlands)
- Coordinates: 52°59′38″N 7°8′57″E
- Country: Netherlands
- Province: Groningen
- Municipality: Westerwolde

Area
  - Total: 0.45 km^{2} (0.17 sq mi)
- Elevation: 3.4 m (11 ft)

Population (2021)
  - Total: 50
  - Density: 110/km^{2} (290/sq mi)
- Time zone: UTC+1 (CET)
  - Summer (DST): UTC+2 (CEST)
- Postal code: 9541
- Dialing code: 0599

Wollinghuizen is a hamlet in the Dutch province of Groningen. It is a part of the municipality of Westerwolde, and lies about 29 km northeast of Emmen.

The hamlet was first mentioned in 1482 "myt dem gantzen dorpe Waldingehusen", and means "settlement of the family Waldinga". The postal authorities have placed it under Vlagtwedde. Wollinghuizen was home to 81 people in 1840.
