= Harpel =

- Hamlet
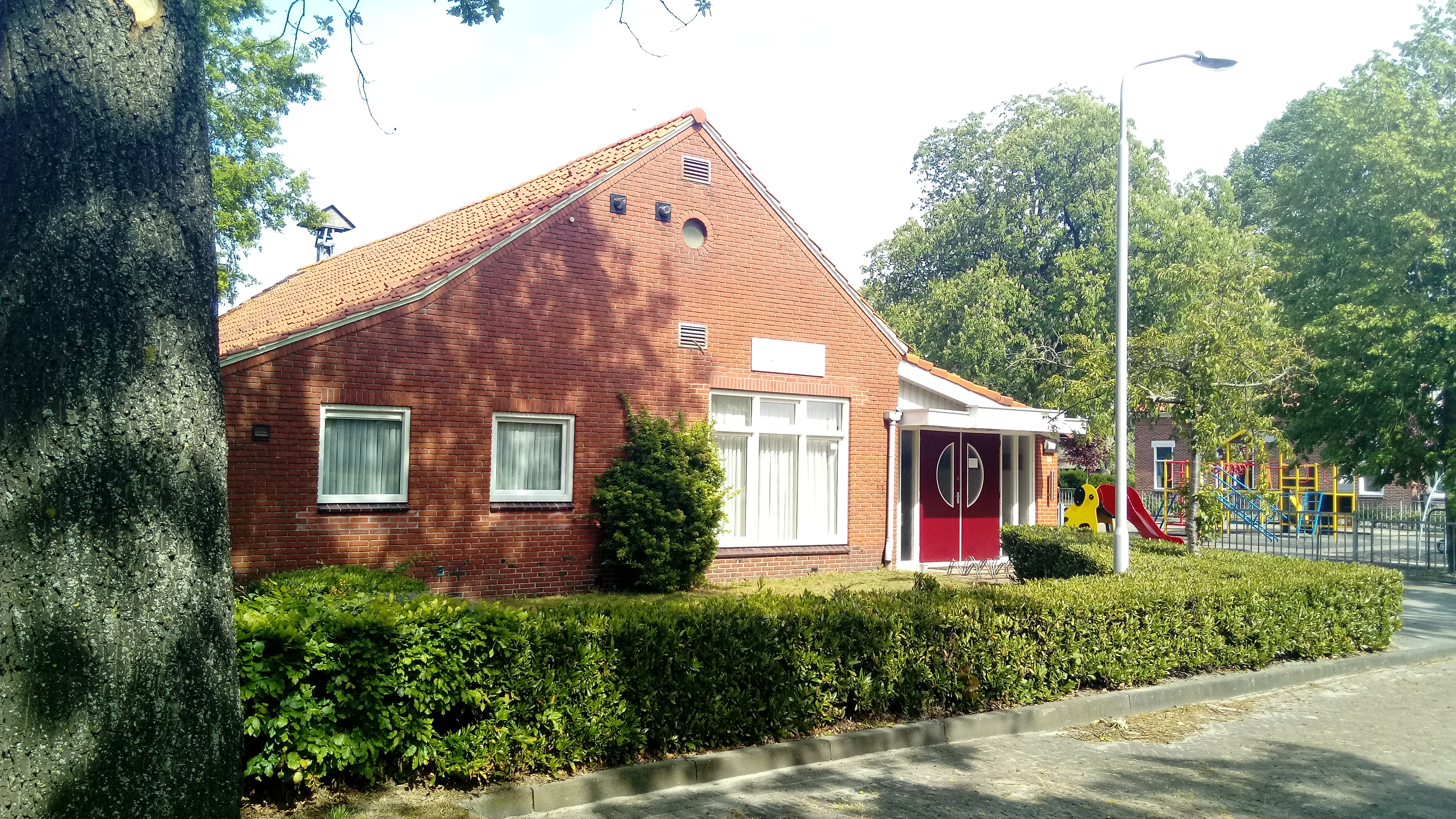
- Community house

- Location in the province of Groningen in the Netherlands Harpel (Netherlands)
- Coordinates: 52°59′59″N 7°5′18″E
- Country: Netherlands
- Province: Groningen
- Municipality: Westerwolde

Area
  - Total: 1.91 km^{2} (0.74 sq mi)
- Elevation: 3.4 m (11 ft)

Population (2021)
  - Total: 155
  - Density: 81.2/km^{2} (210/sq mi)
- Time zone: UTC+1 (CET)
  - Summer (DST): UTC+2 (CEST)
- Postal code: 9541
- Dialing code: 0599

Harpel is a hamlet in the Dutch province of Groningen. It is a part of the municipality of Westerwolde, and lies about 28 km north of Emmen.

The hamlet was first mentioned in 1867 as Harpel. The etymology in unclear. The postal authorities have placed it under Vlagtwedde. Harpel has place name signs.
