= Weite =

- Hamlet
- Location in the province of Groningen in the Netherlands Weite (Netherlands)
- Coordinates: 53°1′27″N 7°8′22″E
- Country: Netherlands
- Province: Groningen
- Municipality: Westerwolde

Area
  - Total: 0.32 km^{2} (0.12 sq mi)
- Elevation: 3.4 m (11 ft)

Population (2021)
  - Total: 55
  - Density: 170/km^{2} (450/sq mi)
- Time zone: UTC+1 (CET)
  - Summer (DST): UTC+2 (CEST)
- Postal code: 9541
- Dialing code: 0599

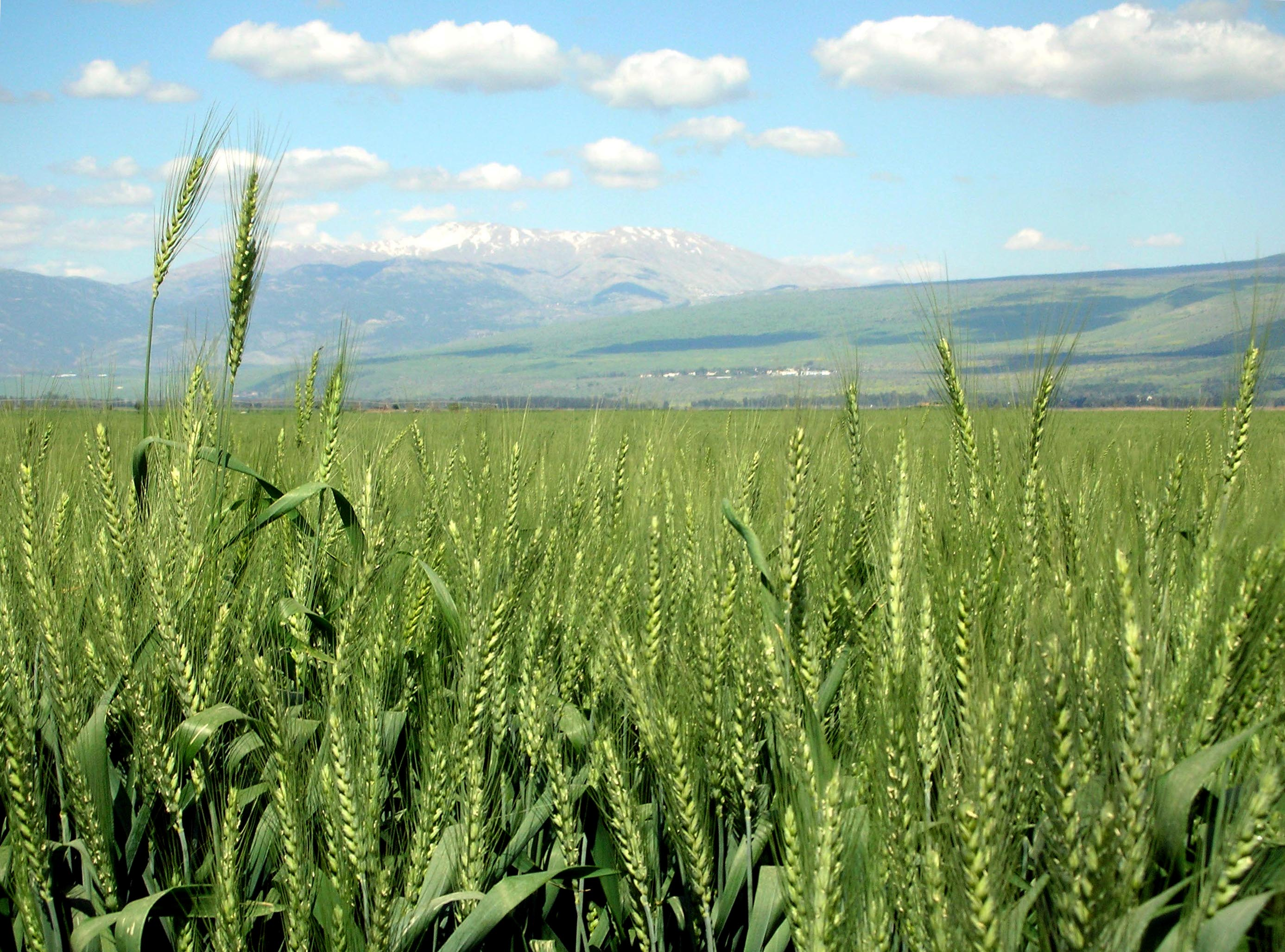

Weite is a hamlet in the Dutch province of Groningen. It is a part of the municipality of Westerwolde, and lies about 32 km north of Emmen.

The hamlet was first mentioned in 1913 as Weite. The etymology is unknown. The postal authorities have placed it under Vlagtwedde. Weite has place name signs and a church.
