= Laude, Netherlands =

Laude
- Hamlet
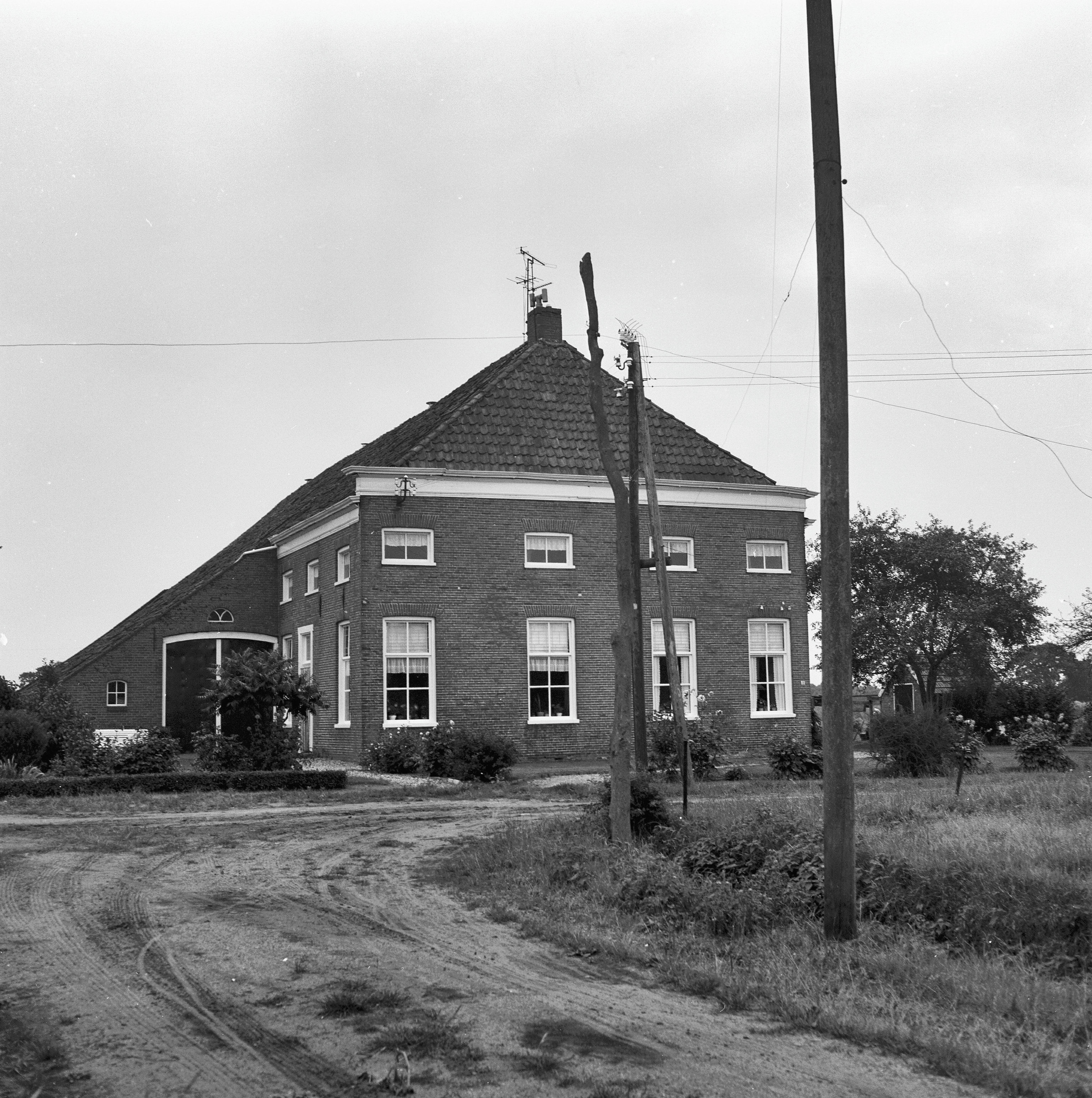
- Farm in Laude

- Location in the province of Groningen in the Netherlands
- Coordinates: 52°55′40″N 7°7′42″E
- Country: Netherlands
- Province: Groningen
- Municipality: Westerwolde

Area
  - Total: 0.56 km^{2} (0.22 sq mi)
- Elevation: 9 m (30 ft)

Population (2021)
  - Total: 40
  - Density: 71/km^{2} (180/sq mi)
- Time zone: UTC+1 (CET)
  - Summer (DST): UTC+2 (CEST)
- Postal code: 9551
- Dialing code: 0599

Laude is a hamlet in the Dutch province of Groningen. It is a part of the municipality of Westerwolde, and lies about 23 km northeast of Emmen.

The hamlet was first mentioned in 1466 as Lauder marke. The etymology is unclear. The postal authorities have placed it under Sellingen. Laude has place name signs. It was home to 80 people in 1840.
