= Ter Wisch =

- Hamlet
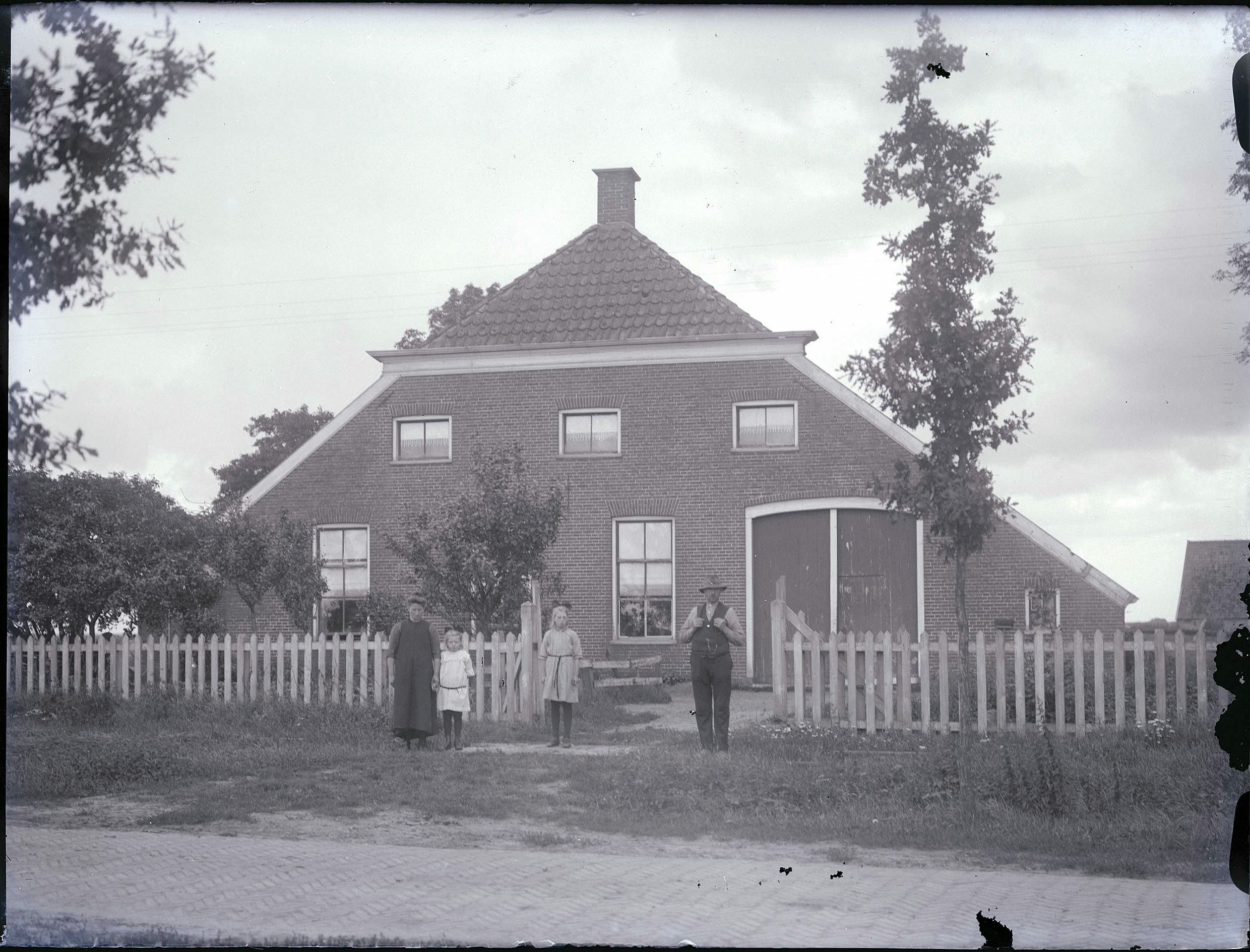
- Farm in Ter Wisch

- Location in the province of Groningen in the Netherlands
- Coordinates: 52°54′50″N 7°5′55″E
- Country: Netherlands
- Province: Groningen
- Municipality: Westerwolde

Area
  - Total: 22.83 km^{2} (8.81 sq mi)
- Elevation: 12 m (39 ft)

Population (2021)
  - Total: 310
  - Density: 14/km^{2} (35/sq mi)
- Time zone: UTC+1 (CET)
  - Summer (DST): UTC+2 (CEST)
- Postal code: 9561
- Dialing code: 0599

Ter Wisch is a hamlet in the Dutch province of Groningen. It is a part of the municipality of Westerwolde, and lies about 20 km northeast of Emmen.

The hamlet was first mentioned in 1474 as de wisck, and means "wet pasture which often gets flooded in winter". The postal authorities have placed it under Ter Apel. Ter Wisch has place name signs. It was home to 29 people in 1840.
