= Munnekemoer =

- Hamlet
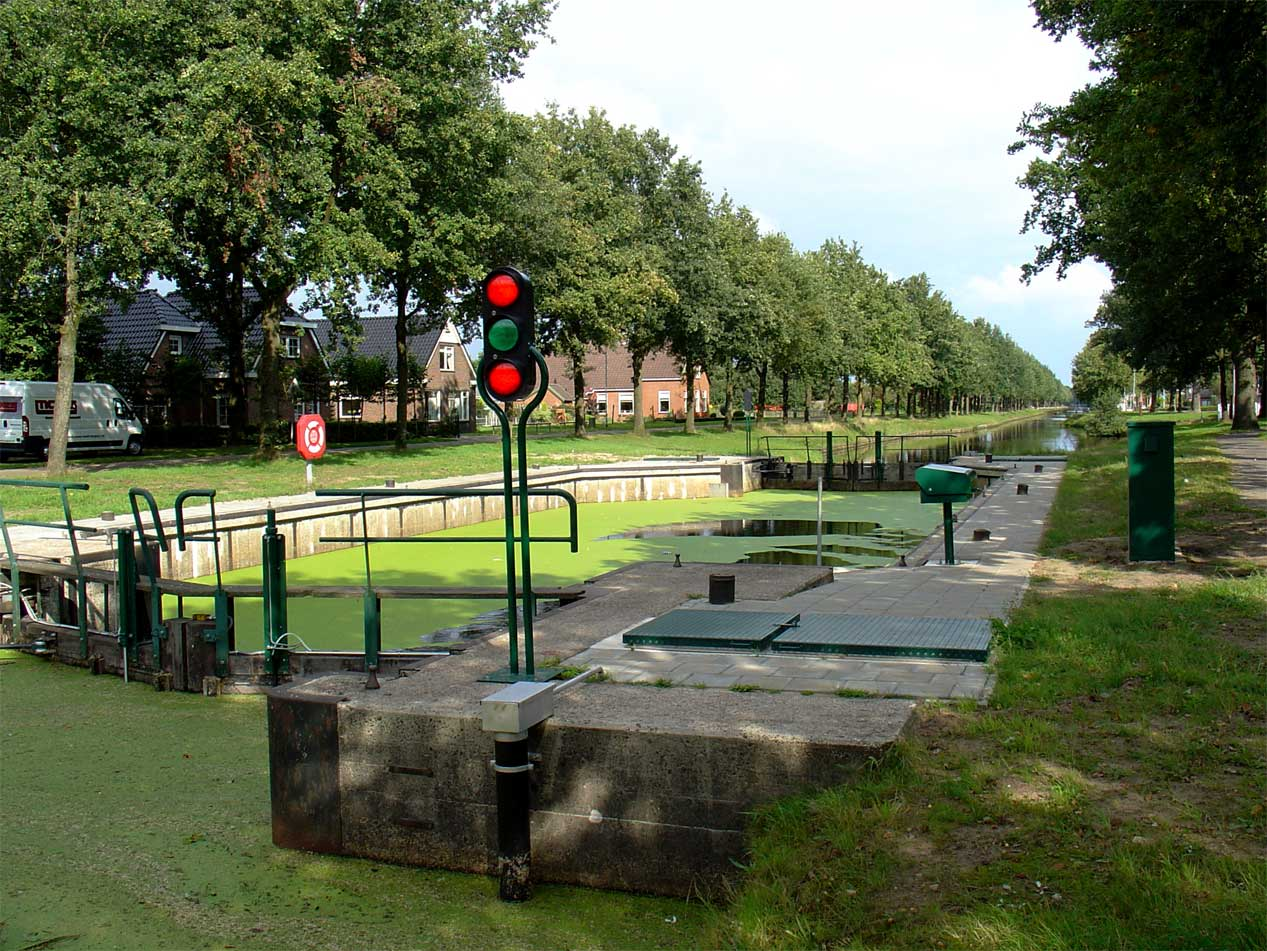
- Munnekemoer bij de 8e verlaat

- Location in the province of Groningen in the Netherlands
- Coordinates: 52°50′38″N 7°4′57″E
- Country: Netherlands
- Province: Groningen
- Municipality: Westerwolde

Area
  - Total: 1.49 km^{2} (0.58 sq mi)
- Elevation: 0.4 m (1.3 ft)

Population (2021)
  - Total: 180
  - Density: 120/km^{2} (310/sq mi)
- Time zone: UTC+1 (CET)
  - Summer (DST): UTC+2 (CEST)
- Postal code: 9561
- Dialing code: 0599

Munnekemoer is a hamlet in the Dutch province of Groningen. It is a part of the municipality of Westerwolde, and lies about 14 km northeast of Emmen.

The hamlet was first mentioned in 1781 as 't Munneke Moer, and means "moorland of the monks" which is a reference to the nearby Ter Apel Monastery. The postal authorities have placed it under Ter Apel. Munnekemoer has place name signs.
