= Siert Bruins =

Dutch criminal (1921–2015)

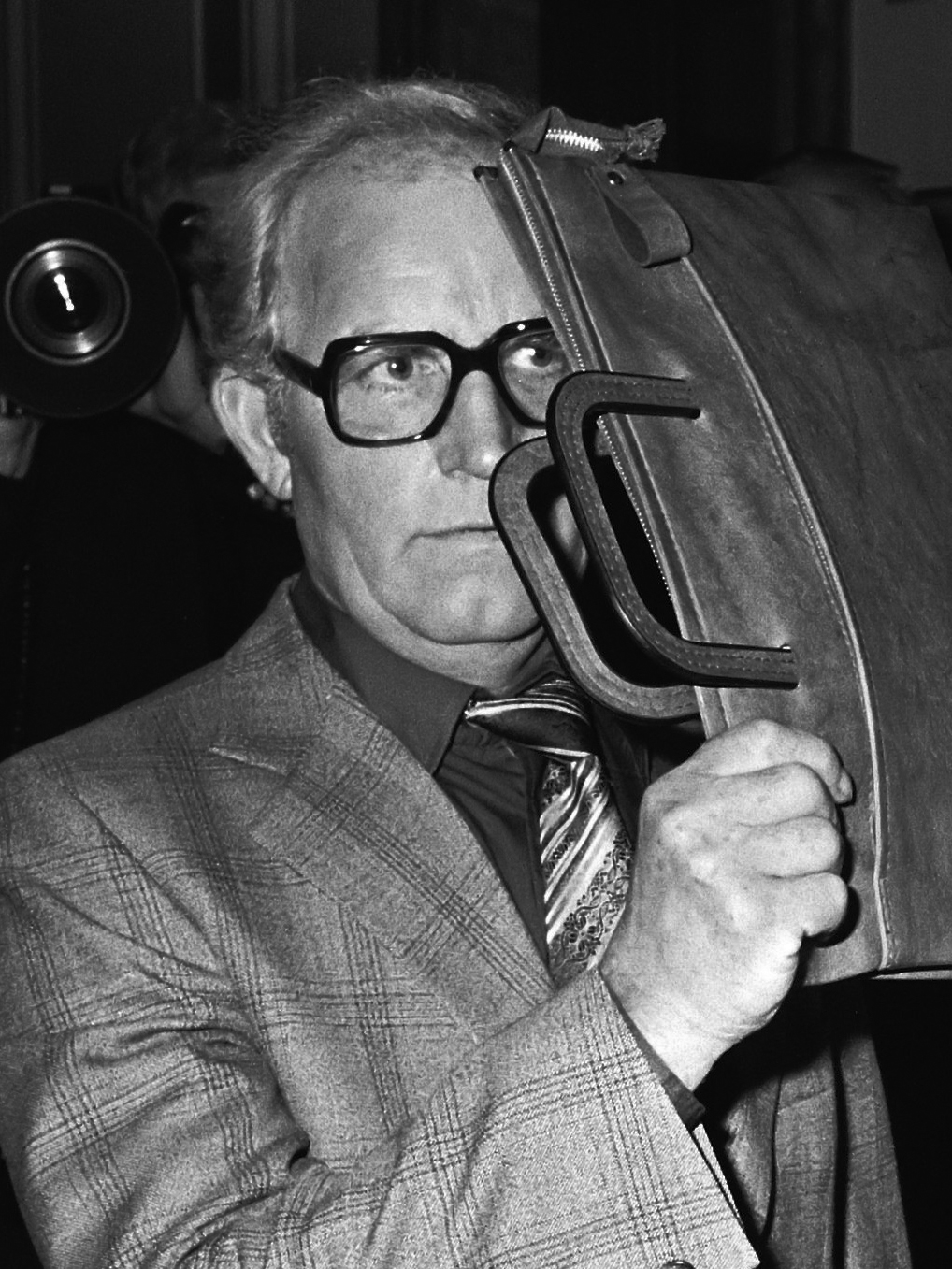
Bruins in 1979

Siert Bruins (2 March 1921 – 28 September 2015), also known as Siegfried Bruns and nicknamed the Beast of Appingedam, was a Dutch member of the SS and SD during World War II.

== Biography ==
Bruins was born in March 1921 in Weite, Netherlands. He had 3 brothers. Together with his father Harm and his brother Derk-Elsko he became a member of the Dutch political party NSB.

During the war both Bruins brothers joined the Waffen SS and fought at the Eastern Front, where Derk-Elsko received the Knights' Cross. When Siert became wounded he returned to the Netherlands and became member of the German Sicherheitsdienst (SD). He was active around Delfzijl hunting members of the Resistance. During the last days of WW II Bruins fled to Germany, where he could escape from the Dutch jurisdiction because he was granted the German nationality as a former Nazi-soldier on basis of a 1943 law.

In Germany he lived in the village of Breckerfeld, where he was discovered by Simon Wiesenthal. He changed his name to Bruns and operated a farm in horticulture. It appears he has visited his mother in Assen in the trunk of a car several times. The wife and two sons of Bruins were during the trial in 1978 not aware of his crimes.

Derk-Elsko Bruins also lived in Germany after the war, where he died on 5 February 1986 in Gerolstein. Siert Bruins died in September 2015 at the age of 94.

== Prosecutions and convictions ==
He was sentenced to death in absentia by a Dutch court in 1949 for his murder of Dutch farmer and Resistance member Aldert Klaas Dijkema. Germany refused to render him to the Netherlands. The death sentence was later revised into a lifelong sentence.

In 1978, Bruins was tracked to the German town of Altenbreckerfeld by Simon Wiesenthal. He was arrested and placed on trial in Germany, where he was found guilty of being an accessory to the murder of two Jewish brothers, Meijer en Lazarus (Laas) Sleutelberg, in Farmsum, in the north of the Netherlands. Bruins was sentenced to 7 years in prison, of which he served five. The bodies of the brothers have never been found, because Bruins refused to talk.

In 2003, the Dutch minister Donner tried to convince the German authorities to send Bruins to the Netherlands, but without success.

Dutch journalist Gideon Levy told the German authorities about other crimes of Bruins. In October 2013 he was placed on trial in Hagen, Germany. Though Bruins admitted to being present when Dijkema was executed in the night of 21 September 1944 in Appingedam, near the Brons factory, he claimed the shot was fired by his SS superior, Oberscharführer August Neuhäuser. Neuhäuser was convicted of the murder in the Netherlands. He died in 1985.

In January 2014, presiding judge Heike Hartmann-Garschagen ruled that there were too many gaps in the evidence and dropped the case against Bruins. Bruins could not be convicted of murder, because no witnesses could be called, "the exact circumstances of the crime can no longer be established," she said. An alternative conviction, for manslaughter, was not possible due to statute of limitations. In the Dutch conviction from 1949 it is stated that according to a confession of Neuhäuser, both men, Bruins and Neuhäuser have shot Dijkema in the back, each with 4 bullets.
