= Ter Apelkanaal =

- Village
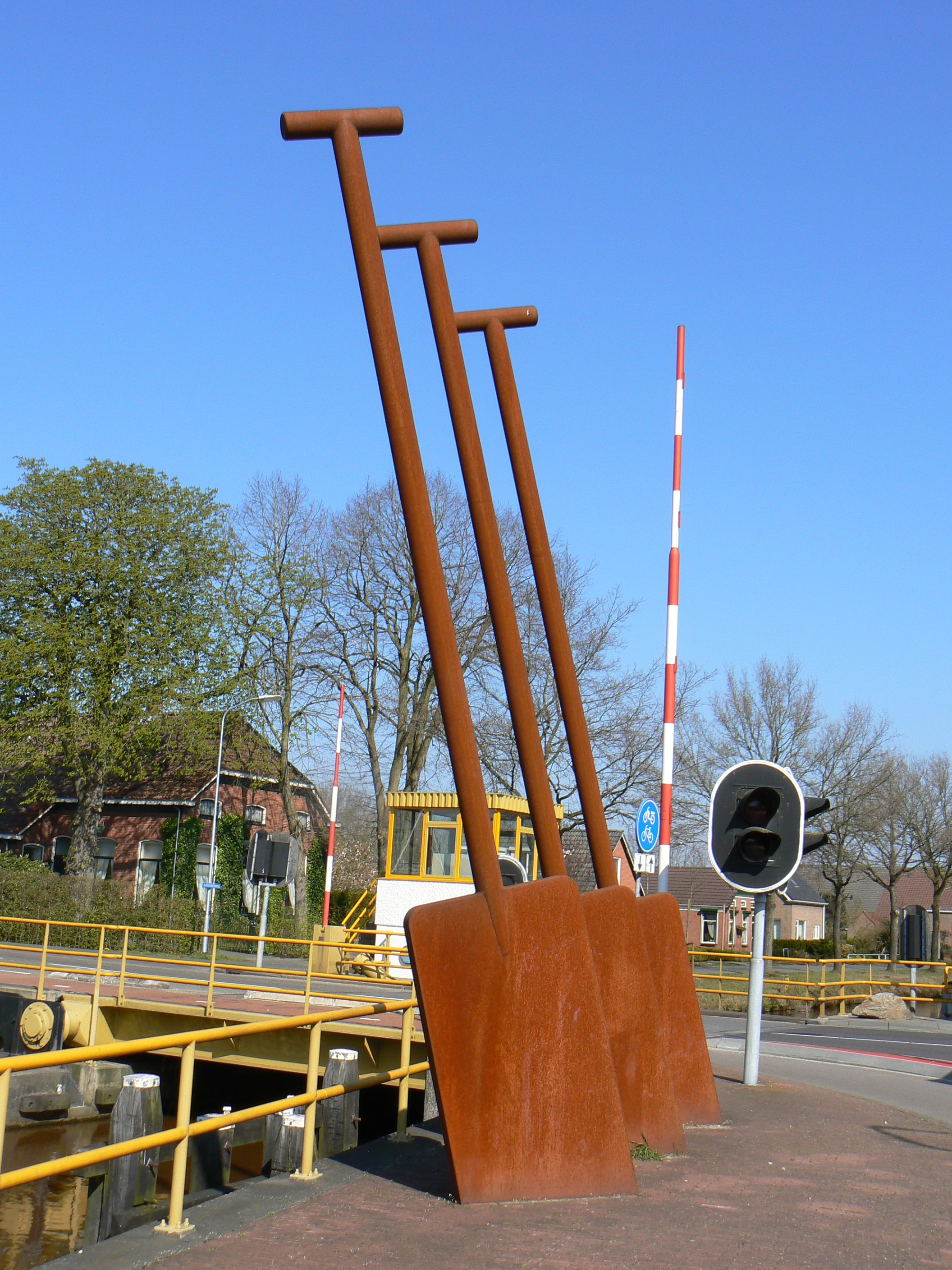
- Sculpture in Ter Apelkanaal

- Location in the province of Groningen in the Netherlands Ter Apelkanaal (Netherlands)
- Coordinates: 52°55′4″N 7°2′27″E
- Country: Netherlands
- Province: Groningen
- Municipality: Westerwolde

Area
  - Total: 2.06 km^{2} (0.80 sq mi)
- Elevation: 11 m (36 ft)

Population (2021)
  - Total: 660
  - Density: 320/km^{2} (830/sq mi)
- Time zone: UTC+1 (CET)
  - Summer (DST): UTC+2 (CEST)
- Postal code: 9563
- Dialing code: 0599

Ter Apelkanaal (Gronings: Troapelknoal [ˌtrʊːpl̩ˈknʊːl]) is a town in the Dutch province of Groningen. It is a part of the municipality of Westerwolde, and lies about 17 km (11 mi) northeast of Emmen.

The city of Groningen decided to dig a canal along the border with Drenthe to exploit the peat. The canal was finished in 1856 and named Ter Apelkanaal and the settlement was named after the canal.

On 1902, construction started of a potato starch factory "Musselkanaal en Omstreken" in Ter Apelkanaal. The factory is nowadays owned by Royal Avebe.

Ter Apelkanaal used to be part of Vlagtwedde. In 2017, it was merged into Westerwolde.
