= Anke de Vries =

Dutch writer

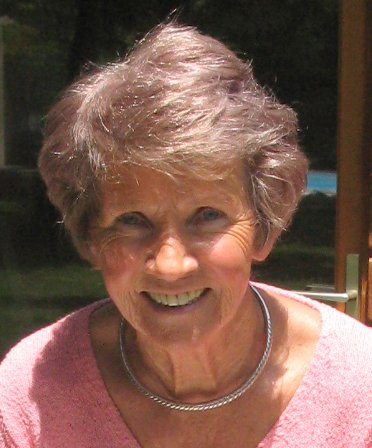
- Anke de Vries (2012)
- Born: 5 December 1936 (age 89); Sellingen
- Writing career
- Genre: Children's literature
- Notable awards: Prijs van de Nederlandse Kinderjury

Anke de Vries (born Sellingen, 5 December 1936) is a prolific Dutch writer of books for children and young adults. She has written nearly 80 and has won several awards. Her novel Blauwe plekken won the Prijs van de Nederlandse Kinderjury and was translated into English by Stacey Knecht.
