= Sellingen =

- Village
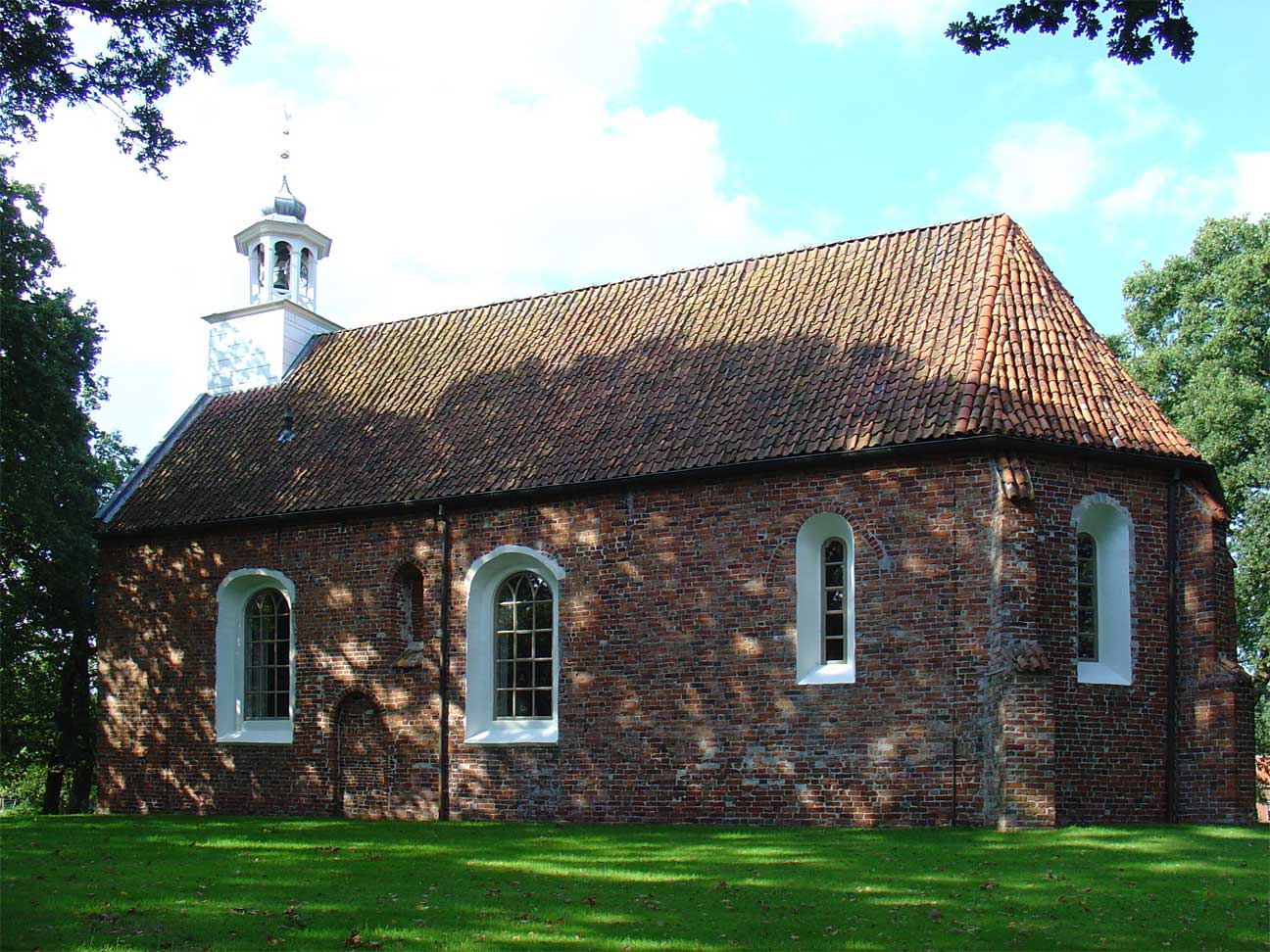
- Late roman church in Sellingen

- Location in province of Groningen in the Netherlands Sellingen (Netherlands)
- Coordinates: 52°56′47″N 07°09′05″E
- Country: Netherlands
- Province: Groningen
- Municipality: Westerwolde

Area
  - Village: 29.75 km^{2} (11.49 sq mi)
  - Land: 29.28 km^{2} (11.31 sq mi)
  - Water: 0.48 km^{2} (0.19 sq mi)
  - Urban: 0.79 km^{2} (0.31 sq mi)
- Elevation: 9 m (30 ft)

Population (2021)
  - Village: 1,880
  - Density: 64.2/km^{2} (166/sq mi)
  - Urban: 1,045
  - Urban density: 1,300/km^{2} (3,400/sq mi)
- Time zone: UTC+1 (CET)
  - Summer (DST): UTC+2 (CEST)
- Postal code: 9551
- Dialing code: 0599

Sellingen (Dutch pronunciation: [ˈsɛlɪŋən]; Gronings: Zèlng [ˈzɛːɫŋ̍]) is a village in the Dutch province of Groningen. It is a part of the municipality of Westerwolde, and lies about 25 kilometres (16 mi) northeast of Emmen. In 2021, statistical area "Sellingen", which also includes the surrounding countryside, had a population of 1,880, and the village of Sellingen had 1,045.

== Overview ==
Sellingen was founded in the 12th century on a sandy ridge along the River Ruiten Aa. The church dates from the 1300s, however a church in Sellingen was already mentioned around 1150 on a list of possession of the Diocese of Osnabrück. In the 15th century, the Ter Apel Monastery was part of the parish of Sellingen.

In 1665, the bishop of Münster secretly constructed a road through the moor from Walchum in Lower Saxony to Sellingen as part of a planned invasion of Groningen. At neighbouring Jipsinghuizen, the Münster Army was attacked by the Dutch Republic, and had to retreat after the Battle of Jipsinghuizen. The road was removed afterwards.

Around 1750, the first school was built in Sellingen. In October 1964, a road was opened between Sellingen and Walchum. Despite protests by both municipalities, the border remained fenced off, because Germany did not want to establish a border post.

Sellingen used to be part of the municipality of Bourtange. In 1821, it became part of Vlagtwedde. Many people desired a more central location of the municipal council. In 1889, the council voted to move the seat to Sellingen. In 2017, Vlagtwedde merged into Westerwolde, however Sellingen is still one of the two seats.

== Nature ==
There was still a raised bog to the west of Sellingen. In the 1930s, the heath was cultivated, however 600 hectares (1,500 acres) of forest remained, and is known as the Sellingerbossen. It is somewhat random landscape with forests, meadows and swamps, and is known for its variety of damselflies.

The Hasseberg is located near the German border, and is the highest point in Groningen at 14.6 metres (48 ft).

== Notable people ==
- Geert Meijer (born 1951), footballer
- Anke de Vries (born 1936), children's book author

== Gallery ==
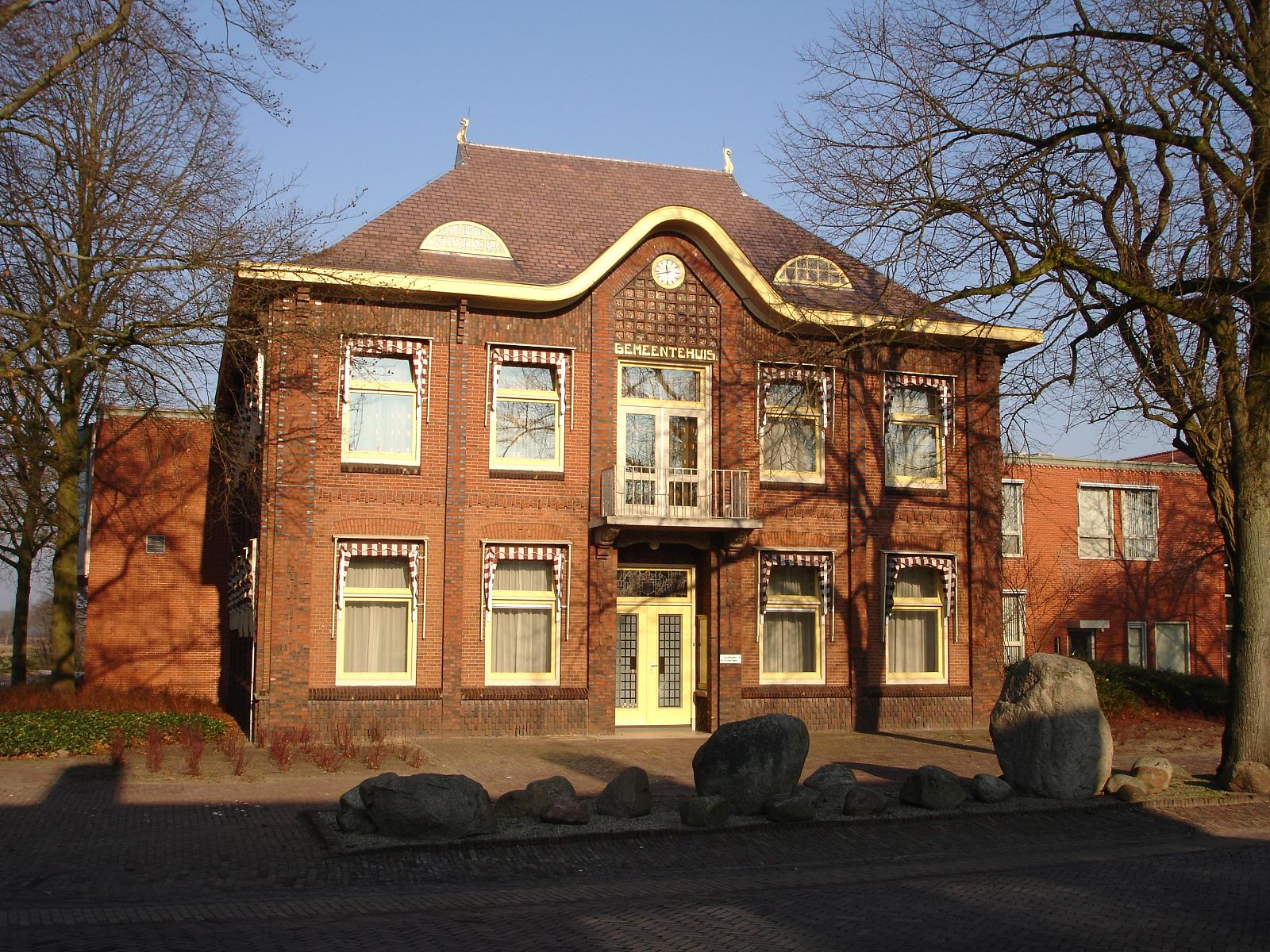
Municipal council

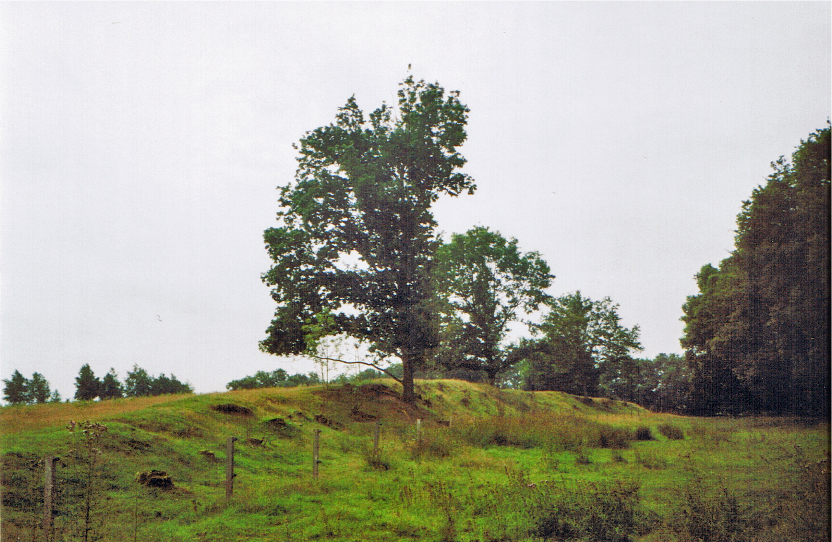
Hasseberg

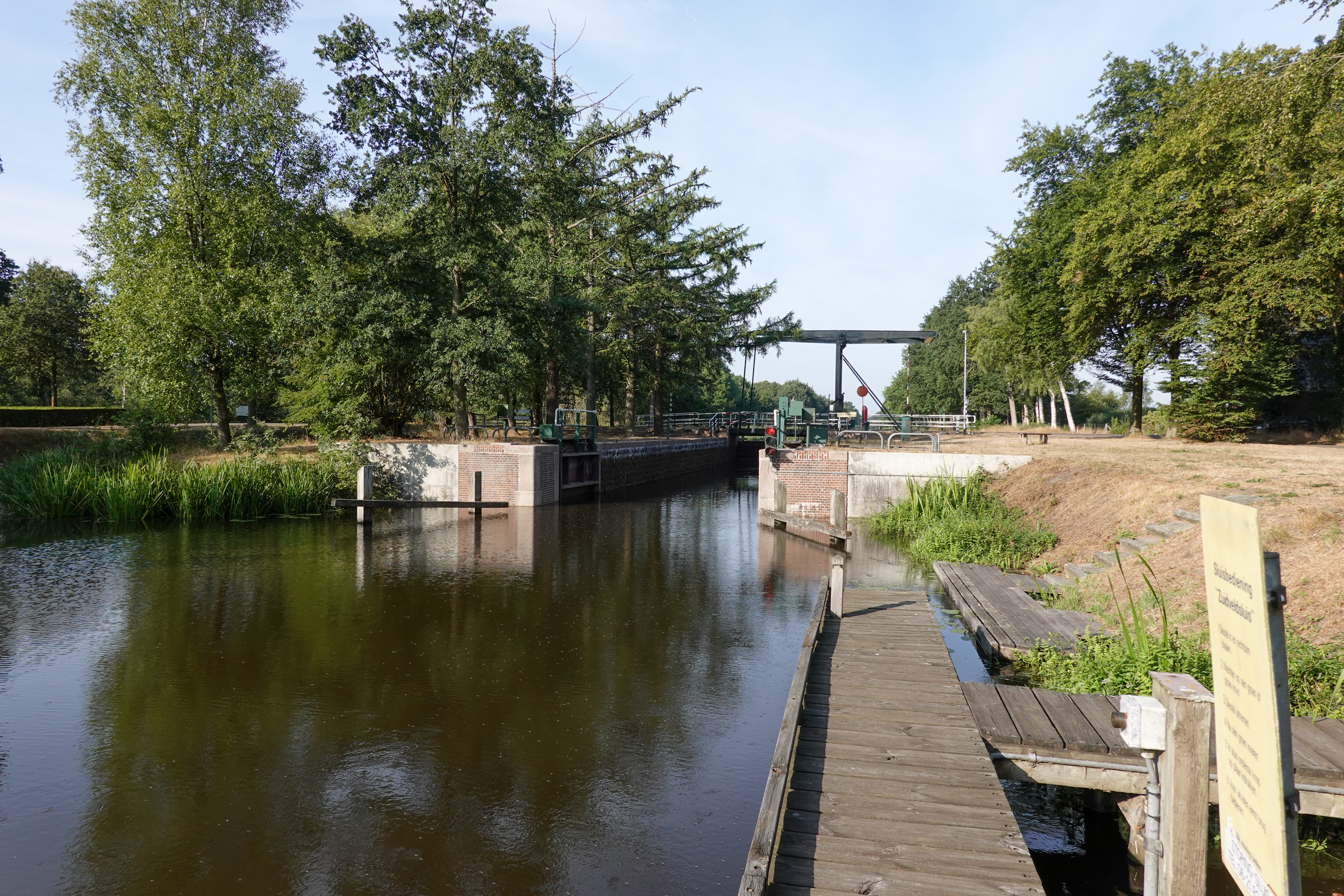
Sellingen (2018)

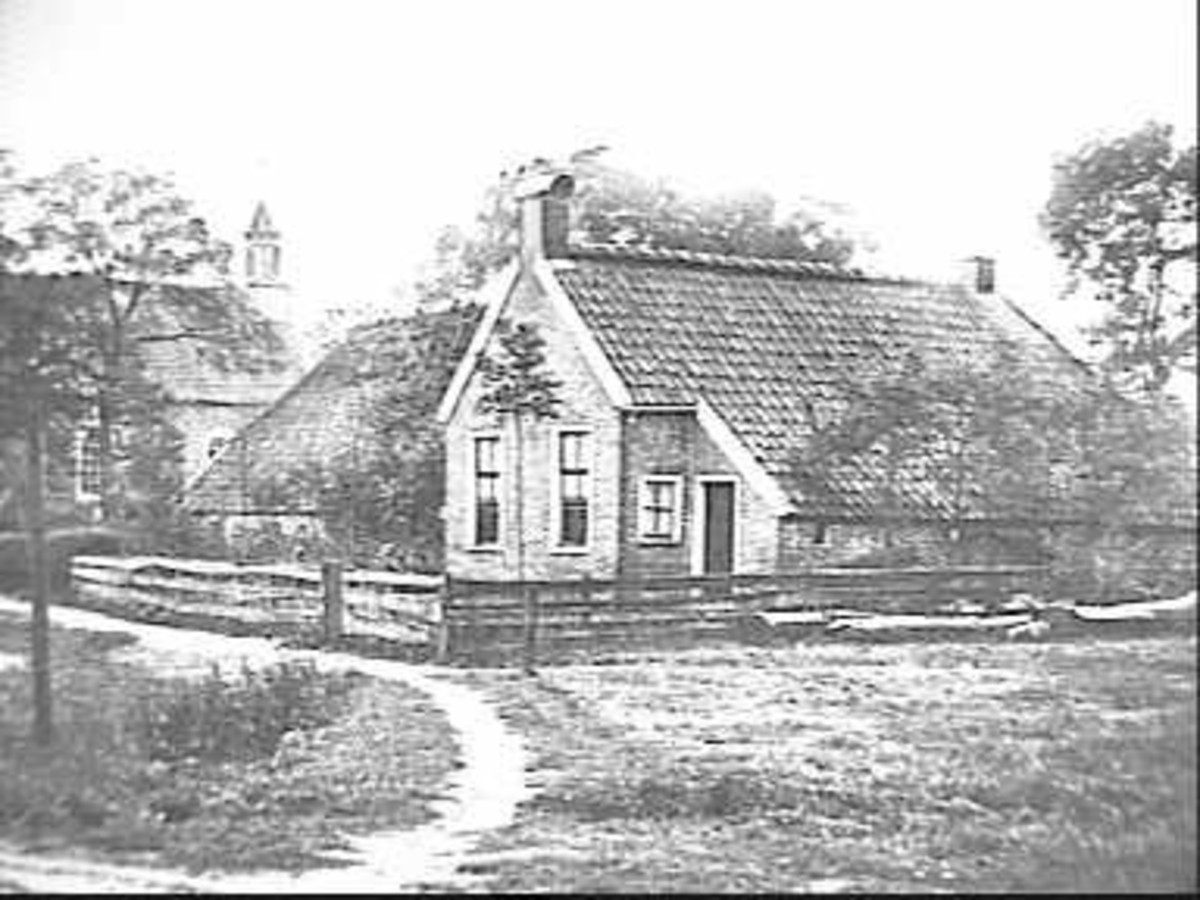
Sellingen (1927 or 28)
