= Bourtange =

- Village
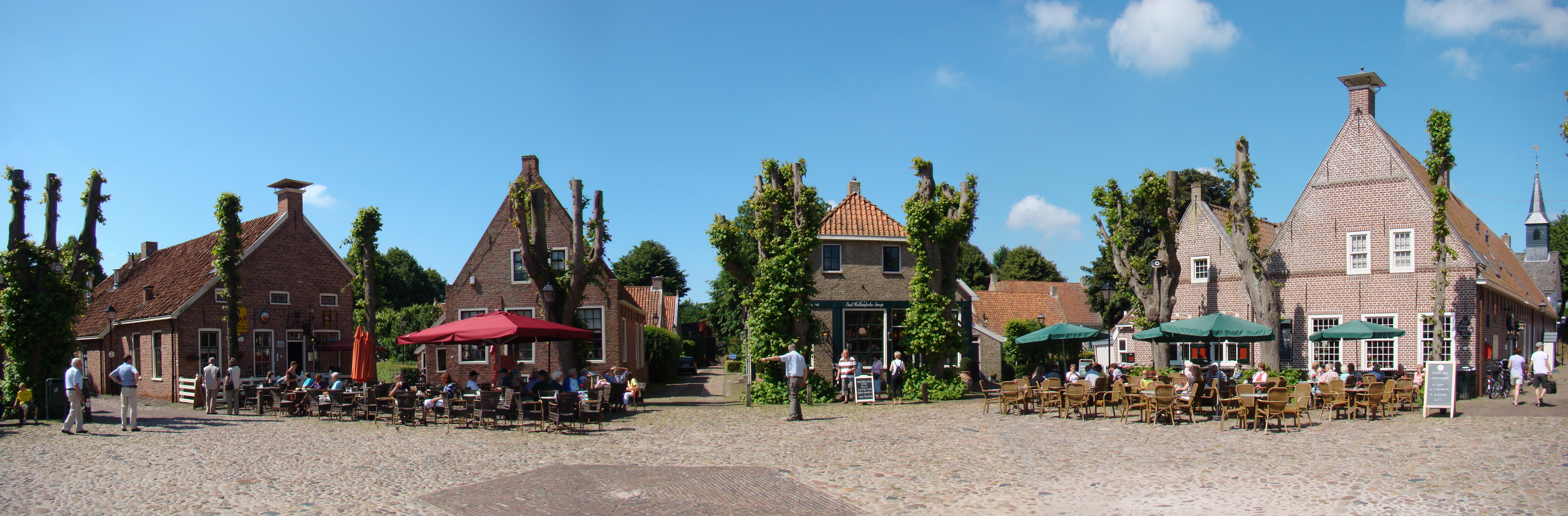
- Market square in the center of Fort Bourtange

- Flag

- Location in the province of Groningen Bourtange (Netherlands)
- Coordinates: 53.0066°N 7.1920°E
- Country: Netherlands
- Province: Groningen
- Municipality: Westerwolde

Area (2012)
  - Total: 159 ha (390 acres)
  - Land: 147 ha (360 acres)
  - Water: 12 ha (30 acres)

Population (2012)
  - Total: 430
  - Density: 290/km^{2} (760/sq mi)
- Time zone: UTC+1 (CET)
  - Summer (DST): UTC+2 (CEST)
- Postal code: 9545
- Area code: 0599
- ISO 3166 code: NL-GR

Bourtange (Dutch pronunciation: [ˌbuːrˈtɑŋə]; Gronings: Boertang) is a village with a population of 430 in the municipality of Westerwolde in the Netherlands. It is situated in the region Westerwolde in the east of the province of Groningen near the German border. Fort Bourtange was built in 1593 during the Dutch Revolt and was used until 1851. Between 1967 and 1992 the star fort was gradually restored to its mid-18th-century state and it is currently an open-air museum.

== Etymology ==
The name Bourtange comes from the Dutch word tange (sand ridge), because the settlement is situated on a strategically important sand ridge in the marshes of the Bourtange Moor.

== History ==
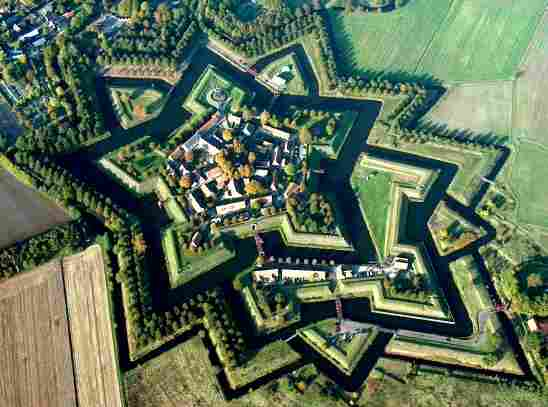
Bourtange fortification, restored to its 1750 state

Fort Bourtange was initially built during the Eighty Years' War (circa 1568–1648) when William I of Orange wanted to control the main road between Germany and the city of Groningen which was controlled by the Spanish. This road followed a sandy ridge (tange) through the marshes (the Bourtange Swamp).

Later, around 1594, Bourtange became part of the fortifications on the border between the northern provinces (Groningen, Friesland, Drenthe) and Germany.

Bourtange was a separate municipality until 1822, when it was merged with Vlagtwedde.

In 1851 the star fort was given up and Bourtange became a normal village.

Around 1960 living conditions in the village deteriorated and it was decided that Bourtange would be rebuilt to its state of 1740-1750. Today it is an open-air museum.

== Geography ==
Bourtange is located in the center of the municipality of Westerwolde and in the east of the province of Groningen near the German border. It is situated on a sand ridge in the Bourtange Moor, in the region of Westerwolde.

== Demographics ==
In 2001, the town of Bourtange had 267 inhabitants. The built-up area of the town was 0.21 km^{2}, and contained 133 residences. In 2005, the statistical area "Bourtange", which also can include the surrounding countryside, had a population of around 530.

As of 2012, Bourtange has a population of 430 and a population density of 270/km^{2} (700/sq mi).
