= Westerwolde (municipality) =

Municipality in the Netherlands

- Municipality
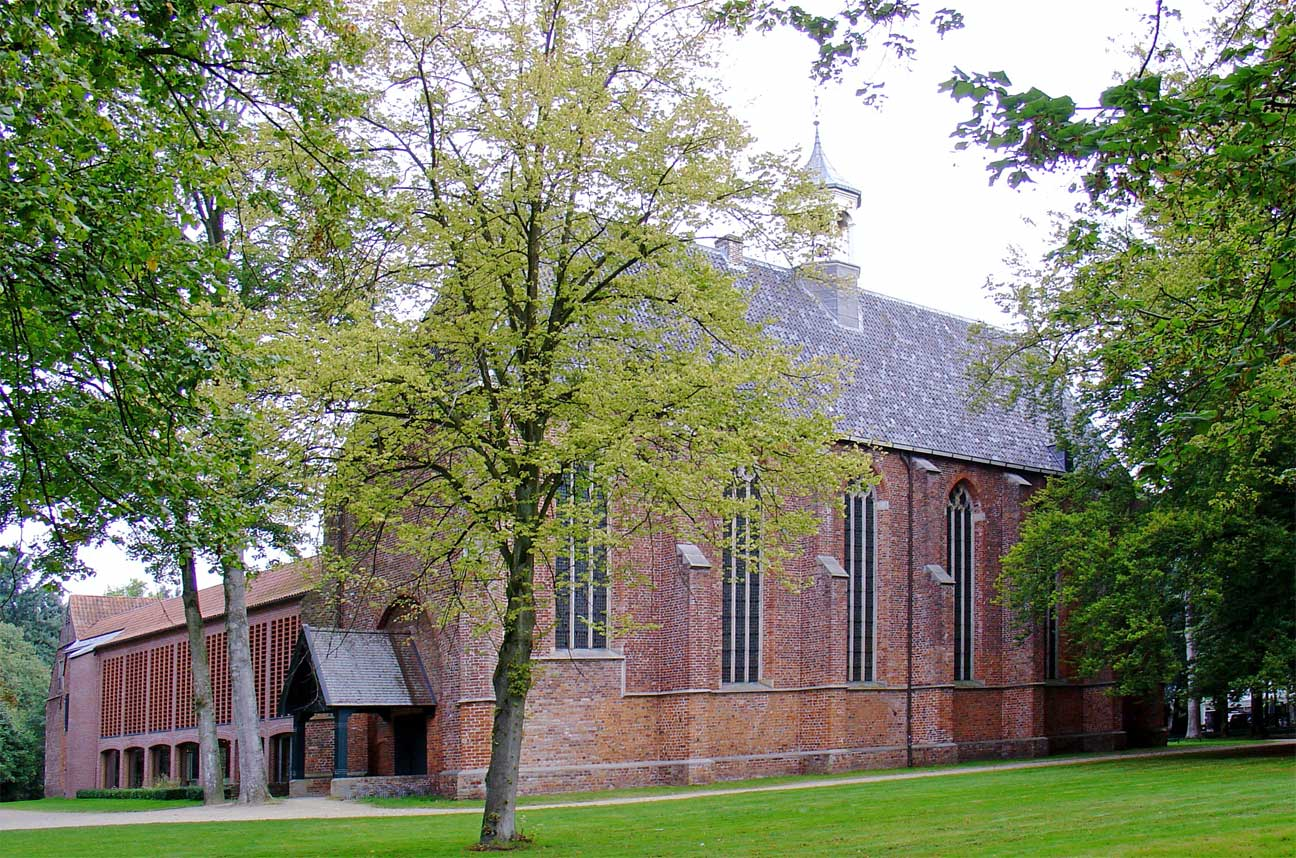
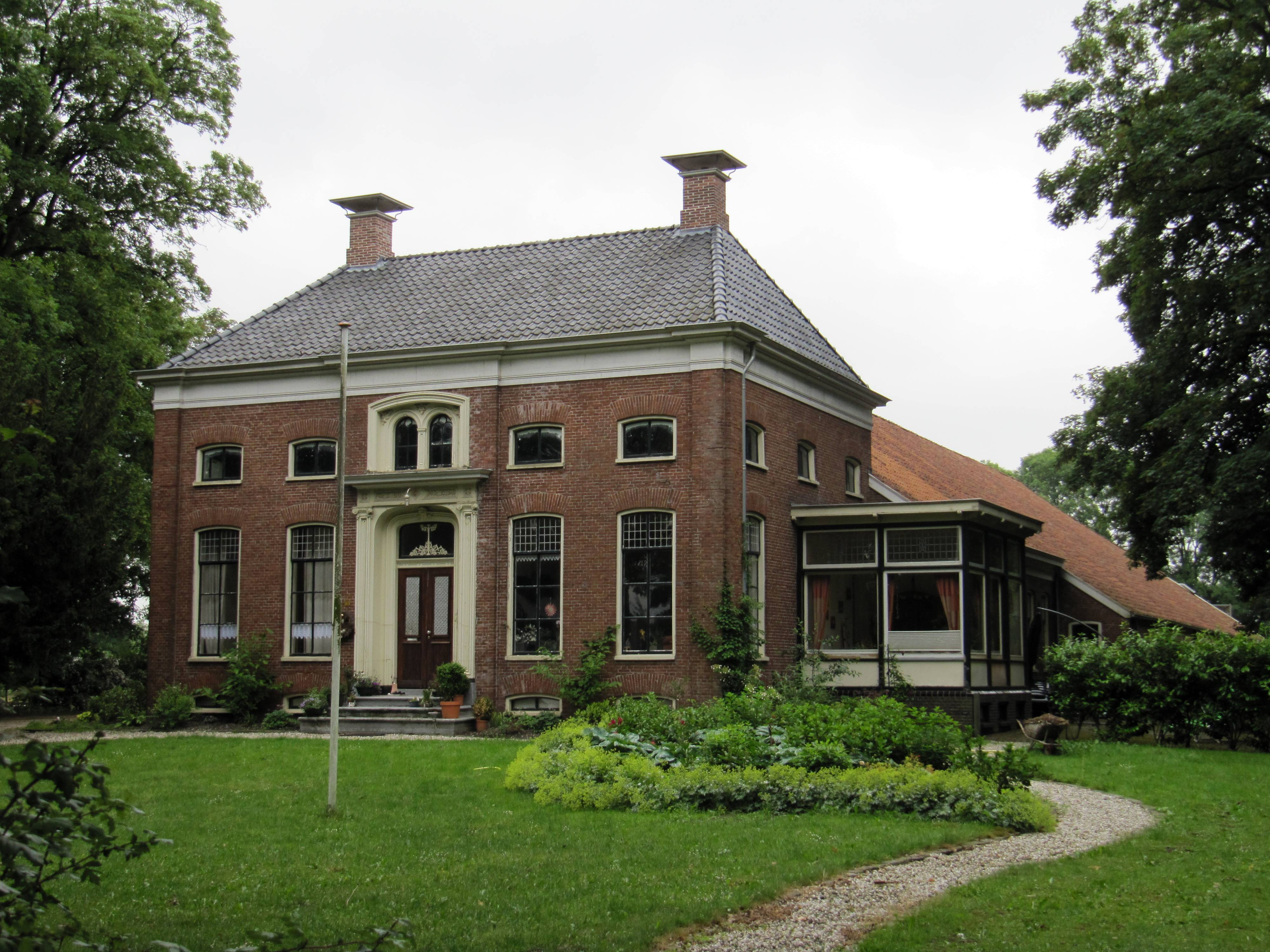
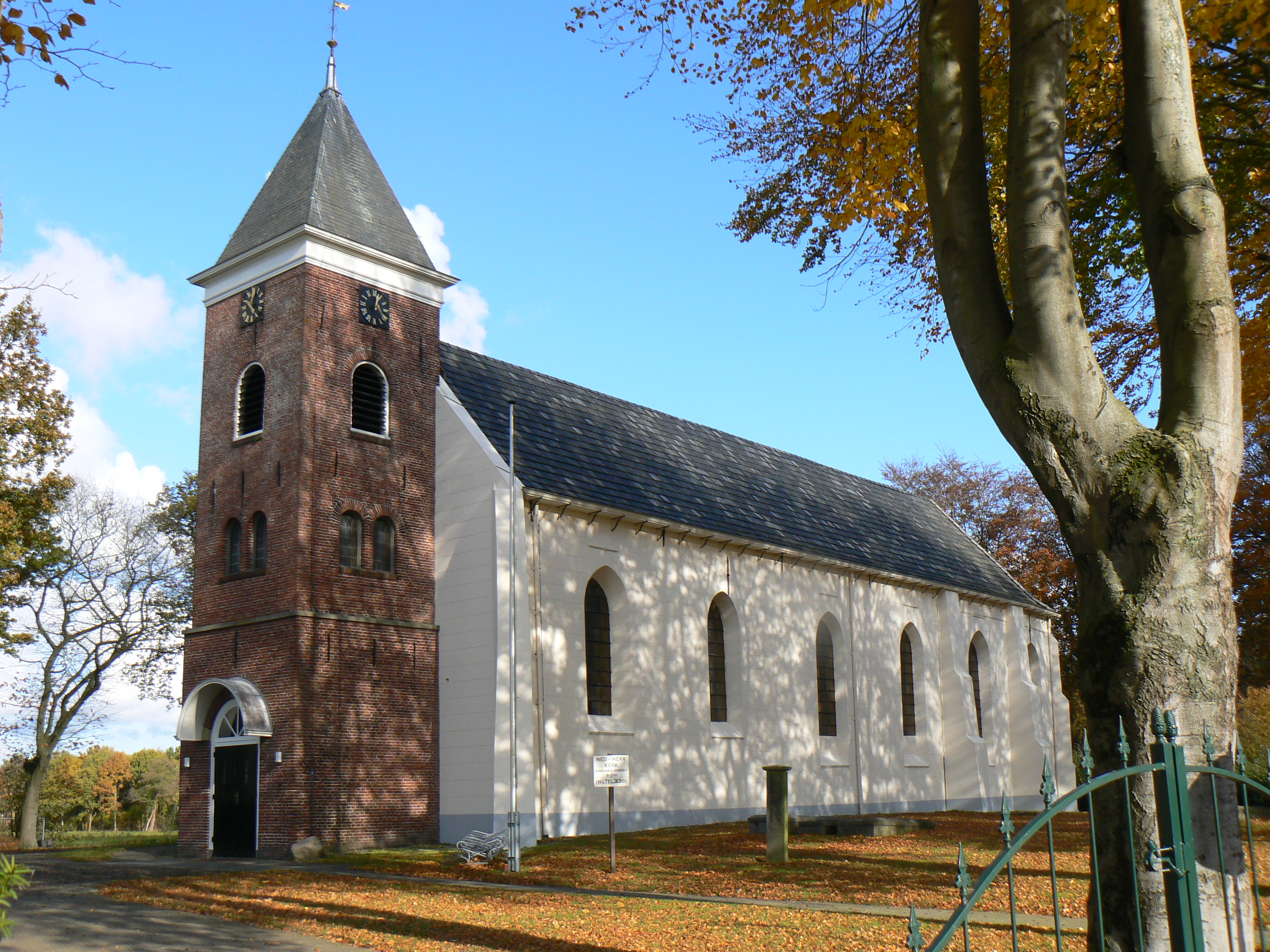
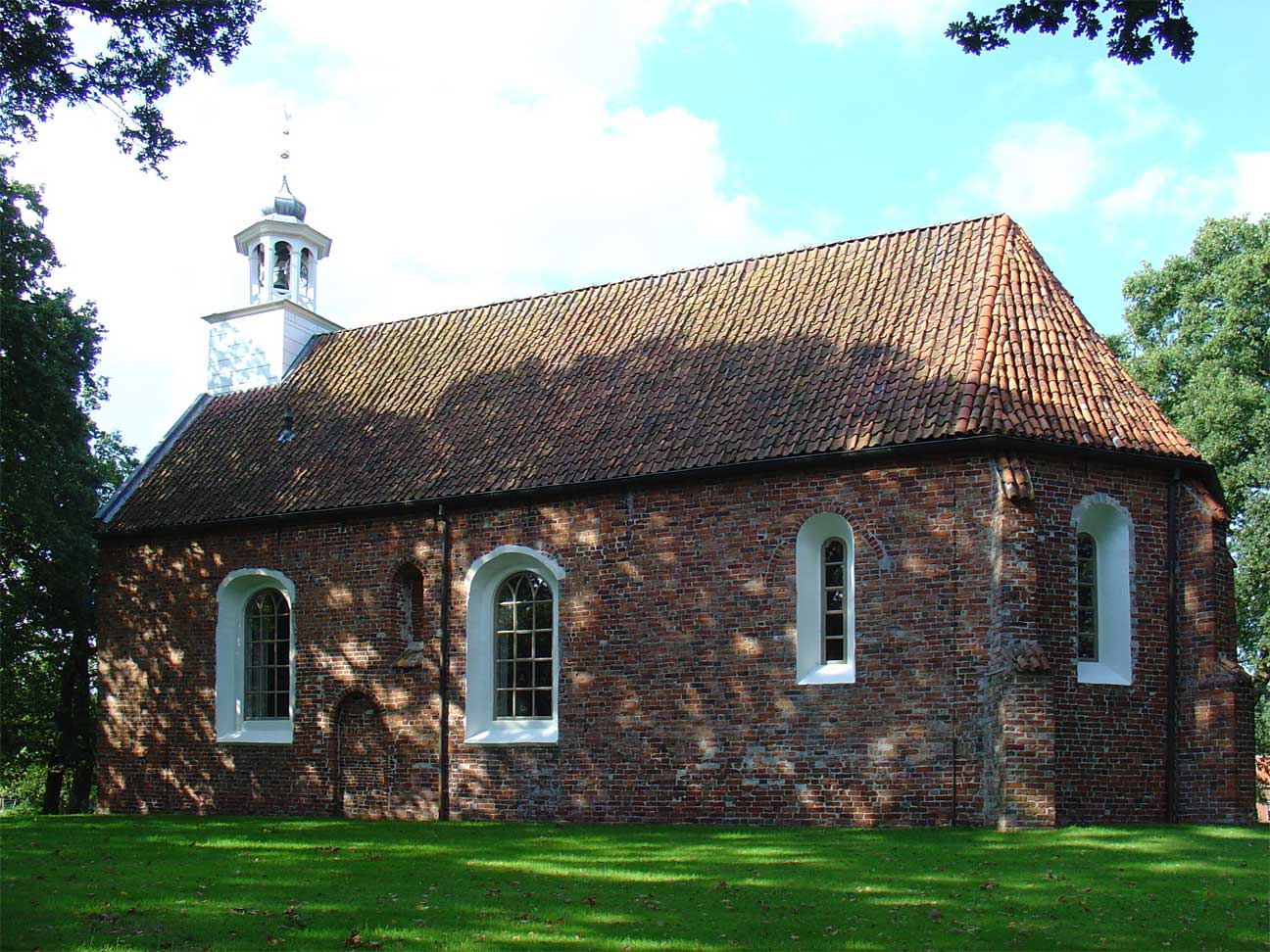
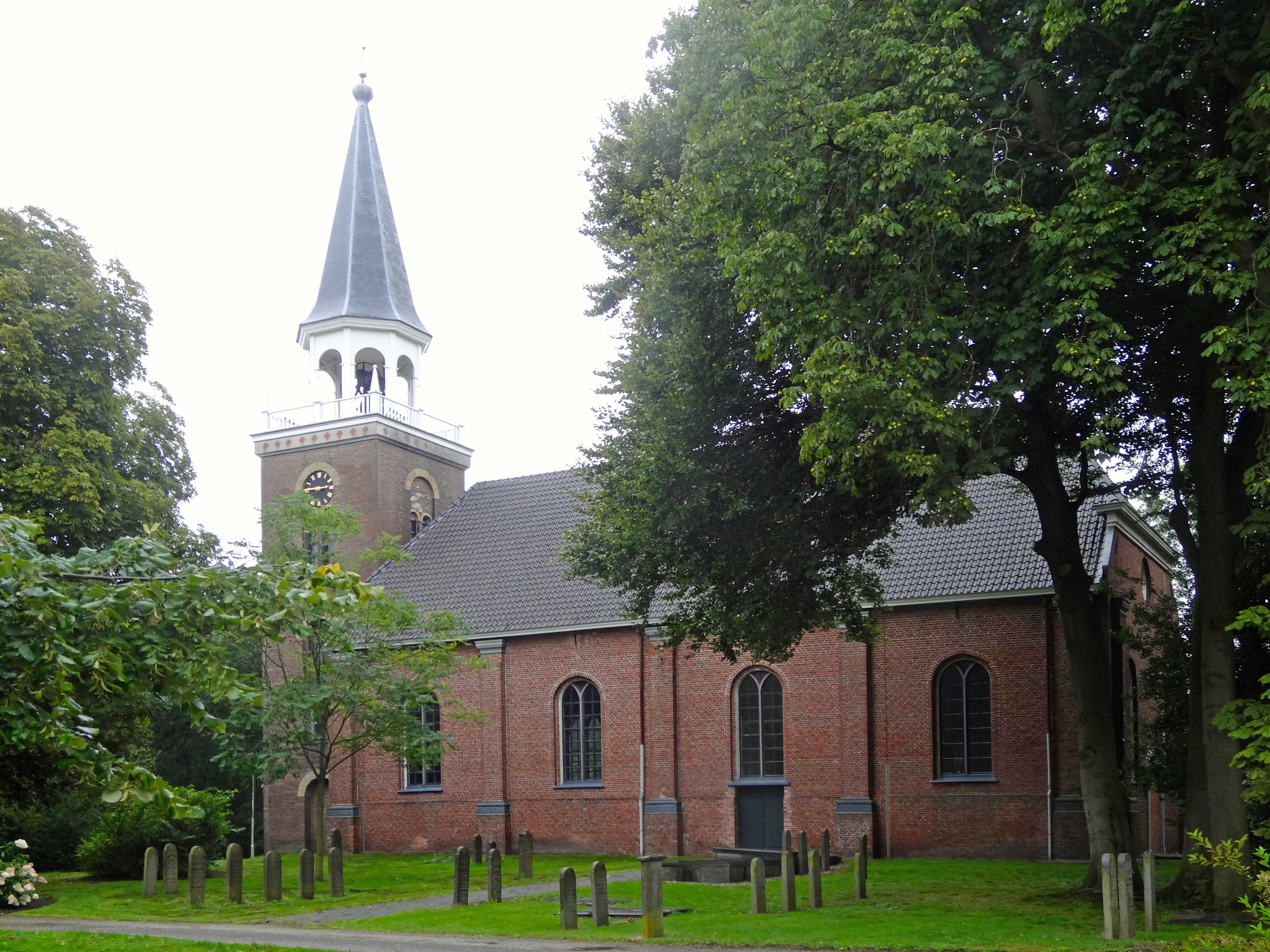
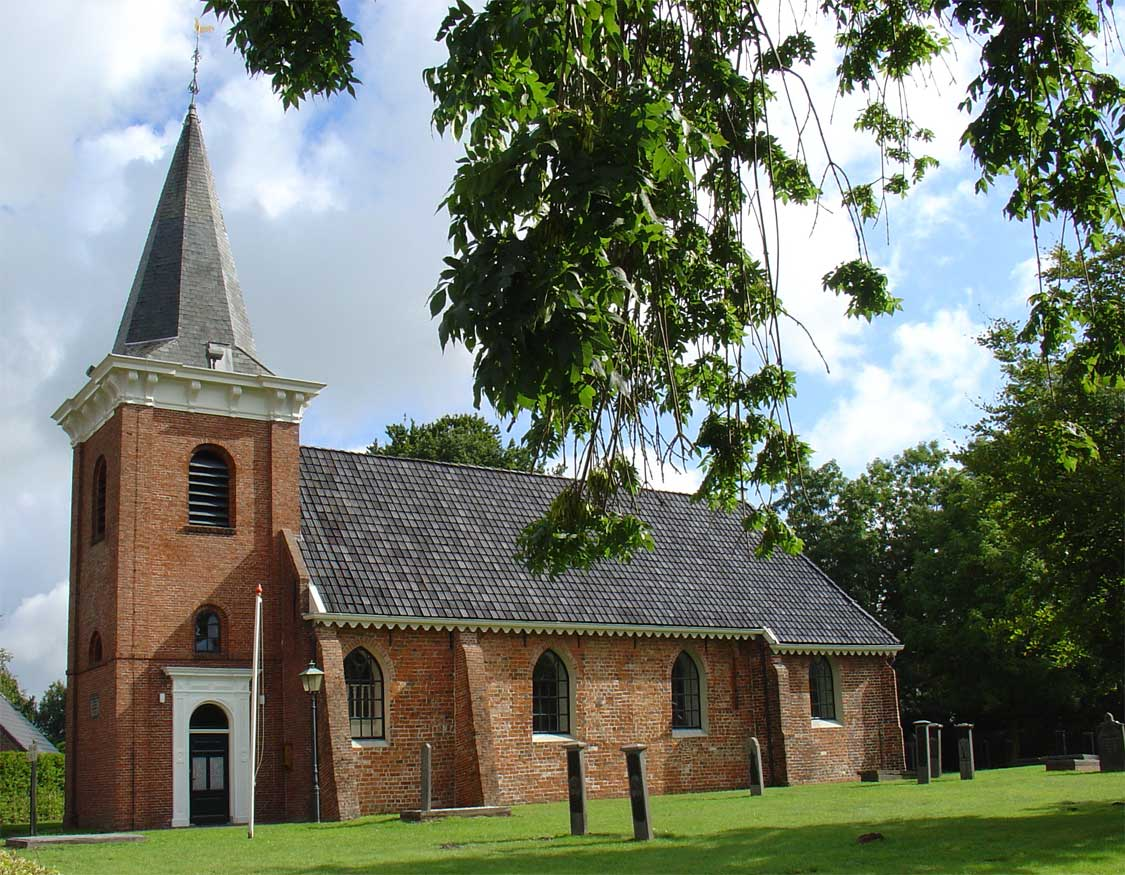
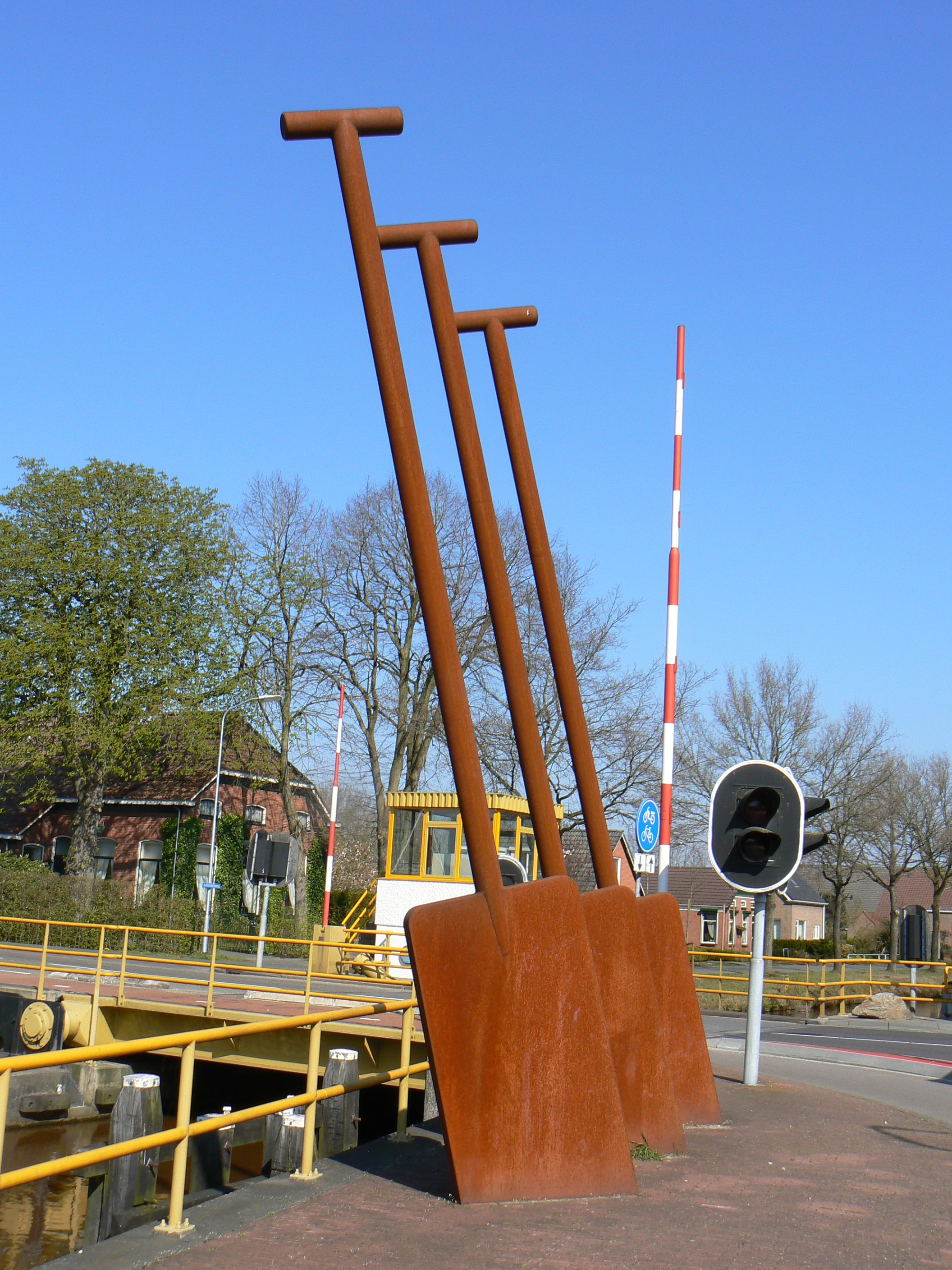
- Ter Apel Bellingwolde Vlagtwedde Sellingen Blijham Wedde Ter Apelkanaal

- Flag Coat of arms

- Location in Groningen
- Coordinates: 53.0281°N 7.1445°E
- Country: Netherlands
- Province: Groningen
- Established: 1 January 2018

Government
  - Body: Municipal council
  - Mayor: Jaap Velema (D66)
- Time zone: UTC+1 (CET)
  - Summer (DST): UTC+2 (CEST)
- Website: www.westerwolde.nl

Westerwolde (Dutch pronunciation: [ˌʋɛstərˈʋɔldə]; Gronings: Westerwoolde) is a municipality in the province of Groningen in the northeast of the Netherlands.

The municipalities of Bellingwedde and Vlagtwedde merged into the new municipality of Westerwolde on 1 January 2018. The municipality continues to use both town halls in Sellingen and Wedde.

== Geography ==
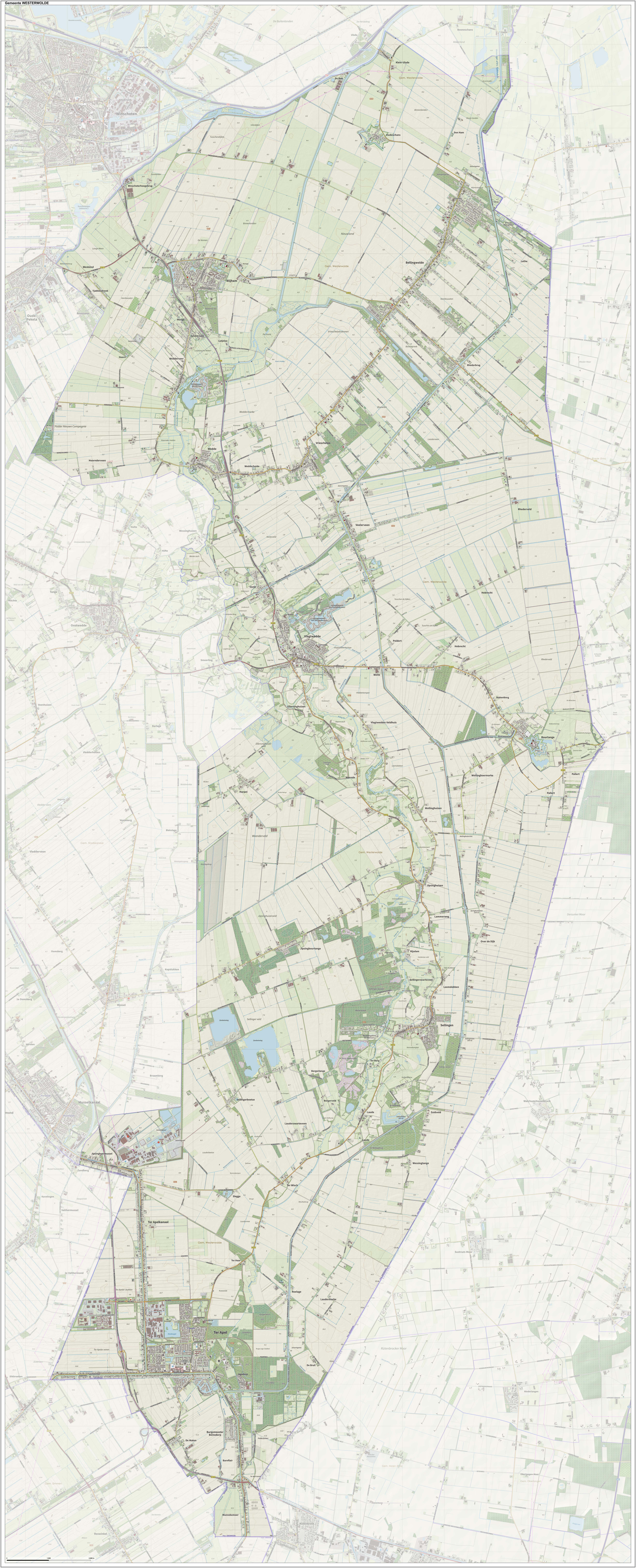
Map of the municipality

The municipality is located in the southeast of the province of Groningen at the border with Drenthe and in the northeast of the Netherlands at the border with Germany. Neighbouring municipalities in the Netherlands are Oldambt in the north, Pekela and Stadskanaal in the west, Borger-Odoorn in the southwest, and Emmen in the south. Neighbouring municipalities in Germany are Bunde in the northeast, Rhede, Dörpen, and Lathen in the east, and Haren in the southeast.

== Politics ==
On 22 November 2017, the first election was held for Westerwolde municipal council, with further elections held in March 2022 and March 2026. The result of the 2026 election is shown below. The council has 21 seats, the number determined by the population size.

Party	Popular vote		Seats
Party	Votes	%	Seats
Gemeentebelangen Westerwolde (GB)	1,969	18.4	4 / 21
Samen voor Westerwolde	1,737	16.23	4 / 21
Christian Democratic Appeal (CDA)	1,626	15.19	3 / 21
Party for Freedom (PVV)	1,322	12.35	3 / 21
Farmer–Citizen Movement (BBB)	1,112	10.39	2 / 21
GroenLinks (GL)	858	8.02	2 / 21
Labour Party (PvdA)	663	6.19	1 / 21
Democrats 66 (D66)	599	5.6	1 / 21
Westerwolde Lokaal	429	4.01	1 / 21

== Notable people ==
- Siert Bruins (1921, Weite – 2015) a Dutch member of the SS and SD during World War II
- Minze Stuiver (1929, Vlagtwedde – 2020) a geochemist and geoscience researcher especially in radiocarbon dating
- Jan Mulder (born 1945 in Bellingwolde) former footballer with 200 caps, writer, columnist and TV personality
- Geert Meijer (born 1951 in Sellingen) football manager and former professional player with 295 caps
- Anja Hazekamp (born 1968 in Vlagtwedde) politician and Member of the European Parliament
- Claudia Bokel (born 1973 in Ter Apel) a German épée fencer, silver medallist at the 2004 Summer Olympics
- Rindert van Zinderen Bakker (Ter Apel, 1912 – Almere Haven, 1993) member of the Dutch Resistance in WWII and politician

== Gallery ==
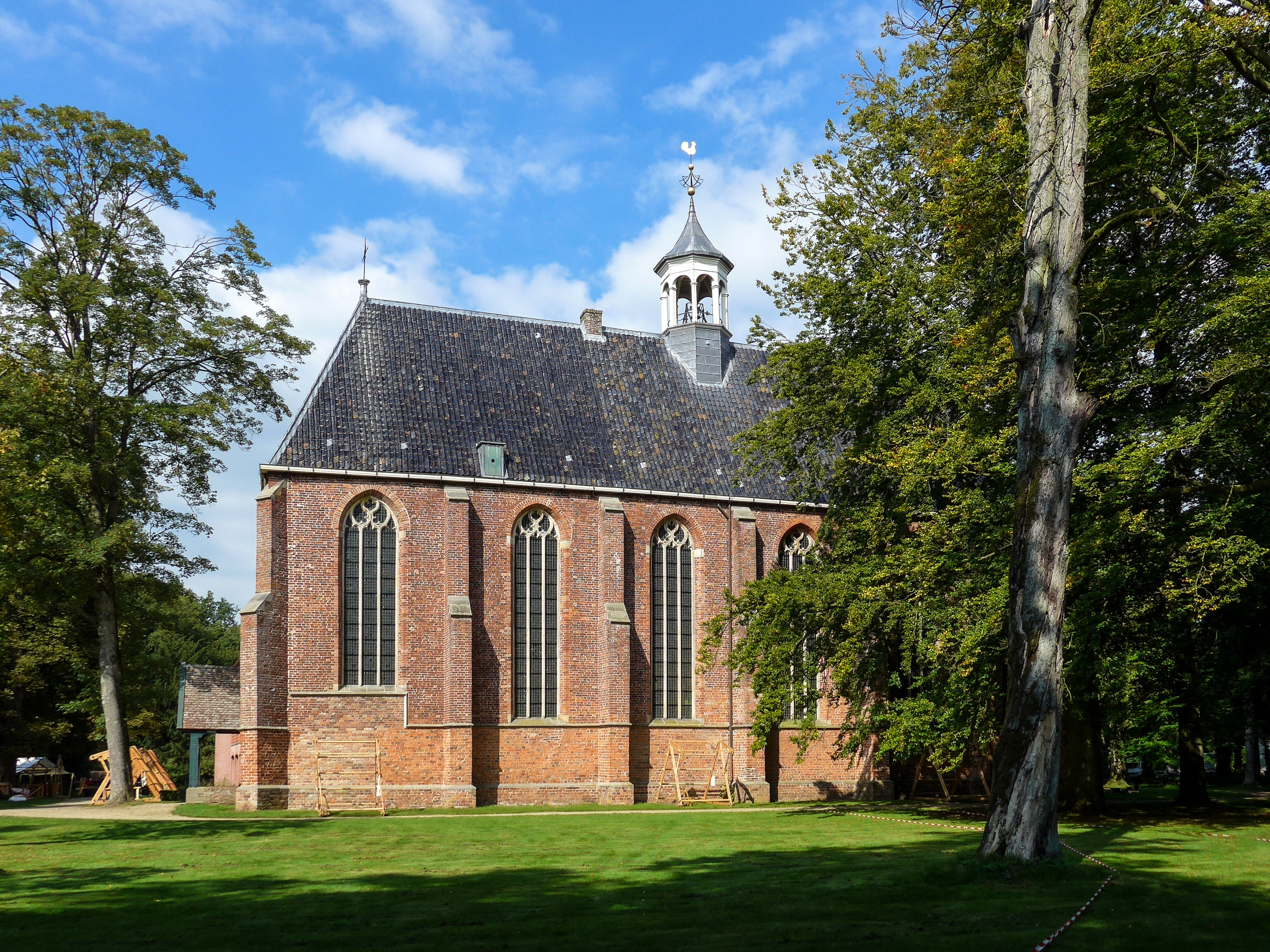
South side of the Ter Apel Monastery

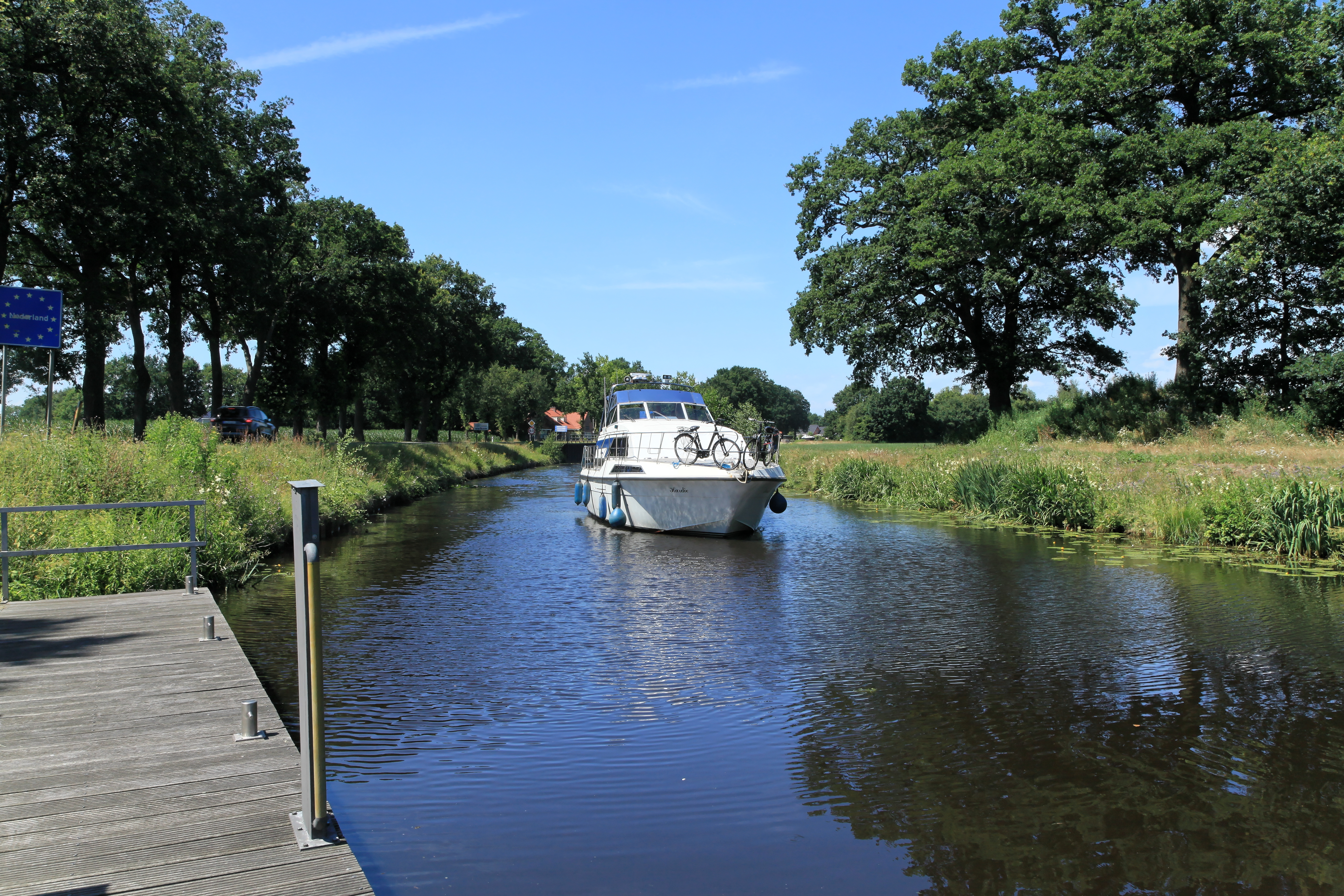
Haren-Ruitenbroek canal at German border, near Ter Apel

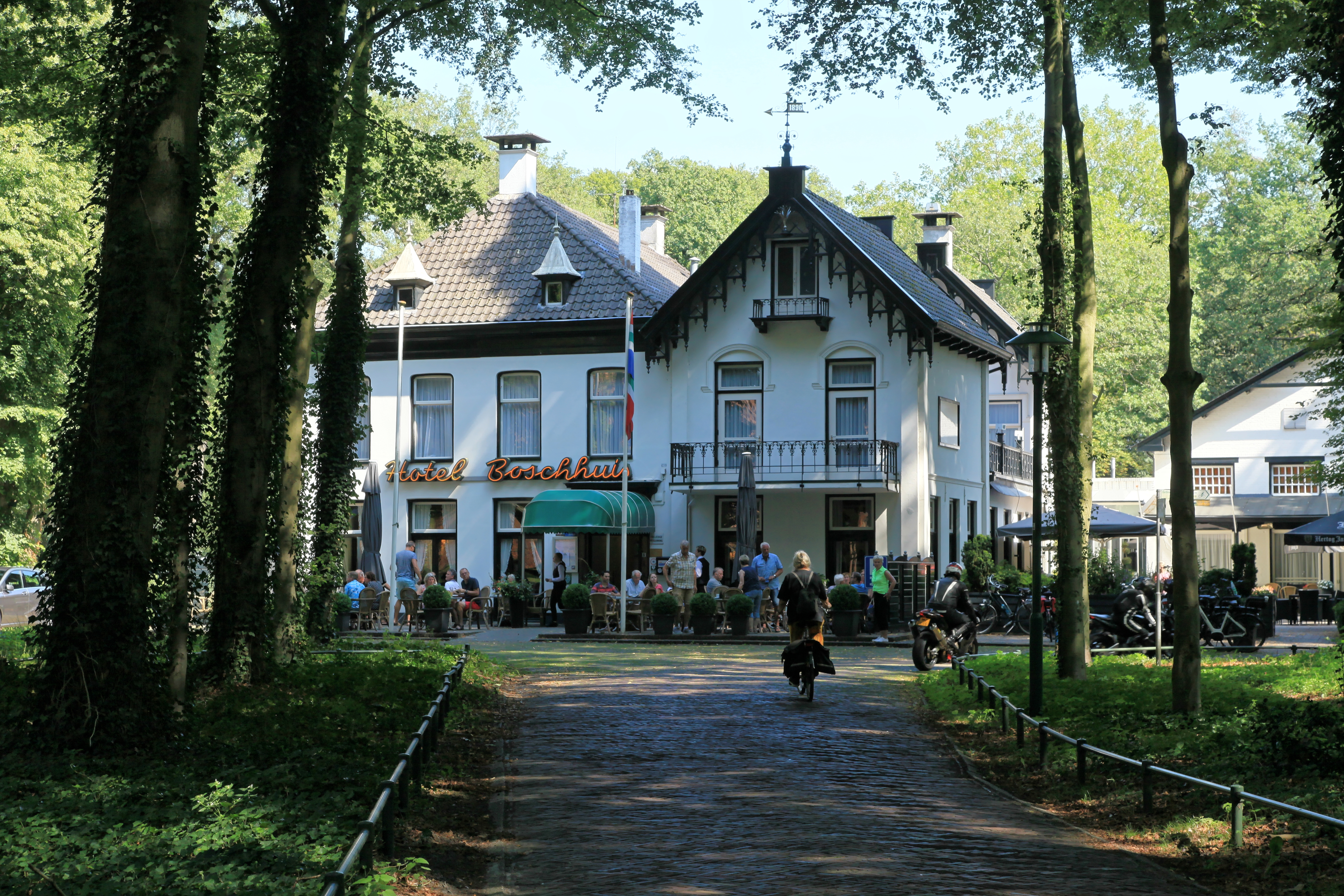
Boslaan with Hotel Boschhuis in Ter Apel

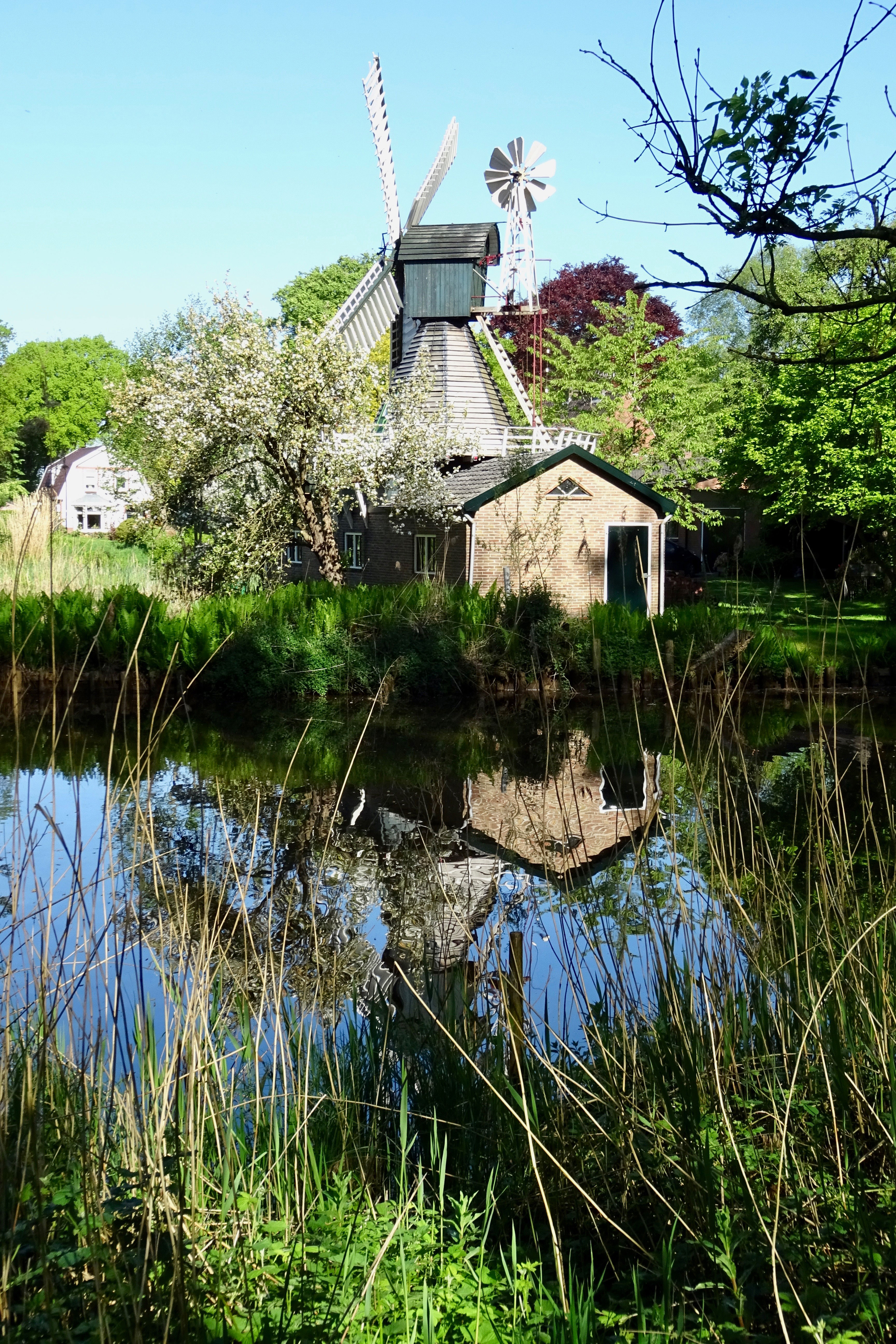
De Spinnenkop windmill in Wedderveer
