= List of cities, towns and villages in Groningen =

This is a list of settlements in the province of Groningen, in the Netherlands.

Name	Municipality	Coordinates
Aalsum	Westerkwartier	53°18′30″N 6°22′10″E
Achterdiep	Hoogezand-Sappemeer	53°10′20″N 6°47′20″E
Achter-Thesinge	Ten Boer	53°16′55″N 6°39′25″E
Adorp	Winsum	53°16′30″N 6°32′00″E
Aduard	Westerkwartier	53°15′25″N 6°27′35″E
Aduarderzijl	Westerkwartier	53°19′05″N 6°28′05″E
Agodorp	Vlagtwedde	52°52′20″N 7°05′00″E
Alinghuizen	Het Hogeland	53°18′45″N 6°30′05″E
Allersma	Westerkwartier	53°19′05″N 6°27′15″E
Alteveer	Stadskanaal	53°03′05″N 6°59′40″E
Amsweer	Eemsdelta	53°18′30″N 6°54′10″E
Appingedam	Eemsdelta	53°19′20″N 6°51′30″E
Arwerd	Eemsdelta	53°21′10″N 6°50′10″E
Baamsum	Eemsdelta	53°17′05″N 7°02′30″E
Baflo	Winsum	53°21′45″N 6°30′50″E
Bakkerom	Westerkwartier	53°12′00″N 6°19′30″E
Balmahuizen	Westerkwartier	53°16′20″N 6°22′10″E
Bareveld	Veendam	53°03′10″N 6°50′50″E
Barlage	Stadskanaal	53°00′45″N 7°03′20″E
Barnflair	Vlagtwedde	52°51′20″N 7°04′50″E
Bedum	Bedum	53°18′05″N 6°36′10″E
Beersterhoogen	Reiderland	53°11′00″N 7°08′00″E
Beerta	Reiderland	53°10′30″N 7°05′30″E
Bellingwolde	Bellingwedde	53°07′00″N 7°09′55″E
Beneden Veensloot	Menterwolde	53°07′50″N 6°55′25″E
Beswerd	Westerkwartier	53°17′05″N 6°27′35″E
Bethlehem	Het Hogeland	53°23′00″N 6°36′35″E
Bierum	Eemsdelta	53°23′00″N 6°51′35″E
Biessum	Eemsdelta	53°20′00″N 6°53′45″E
Bikkershorn	Oldambt	53°08′50″N 6°59′40″E
Blauw	Westerkwartier	53°07′40″N 6°22′05″E
Blekslage	Stadskanaal	52°59′25″N 7°03′50″E
Blijham	Bellingwedde	53°06′35″N 7°04′35″E
Blokum	Slochteren	53°15′35″N 6°43′10″E
Boerakker	Westerkwartier	53°11′15″N 6°19′40″E
Boerenstreek	Westerkwartier	53°06′55″N 6°20′45″E
Bolshuizen	Westerkwartier	53°18′00″N 6°28′45″E
Booneschans	Reiderland	53°09′45″N 7°10′20″E
Borgercompagnie	Veendam	53°07′25″N 6°48′50″E
Borgertange	Vlagtwedde	52°56′15″N 7°06′45″E
Borgerveld	Vlagtwedde	52°55′55″N 7°06′50″E
Borgsweer	Eemsdelta	53°17′55″N 7°00′45″E
Borgweg	Slochteren	53°10′45″N 6°42′45″E
Bourtange	Vlagtwedde	53°00′35″N 7°11′25″E
Boven Pekela	Pekela	53°02′00″N 6°56′00″E
Bovenrijge	Groningen	53°16′20″N 6°39′50″E
Bovenstreek	Scheemda	53°07′30″N 6°57′35″E
Boven Veensloot	Veendam	53°07′30″N 6°55′00″E
Breede	Eemsmond	53°23′10″N 6°32′15″E
Brillerij	Westerkwartier	53°17′15″N 6°28′55″E
Briltil	Westerkwartier	53°14′30″N 6°23′20″E
Broek	De Marne	53°23′35″N 6°25′30″E
Bronsveen	Pekela	53°06′05″N 7°02′20″E
Burgemeester Beinsdorp	Vlagtwedde	52°51′45″N 7°04′45″E
Dallingeweer	Eemsdelta	53°17′40″N 7°03′50″E
De Bruil	Vlagtwedde	52°52′30″N 7°06′35″E
De Bult	Bellingwedde	53°09′05″N 7°07′50″E
De Haar	Westerkwartier	53°07′50″N 6°13′25″E
De Har	Eemsdelta	53°20′25″N 6°41′10″E
De Haspel	Westerkwartier	53°06′15″N 6°20′20″E
De Holm	Westerkwartier	53°10′10″N 6°20′40″E
De Houw	De Marne	53°21′45″N 6°21′50″E
De Jammer	Westerkwartier	53°11′40″N 6°20′20″E
De Jouwer	Westerkwartier	53°12′25″N 6°18′15″E
Dekkershuizen	Eemsdelta	53°24′25″N 6°50′10″E
De Lethe	Bellingwedde	53°06′55″N 7°11′40″E
Delfzijl	Eemsdelta	53°19′50″N 6°55′05″E
De Maten	Vlagtwedde	52°51′35″N 7°03′40″E
Den Andel	Winsum	53°23′35″N 6°30′30″E
Denemarken	Midden-Groningen	53°13′45″N 6°47′05″E
Den Ham	Westerkwartier	53°16′25″N 6°25′40″E
Den Ham	Bellingwedde	53°08′10″N 7°10′00″E
Den Horn	Westerkwartier	53°13′40″N 6°26′40″E
De Paauwen	Slochteren	53°15′40″N 6°46′40″E
De Poffert	Westerkwartier	53°12′35″N 6°27′30″E
De Ruigewaard	Westerkwartier	53°18′05″N 6°18′45″E
De Snipperij	Westerkwartier	53°10′40″N 6°15′05″E
De Streek	Het Hogeland	53°24′30″N 6°38′20″E
De Wilp	Westerkwartier	53°07′00″N 6°15′20″E
Diepswal	Westerkwartier	53°14′00″N 6°23′40″E
Dijkum	Eemsdelta	53°22′20″N 6°44′05″E
Dingen	Het Hogeland	53°21′15″N 6°30′35″E
Doezum	Westerkwartier	53°12′05″N 6°14′55″E
Doodstil	Het Hogeland	53°23′30″N 6°40′25″E
Dorkwerd	Groningen	53°15′00″N 6°30′45″E
Dorp	Westerkwartier	53°14′20″N 6°14′00″E
Douwen	De Marne	53°20′55″N 6°23′35″E
Drieborg	Reiderland	53°12′25″N 7°10′55″E
Duurkenakker	Menterwolde	53°08′25″N 6°54′10″E
Dwarsdiep	Pekela	53°01′30″N 6°56′20″E
Eekwerd	Eemsdelta	53°19′35″N 6°47′50″E
Eekwerderdraai	Eemsdelta	53°18′50″N 6°47′45″E
Eenrum	De Marne	53°21′45″N 6°27′30″E
Eenum	Eemsdelta	53°20′20″N 6°46′55″E
Eextahaven	Scheemda	53°09′50″N 6°59′05″E
Eibersburen	Westerkwartier	53°14′55″N 6°15′40″E
Ekamp	Reiderland	53°10′25″N 7°03′45″E
Electra	Westerkwartier	53°18′50″N 6°21′20″E
Ellerhuizen	Het Hogeland	53°16′45″N 6°36′35″E
Ellersinghuizen	Vlagtwedde	53°01′10″N 7°06′40″E
Engelbert	Groningen	53°12′30″N 6°38′50″E
Englum	Westerkwartier	53°18′40″N 6°24′15″E
Enumatil	Westerkwartier	53°12′55″N 6°24′30″E
Enzelens	Eemsdelta	53°18′50″N 6°46′25″E
Eppenhuizen	Het Hogeland	53°22′50″N 6°41′50″E
Essen	Groningen	53°11′30″N 6°36′15″E
Ewer	De Marne	53°20′10″N 6°21′40″E
Ezinge	Westerkwartier	53°18′35″N 6°26′30″E
Faan	Westerkwartier	53°14′00″N 6°22′25″E
Farmsum	Eemsdelta	53°19′20″N 6°55′35″E
Feerwerd	Westerkwartier	53°18′20″N 6°27′55″E
Felland	Groningen	53°09′50″N 6°37′50″E
Fiemel	Eemsdelta	53°18′00″N 7°04′20″E
Finsterwolde	Reiderland	53°11′55″N 7°05′05″E
Foxham	Midden-Groningen	53°10′15″N 6°43′40″E
Foxhol	Midden-Groningen	53°05′15″N 6°43′05″E
Foxholsterbosch	Midden-Groningen	53°10′25″N 6°42′25″E
Fraamklap	Eemsdelta	53°20′20″N 6°38′10″E
Fransum	Westerkwartier	53°16′40″N 6°26′55″E
Froombosch	Slochteren	53°11′40″N 6°46′50″E
Frytum	Westerkwartier	53°16′55″N 6°23′00″E
Gaarkeuken	Westerkwartier	53°15′00″N 6°18′40″E
Gaarland	Slochteren	53°16′00″N 6°51′25″E
Ganzedijk	Reiderland	53°12′35″N 7°07′15″E
Garmerwolde	Groningen	53°14′50″N 6°39′00″E
Garnwerd	Westerkwartier	53°18′15″N 6°29′35″E
Garrelsweer	Eemsdelta	53°18′40″N 6°46′15″E
Garreweer	Eemsdelta	53°19′15″N 6°49′15″E
Garsthuizen	Eemsdelta	53°22′05″N 6°42′50″E
Geefsweer	Eemsdelta	53°18′30″N 6°56′10″E
Glimmen	Haren	53°08′20″N 6°37′45″E
Godlinze	Eemsdelta	53°22′20″N 6°48′50″E
Goldhoorn	Reiderland	53°12′05″N 7°04′15″E
Grijpskerk	Westerkwartier	53°15′45″N 6°18′30″E
Grijssloot	De Marne	53°22′25″N 6°23′00″E
Groningen	Groningen	53°13′10″N 6°34′00″E
Grootegast	Westerkwartier	53°12′45″N 6°16′25″E
Groot Maarslag	De Marne	53°20′20″N 6°27′10″E
Groot Wetsinge	Winsum	53°18′15″N 6°31′45″E
Hardeweer	Westerkwartier	53°17′00″N 6°26′25″E
Haren	Haren	53°10′15″N 6°36′50″E
Harkstede	Slochteren	53°12′45″N 6°41′55″E
Harpel	Vlagtwedde	53°00′00″N 7°05′20″E
Harssens	Winsum	53°15′50″N 6°32′35″E
Hebrecht	Vlagtwedde	53°02′15″N 7°09′50″E
Heereburen	Westerkwartier	53°17′00″N 6°21′05″E
Hefswal	Eemsmond	53°25′30″N 6°44′15″E
Heiligerlee	Scheemda	53°09′25″N 7°00′35″E
Heineburen	Westerkwartier	53°07′10″N 6°17′25″E
Hekkum	Winsum	53°17′10″N 6°31′00″E
Hellum	Slochteren	53°14′20″N 6°50′20″E
Helwerd	Eemsmond	53°23′25″N 6°37′05″E
Hemert	Ten Boer	53°18′30″N 6°42′30″E
Het Reidland	Bedum	53°17′45″N 6°38′15″E
Heveskes	Eemsdelta	53°18′35″N 6°57′55″E
Höchte	Stadskanaal	53°02′35″N 7°00′45″E
Hoekje	Westerkwartier	53°17′40″N 6°17′45″E
Hoeksmeer	Eemsdelta	53°17′50″N 6°47′00″E
Hoetmansmeer	Pekela	53°02′25″N 6°54′40″E
Hofte	Stadskanaal	53°03′00″N 7°03′40″E
Holte	Stadskanaal	53°03′25″N 7°02′55″E
Holwierde	Eemsdelta	53°21′30″N 6°52′25″E
Holwinde	Eemsmond	53°23′40″N 6°39′15″E
Honderd	Eemsdelta	53°23′05″N 6°44′40″E
Hongerige Wolf	Reiderland	53°12′55″N 7°08′00″E
Hoogezand	Hoogezand-Sappemeer	53°09′45″N 6°45′40″E
Hoogkerk	Groningen	53°12′40″N 6°30′05″E
Hoogwatum	Eemsdelta	53°23′30″N 6°52′50″E
Hoorn	Bellingwedde	53°05′35″N 7°03′00″E
Hoornderveen	Bellingwedde	53°04′05″N 7°02′25″E
Hoornsedijk	Haren	53°10′05″N 6°35′10″E
Hornhuizen	De Marne	53°23′20″N 6°21′40″E
Horsten	Stadskanaal	52°56′40″N 7°00′30″E
Houwerzijl	De Marne	53°20′10″N 6°20′25″E
Huizinge	Eemsdelta	53°20′45″N 6°40′25″E
Jagerswijk	Hoogezand-Sappemeer	53°10′15″N 6°48′45″E
Jipsingboermussel	Vlagtwedde	52°55′10″N 7°02′25″E
Jipsingboertange	Vlagtwedde	52°57′55″N 7°06′05″E
Jipsinghuizen	Vlagtwedde	52°58′40″N 7°09′00″E
Jonkersvaart	Westerkwartier	53°07′45″N 6°17′55″E
Jukwerd	Eemsdelta	53°20′05″N 6°50′45″E
Kaakhorn	De Marne	53°24′20″N 6°28′40″E
Kalkwijk	Hoogezand-Sappemeer	53°08′50″N 6°46′35″E
Kantens	Eemsmond	53°21′55″N 6°38′05″E
Katershorn	Eemsmond	53°24′55″N 6°39′25″E
Kenwerd	Westerkwartier	53°18′10″N 6°23′00″E
Kibbelgaarn	Veendam	53°06′50″N 6°57′35″E
Kiel-Windeweer	Hoogezand-Sappemeer	53°06′45″N 6°46′45″E
Klei	De Marne	53°22′00″N 6°20′40″E
Kleine Huisjes	De Marne	53°23′45″N 6°24′30″E
Kleinemeer	Hoogezand-Sappemeer	53°09′20″N 6°47′25″E
Klein Garnwerd	Winsum	53°18′25″N 6°30′10″E
Klein Harkstede	Slochteren	53°13′05″N 6°39′05″E
Klein-Ulsda	Bellingwedde	53°09′20″N 7°08′45″E
Klein Wetsinge	Winsum	53°18′05″N 6°31′55″E
Kloosterburen	De Marne	53°23′10″N 6°23′30″E
Kolham	Slochteren	53°11′00″N 6°44′40″E
Kolhol	Eemsdelta	53°23′45″N 6°46′35″E
Kommerzijl	Westerkwartier	53°17′10″N 6°19′30″E
Koningsoord	Eemsmond	53°26′05″N 6°48′05″E
Kopaf	Eemsdelta	53°15′35″N 6°57′15″E
Kopstukken	Stadskanaal	52°57′30″N 7°03′35″E
Korengarst	Menterwolde	53°12′55″N 6°52′45″E
Korhorn	Westerkwartier	53°18′00″N 6°21′35″E
Kornhorn	Westerkwartier	53°10′55″N 6°14′35″E
Korte Akkers	Veendam	53°07′25″N 6°54′20″E
Kostverloren	Reiderland	53°12′50″N 7°09′50″E
Krassum	Westerkwartier	53°18′00″N 6°29′30″E
Krewerd	Eemsdelta	53°21′15″N 6°50′55″E
Kroddeburen	Ten Boer	53°18′05″N 6°43′30″E
Kromme Elleboog	Reiderland	53°11′30″N 7°04′15″E
Kropswolde	Hoogezand-Sappemeer	53°08′35″N 6°43′25″E
Kruiselwerk	Pekela	53°03′55″N 6°59′20″E
Kruisweg	De Marne	53°23′20″N 6°22′30″E
Kuzemer	Westerkwartier	53°12′50″N 6°20′00″E
Kuzemerbalk	Westerkwartier	53°12′55″N 6°18′40″E
Lageland	Slochteren	53°14′20″N 6°42′50″E
Lageweg	Ten Boer	53°15′15″N 6°38′45″E
Lalleweer	Eemsdelta	53°17′25″N 7°00′25″E
Lammerburen	Westerkwartier	53°18′45″N 6°21′45″E
Lammerweg	Vlagtwedde	52°58′10″N 7°09′10″E
Laskwerd	Eemsdelta	53°17′35″N 6°50′45″E
Laude	Vlagtwedde	52°55′40″N 7°07′45″E
Laudermarke	Vlagtwedde	52°53′10″N 7°06′55″E
Lauderzwarteveen	Vlagtwedde	52°55′30″N 7°06′25″E
Lauwersoog	De Marne	53°24′30″N 6°11′55″E
Lauwerzijl	Westerkwartier	53°18′40″N 6°17′45″E
Leegkerk	Groningen	53°13′45″N 6°29′20″E
Leek	Westerkwartier	53°09′45″N 6°22′35″E
Leemdobben	Vlagtwedde	52°57′10″N 7°09′15″E
Leens	De Marne	53°21′35″N 6°22′45″E
Leermens	Eemsdelta	53°20′40″N 6°47′55″E
Lellens	Ten Boer	53°18′05″N 6°42′35″E
Lettelbert	Westerkwartier	53°11′25″N 6°24′40″E
Loppersum	Eemsdelta	53°19′55″N 6°44′50″E
Losdorp	Eemsdelta	53°22′35″N 6°50′10″E
Lucaswolde	Westerkwartier	53°11′05″N 6°18′00″E
Luddeweer	Slochteren	53°15′10″N 6°44′25″E
Lula	Hoogezand-Sappemeer	53°07′35″N 6°47′25″E
Lutjegast	Westerkwartier	53°14′00″N 6°15′30″E
Lutjeloo	Bellingwedde	53°05′40″N 7°05′10″E
Lutjerijp	Eemsdelta	53°21′25″N 6°48′15″E
Lutjewijtwerd	Eemsdelta	53°18′35″N 6°41′50″E
Lutjewolde	Ten Boer	53°17′35″N 6°39′05″E
Maarhuizen	Winsum	53°20′30″N 6°29′25″E
Martenshoek	Hoogezand-Sappemeer	53°09′45″N 6°43′50″E
Marum	Westerkwartier	53°08′40″N 6°15′45″E
Meeden	Menterwolde	53°08′25″N 6°55′35″E
Meedhuizen	Eemsdelta	53°17′05″N 6°54′40″E
Meerland	Scheemda	53°10′40″N 7°02′40″E
Meerstad	Groningen	53°13′21″N 6°39′11″E
Meerwijck	Hoogezand-Sappemeer	53°08′45″N 6°42′45″E
Mensingeweer	De Marne	53°21′05″N 6°27′55″E
Merum	Eemsdelta	53°19′00″N 6°45′30″E
Middelbert	Groningen	53°13′20″N 6°38′10″E
Middelstum	Eemsdelta	53°20′50″N 6°38′30″E
Midwolda	Scheemda	53°11′40″N 7°00′50″E
Midwolde	Westerkwartier	53°10′50″N 6°23′20″E
Modderland	Reiderland	53°11′55″N 7°06′35″E
Molenrij	De Marne	53°23′15″N 6°24′20″E
Morige	Bellingwedde	53°05′55″N 7°04′10″E
Munnekemoer	Vlagtwedde	52°50′40″N 7°04′55″E
Muntendam	Menterwolde	53°08′05″N 6°52′10″E
Mussel	Stadskanaal	52°57′20″N 7°02′20″E
Musselkanaal	Stadskanaal	52°55′55″N 7°00′55″E
Nansum	Eemsdelta	53°21′30″N 6°53′15″E
Napels	Scheemda	53°09′00″N 7°00′35″E
Niebert	Westerkwartier	53°09′40″N 6°19′40″E
Niehove	Westerkwartier	53°17′25″N 6°22′00″E
Niekerk	Westerkwartier	53°13′30″N 6°21′10″E
Niekerk	De Marne	53°20′35″N 6°19′45″E
Niesoord	Scheemda	53°11′15″N 7°01′30″E
Nieuw-Beerta	Reiderland	53°11′25″N 7°09′45″E
Nieuwe Compagnie	Hoogezand-Sappemeer	53°07′50″N 6°45′30″E
Nieuwe Pekela	Pekela	53°04′45″N 6°57′55″E
Nieuweschans	Reiderland	53°10′50″N 7°12′30″E
Nieuwe Statenzijl	Reiderland	53°13′50″N 7°12′25″E
Nieuwklap	Groningen	53°14′15″N 6°28′50″E
Nieuwolda	Scheemda	53°14′40″N 6°58′30″E
Nieuwolda-Oost	Scheemda	53°14′55″N 7°00′05″E
Nieuw-Scheemda	Scheemda	53°12′35″N 6°56′40″E
Nieuwstad	Eemsdelta	53°24′10″N 6°52′45″E
Niezijl	Westerkwartier	53°16′00″N 6°20′25″E
Nijenklooster	De Marne	53°22′30″N 6°25′10″E
Nijenklooster	Eemsdelta	53°20′40″N 6°50′50″E
Nooitgedacht	Eemsdelta	53°25′05″N 6°50′50″E
Noordbroek	Menterwolde	53°11′40″N 6°52′25″E
Noordbroeksterhamrik	Menterwolde	53°12′45″N 6°54′30″E
Noorddijk	Groningen	53°14′40″N 6°37′40″E
Noorderburen	Westerkwartier	53°16′25″N 6°23′50″E
Noorderhoogebrug	Groningen	53°14′45″N 6°34′05″E
Noordhorn	Westerkwartier	53°15′40″N 6°23′45″E
Noordhornerga	Westerkwartier	53°15′05″N 6°22′20″E
Noordhornertolhek	Westerkwartier	53°15′15″N 6°22′40″E
Noordlaren	Haren	53°07′15″N 6°40′00″E
Noordpolderzijl	Eemsmond	53°25′55″N 6°34′55″E
Noordwijk	Westerkwartier	53°10′15″N 6°15′25″E
Noordwolde	Bedum	53°16′20″N 6°35′20″E
Nuis	Westerkwartier	53°09′05″N 6°18′20″E
Numero Dertien	Veendam	53°03′00″N 6°55′10″E
Okswerd	Westerkwartier	53°15′45″N 6°21′40″E
Oldehove	Westerkwartier	53°18′10″N 6°23′45″E
Oldekerk	Westerkwartier	53°13′10″N 6°20′25″E
Oldenklooster	Eemsdelta	53°21′55″N 6°51′10″E
Oldenzijl	Eemsmond	53°23′35″N 6°42′50″E
Oldorp	Eemsmond	53°24′10″N 6°39′10″E
Oling	Eemsdelta	53°18′50″N 6°50′00″E
Ommelanderwijk	Veendam	53°05′20″N 6°54′20″E
Onderdendam	Bedum	53°20′05″N 6°35′25″E
Onderwierum	Bedum	53°19′40″N 6°34′50″E
Onnen	Haren	53°09′25″N 6°38′30″E
Onstwedde	Stadskanaal	53°02′05″N 7°02′25″E
Oomsberg	Stadskanaal	52°58′00″N 7°01′25″E
Oosteinde	Eemsmond	53°24′55″N 6°47′40″E
Oostereinde	Winschoten	53°09′30″N 7°03′20″E
Oosternieland	Eemsmond	53°24′05″N 6°45′20″E
Oosterwijtwerd	Eemsdelta	53°20′20″N 6°48′50″E
Oosterzand	Westerkwartier	53°14′05″N 6°19′20″E
Oostindië	Westerkwartier	53°08′05″N 6°22′20″E
Oostum	Westerkwartier	53°16′50″N 6°29′55″E
Oostwold	Westerkwartier	53°12′05″N 6°26′25″E
Oostwold	Scheemda	53°12′10″N 7°02′45″E
Opende	Westerkwartier	53°10′25″N 6°11′55″E
Opmeeden	Eemsdelta	53°16′35″N 6°55′00″E
Opwierde	Eemsdelta	53°18′50″N 6°52′25″E
Oudedijk	De Marne	53°24′25″N 6°27′40″E
Oude Pekela	Pekela	53°06′15″N 7°00′35″E
Oude Roodehaan	Groningen	53°12′30″N 6°37′15″E
Oudeschans	Bellingwedde	53°08′15″N 7°08′25″E
Oudeschip	Eemsmond	53°25′45″N 6°49′35″E
Oudezijl	Reiderland	53°11′20″N 7°11′55″E
Over de Dijk	Vlagtwedde	52°58′45″N 7°10′15″E
Overschild	Slochteren	53°16′55″N 6°47′05″E
Paddepoel	Groningen	53°15′20″N 6°31′25″E
Pallert	Vlagtwedde	52°59′45″N 7°12′10″E
Pasop	Westerkwartier	53°12′20″N 6°23′20″E
Peebos	Westerkwartier	53°11′55″N 6°13′50″E
Peizerweg	Groningen	53°12′10″N 6°31′20″E
Pieterburen	De Marne	53°24′00″N 6°27′10″E
Pieterzijl	Westerkwartier	53°16′55″N 6°16′10″E
Poldert	Vlagtwedde	53°01′50″N 7°08′30″E
Polen	Eemsdelta	53°24′45″N 6°51′30″E
Ranum	Winsum	53°20′40″N 6°30′35″E
Rasquert	Winsum	53°22′05″N 6°31′00″E
Rhederbrug	Bellingwedde	53°05′20″N 7°10′05″E
Rhederveld	Bellingwedde	53°03′50″N 7°11′05″E
Rijsdam	Vlagtwedde	52°57′45″N 7°08′40″E
Roelage	Vlagtwedde	52°53′30″N 7°05′50″E
Roodehaan	De Marne	53°19′45″N 6°25′40″E
Roodehaan	Groningen	53°11′30″N 6°38′20″E
Roodeschool	Eemsmond	53°25′15″N 6°46′00″E
Rottum	Eemsmond	53°23′00″N 6°37′15″E
Ruigezand	Westerkwartier	53°18′35″N 6°19′10″E
Ruischerbrug	Groningen	53°13′55″N 6°38′15″E
Ruiten	Slochteren	53°12′05″N 6°45′55″E
Saaksum	Westerkwartier	53°18′50″N 6°25′10″E
Saaxumhuizen	Winsum	53°22′55″N 6°29′05″E
Sappemeer	Hoogezand-Sappemeer	53°09′50″N 6°47′25″E
Sauwerd	Winsum	53°17′35″N 6°32′05″E
Schaapbulten	Eemsdelta	53°16′50″N 6°55′55″E
Schaaphok	Slochteren	53°14′10″N 6°44′25″E
Scharmer	Slochteren	53°12′15″N 6°42′20″E
Scheemda	Scheemda	53°10′25″N 6°58′20″E
Scheemdermeer	Scheemda	53°10′20″N 6°59′25″E
Scheemderzwaag	Scheemda	53°10′55″N 6°57′05″E
Schildwolde	Slochteren	53°14′00″N 6°48′50″E
Schilligeham	Winsum	53°19′30″N 6°29′10″E
Schouwen	De Marne	53°19′45″N 6°26′20″E
Schouwerzijl	De Marne	53°19′55″N 6°27′00″E
Sebaldeburen	Westerkwartier	53°13′15″N 6°18′35″E
Sellingen	Vlagtwedde	52°56′45″N 7°09′05″E
Sellingerbeetse	Vlagtwedde	52°55′55″N 7°04′55″E
Sellingerzwarteveen	Vlagtwedde	52°57′25″N 7°09′30″E
Selwerd	Westerkwartier	53°17′40″N 6°24′00″E
Selwerd	Groningen	53°14′50″N 6°33′05″E
Siddeburen	Slochteren	53°15′00″N 6°52′05″E
Sint Annen	Ten Boer	53°17′50″N 6°39′55″E
Sint Annerhuisjes	Bedum	53°18′05″N 6°37′20″E
Slaperstil	Groningen	53°14′35″N 6°29′45″E
Slegge	Vlagtwedde	52°54′40″N 7°04′35″E
Slochteren	Slochteren	53°13′00″N 6°48′05″E
Smeerling	Stadskanaal	53°01′35″N 7°04′45″E
Spijk	Eemsdelta	53°23′25″N 6°50′15″E
Spitsbergen	Menterwolde	53°10′35″N 6°50′00″E
Stadskanaal	Stadskanaal	52°59′20″N 6°57′45″E
Stakenborg	Vlagtwedde	53°01′05″N 7°10′35″E
Startenhuizen	Eemsdelta	53°22′10″N 6°42′35″E
Stedum	Eemsdelta	53°19′20″N 6°41′45″E
Steendam	Slochteren	53°16′25″N 6°50′35″E
Sterenborg	Stadskanaal	53°02′15″N 7°04′00″E
Stitswerd	Eemsmond	53°21′40″N 6°36′00″E
Stootshorn	Menterwolde	53°11′40″N 6°50′20″E
Stork	Eemsdelta	53°20′20″N 6°43′55″E
Suttum	Westerkwartier	53°17′10″N 6°26′15″E
Tange	Stadskanaal	53°02′25″N 7°01′30″E
Ten Boer	Ten Boer	53°16′35″N 6°41′40″E
Ten Post	Ten Boer	53°17′50″N 6°43′40″E
Ter Apel	Vlagtwedde	52°52′35″N 7°03′35″E
Ter Apelkanaal	Vlagtwedde	52°54′10″N 7°02′55″E
Ter Borg	Vlagtwedde	52°56′20″N 7°07′50″E
Ter Haar	Vlagtwedde	52°53′50″N 7°05′35″E
Ter Laan	Bedum	53°18′40″N 6°37′20″E
Ter Maarsch	Stadskanaal	53°00′25″N 6°59′55″E
Termunten	Eemsdelta	53°17′50″N 7°02′45″E
Termunterzijl	Eemsdelta	53°18′00″N 7°02′10″E
Ter Wisch	Vlagtwedde	52°54′55″N 7°06′00″E
Ter Wupping	Stadskanaal	53°02′20″N 7°04′45″E
Thesinge	Ten Boer	53°16′05″N 6°39′05″E
Tinallinge	Winsum	53°21′25″N 6°32′00″E
Tjamsweer	Eemsdelta	53°19′25″N 6°49′50″E
Tjuchem	Slochteren	53°16′50″N 6°52′40″E
't Kret	Westerkwartier	53°12′15″N 6°21′20″E
't Lage van den Weg	Eemsmond	53°24′35″N 6°39′20″E
Tolbert	Westerkwartier	53°10′35″N 6°22′20″E
Toornwerd	Eemsdelta	53°21′15″N 6°38′10″E
Topweer	Westerkwartier	53°10′10″N 6°11′30″E
Tranendal	Scheemda	53°08′50″N 7°00′10″E
Tripscompagnie	Menterwolde	53°08′15″N 6°49′30″E
't Stort	De Marne	53°21′10″N 6°23′30″E
Tusschenloegen	Menterwolde	53°09′15″N 6°51′45″E
Tussenklappen	Menterwolde	53°08′45″N 6°51′55″E
't Veen	Menterwolde	53°10′45″N 6°51′20″E
Tweehuizen	Eemsdelta	53°24′25″N 6°51′00″E
't Zandt	Eemsdelta	53°22′00″N 6°46′40″E
Uiteinde	Eemsdelta	53°22′10″N 6°52′40″E
Uiterburen	Menterwolde	53°10′35″N 6°52′25″E
Uithuizen	Eemsmond	53°24′25″N 6°40′15″E
Uithuizermeeden	Eemsmond	53°24′50″N 6°43′25″E
Uitwierde	Eemsdelta	53°20′30″N 6°53′45″E
Ulrum	De Marne	53°21′35″N 6°20′00″E
Ulsda	Reiderland	53°09′35″N 7°08′10″E
Usquert	Eemsmond	53°24′10″N 6°36′40″E
Veele	Vlagtwedde	53°02′20″N 7°05′55″E
Veelerveen	Bellingwedde	53°03′20″N 7°07′40″E
Veendam	Veendam	53°06′25″N 6°52′45″E
Veenhuizen	Menterwolde	53°11′10″N 6°49′40″E
Veenhuizen	Stadskanaal	53°01′05″N 7°00′50″E
Veldstreek	Westerkwartier	53°06′45″N 6°19′40″E
Vierburen	Eemsdelta	53°21′10″N 6°42′00″E
Vierhuizen	De Marne	53°21′40″N 6°17′30″E
Vierhuizen	Eemsdelta	53°24′20″N 6°51′35″E
Vierverlaten	Groningen	53°12′45″N 6°28′55″E
Visvliet	Westerkwartier	53°15′55″N 6°14′55″E
Vlagtwedde	Vlagtwedde	53°01′40″N 7°06′30″E
Vlagtwedder-Veldhuis	Vlagtwedde	53°00′40″N 7°08′00″E
Vledderhuizen	Stadskanaal	53°00′25″N 7°02′15″E
Vledderveen	Stadskanaal	52°59′15″N 7°00′25″E
Vosseberg	Stadskanaal	52°59′30″N 7°02′50″E
Vriescheloo	Bellingwedde	53°04′05″N 7°06′50″E
Wadwerd	Eemsmond	53°24′05″N 6°35′25″E
Wagenborgen	Eemsdelta	53°15′20″N 6°56′00″E
Warffum	Eemsmond	53°23′30″N 6°33′30″E
Warfhuizen	De Marne	53°20′25″N 6°25′30″E
Waterhuizen	Hoogezand-Sappemeer	53°11′10″N 6°39′05″E
Wedde	Bellingwedde	53°04′10″N 7°04′45″E
Wedderheide	Bellingwedde	53°04′05″N 7°06′10″E
Weende	Vlagtwedde	53°00′05″N 7°07′45″E
Wehe-Den Hoorn	De Marne	53°21′30″N 6°25′20″E
Weite	Vlagtwedde	53°01′25″N 7°08′15″E
Weiwerd	Eemsdelta	53°18′40″N 6°56′50″E
Wessinghuizen	Stadskanaal	53°03′10″N 7°04′30″E
Wessingtange	Vlagtwedde	52°55′05″N 7°08′40″E
Westeind	Bellingwedde	53°06′40″N 7°02′15″E
Westeind	Menterwolde	53°09′50″N 6°49′20″E
Westerbroek	Hoogezand-Sappemeer	53°11′05″N 6°41′15″E
Westerdijkshorn	Bedum	53°18′35″N 6°34′30″E
Westeremden	Eemsdelta	53°20′40″N 6°42′40″E
Westeremder Voorwerk	Eemsdelta	53°21′35″N 6°43′00″E
Westerhorn	Eemsmond	53°23′35″N 6°35′50″E
Westerklooster	De Marne	53°23′15″N 6°23′00″E
Westerlee	Scheemda	53°08′45″N 6°59′15″E
Westernieland	De Marne	53°24′05″N 6°29′00″E
Westerwijtwerd	Eemsdelta	53°20′00″N 6°38′35″E
Westerzand	Westerkwartier	53°14′10″N 6°18′30″E
Wierhuizen	De Marne	53°24′10″N 6°25′45″E
Wierum	Winsum	53°16′05″N 6°30′40″E
Wierumerschouw	Westerkwartier	53°16′10″N 6°30′10″E
Wildeplaats	Pekela	53°01′45″N 6°56′05″E
Wilderhof	Slochteren	53°16′20″N 6°54′15″E
Wildervank	Veendam	53°04′50″N 6°51′45″E
Wildervanksterdallen	Veendam	53°03′15″N 6°53′00″E
Willemstad	Westerkwartier	53°08′05″N 6°17′20″E
Winneweer	Ten Boer	53°18′35″N 6°44′45″E
Winschoten	Winschoten	53°08′40″N 7°02′05″E
Winschoterhoogebrug	Winschoten	53°07′50″N 7°02′55″E
Winsum	Winsum	53°19′45″N 6°31′15″E
Wirdum	Eemsdelta	53°19′20″N 6°47′05″E
Wirdumerdraai	Eemsdelta	53°18′50″N 6°47′20″E
Wittewierum	Ten Boer	53°17′15″N 6°44′50″E
Woldendorp	Eemsdelta	53°16′25″N 7°01′50″E
Wolfsbarge	Hoogezand-Sappemeer	53°07′30″N 6°43′15″E
Wollingboermarke	Vlagtwedde	53°00′10″N 7°10′15″E
Wollinghuizen	Vlagtwedde	52°59′40″N 7°08′55″E
Woltersum	Ten Boer	53°16′15″N 6°43′55″E
Woudbloem	Slochteren	53°13′00″N 6°44′15″E
Zandberg	Vlagtwedde	52°55′05″N 7°02′30″E
Zandeweer	Eemsmond	53°23′15″N 6°41′00″E
Zandstroom	Bellingwedde	53°05′45″N 7°04′35″E
Zeerijp	Eemsdelta	53°20′55″N 6°45′40″E
Zethuis	Westerkwartier	53°09′20″N 6°14′20″E
Zevenhuizen	Eemsmond	53°23′05″N 6°41′30″E
Zevenhuizen	Ten Boer	53°15′15″N 6°40′05″E
Zevenhuizen	Westerkwartier	53°07′35″N 6°20′50″E
Zijldijk	Eemsdelta	53°23′40″N 6°45′25″E
Zomerdijk	Eemsdelta	53°16′20″N 6°58′05″E
Zoutkamp	De Marne	53°20′20″N 6°18′15″E
Zuidbroek	Menterwolde	53°09′50″N 6°51′40″E
Zuidhorn	Westerkwartier	53°14′45″N 6°24′10″E
Zuidveld	Vlagtwedde	52°55′45″N 7°09′05″E
Zuidwending	Veendam	53°05′45″N 6°56′05″E
Zuidwolde	Bedum	53°15′45″N 6°35′30″E
Zuurdijk	De Marne	53°20′20″N 6°22′35″E
