= Breede =

Breede may refer to:

- Breede, Netherlands, a town in the Eemsmond municipality
- Breede Water Management Area in South Africa
- Breede River in South Africa
