= Eemsmond =

- Former municipality
- Flag Coat of arms

- Location in Groningen
- Coordinates: 53°24′N 6°40′E
- Country: Netherlands
- Province: Groningen
- Established: 1 January 1979

Area
  - Total: 543.35 km^{2} (209.79 sq mi)
  - Land: 189.81 km^{2} (73.29 sq mi)
  - Water: 353.54 km^{2} (136.50 sq mi)
- Elevation: 2 m (6.6 ft)

Population (January 2021)
  - Total: data missing
- Postcode: 9979–9989, 9995–9999
- Area code: 0595, 0596
- Website: www.eemsmond.nl

Eemsmond (Dutch pronunciation: [ˈeːmsmɔnt]; English: Ems Mouth) is a former municipality with a population of 15,864 in the north of the province of Groningen in the northeast of the Netherlands. On 1 January 2019 it merged with the municipalities of Bedum, De Marne and Winsum to form the new municipality Het Hogeland.

== History ==
The municipality of Hefshuizen was established on 1 January 1979 by merging the municipalities of Uithuizen and Uithuizermeeden. On 1 January 1990, the municipalities of Kantens, Usquert, and Warffum were added. On 1 January 1992, the name of the municipality was changed from Hefshuizen to Eemsmond, which means Ems Mouth.

== Geography ==
Dutch topographic map of the municipality of Eemsmond, June 2015

Eemsmond is located at 53°24′N 6°40′E in the north of the province of Groningen and in the northeast of the Netherlands.

The population centers in the municipality are: Eemshaven, Eppenhuizen, Kantens, Oldenzijl, Oosteinde, Oosternieland, Oudeschip, Roodeschool, Rottum, Startenhuizen, Stitswerd, Uithuizen, Uithuizermeeden, Usquert, Warffum, and Zandeweer.

To the north of Eemsmond is the North Sea. Part of the Wadden Sea, a UNESCO World Heritage Site since 2009, is located in the municipality, including the sandbank Simonszand and the uninhabited islands Rottumeroog, Rottumerplaat, and Zuiderduintjes. The northernmost point of the Netherlands is located at Rottumerplaat.

== Culture ==
Eemsmond hosted the start of stage 4 at the 2013 Energiewacht Tour.

== Government ==
Marijke van Beek of the Labour Party (PvdA) was the last mayor of Eemsmond.

== Transportation ==
The Sauwerd–Roodeschool railway connects the railway stations Warffum, Usquert, Uithuizen, Uithuizermeeden, and Roodeschool to the Groningen railway station and the rest of the Dutch railway network.

== Notable people ==
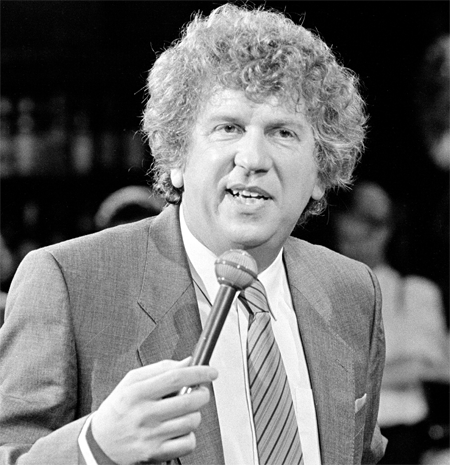
Seth Gaaikema, 1985

- Willem Surenhuis (c.1664 in Rottum – 1729) a Dutch Christian scholar of Hebrew
- Hendrik Bulthuis (1865 in Warffum – 1945) a Dutch customs official, author and translator of more than thirty works into Esperanto
- Frits Peutz (1896 in Uithuizen – 1974) architect
- Aldert van der Ziel (1910 in Zandeweer – 1991) a Dutch physicist who studied electronic noise processes
- Molly Geertsema (1918–1991) politician and jurist, Mayor of Warffum 1953-1957
- Seth Gaaikema (1939 in Uithuizen – 2014) cabaret artist, writer, and lyricist
- Ede Staal (1941 in Warffum – 1986) a Dutch singer-songwriter, sang mainly in Gronings dialect
