= Doodstil =

- Hamlet
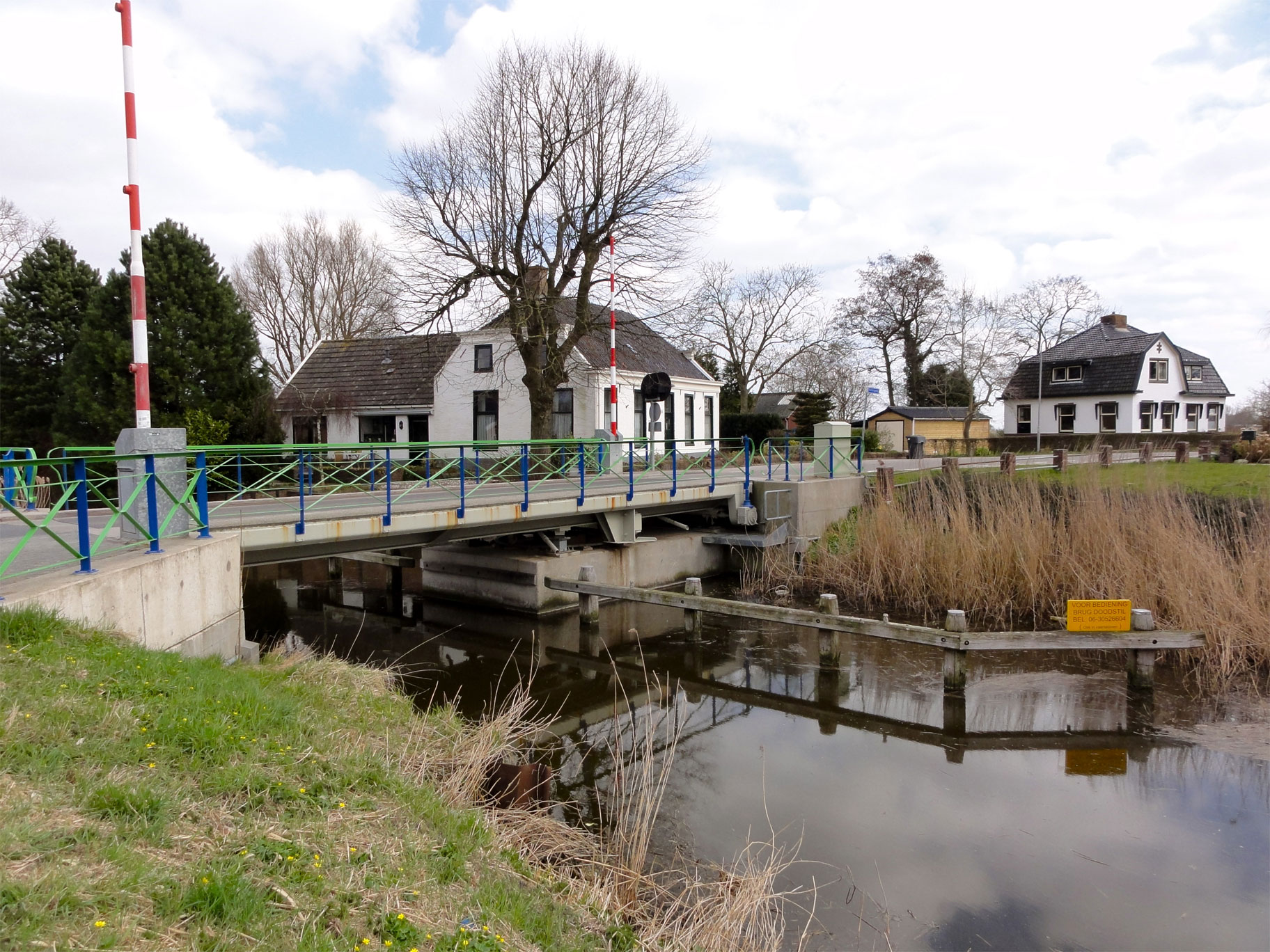
- The doodstil in Doodstil

- Location in province of Groningen in the Netherlands Doodstil (Netherlands)
- Coordinates: 53.39062°N 6.67326°E
- Country: Netherlands
- Province: Groningen
- Municipality: Het Hogeland

Area
  - Total: 0.21 km^{2} (0.081 sq mi)
- Elevation: 1 m (3.3 ft)

Population (2021)
  - Total: 70
  - Density: 330/km^{2} (860/sq mi)
- Time zone: UTC+1 (CET)
  - Summer (DST): UTC+2 (CEST)
- Postal code: 9997
- Dialing code: 0595

Doodstil is a hamlet in the Dutch province of Groningen. It is a part of the municipality of Het Hogeland. The hamlet is known for its name which seemingly translates to "dead silent". Doodstil is located along the Boterdiep. In 2005, it won the election for beautiful place name of the Netherlands.

== Etymology ==
Doodstil seemingly reads as dood-stil (dead silent), however it should be read as doods-til, the bridge (til) of Doode. Doode probably referred to Doede who was collecting toll on the bridge on behalf of Menkemaborg. There are of course multiple alternative explanations and legends connected to Doodstil.

== History ==
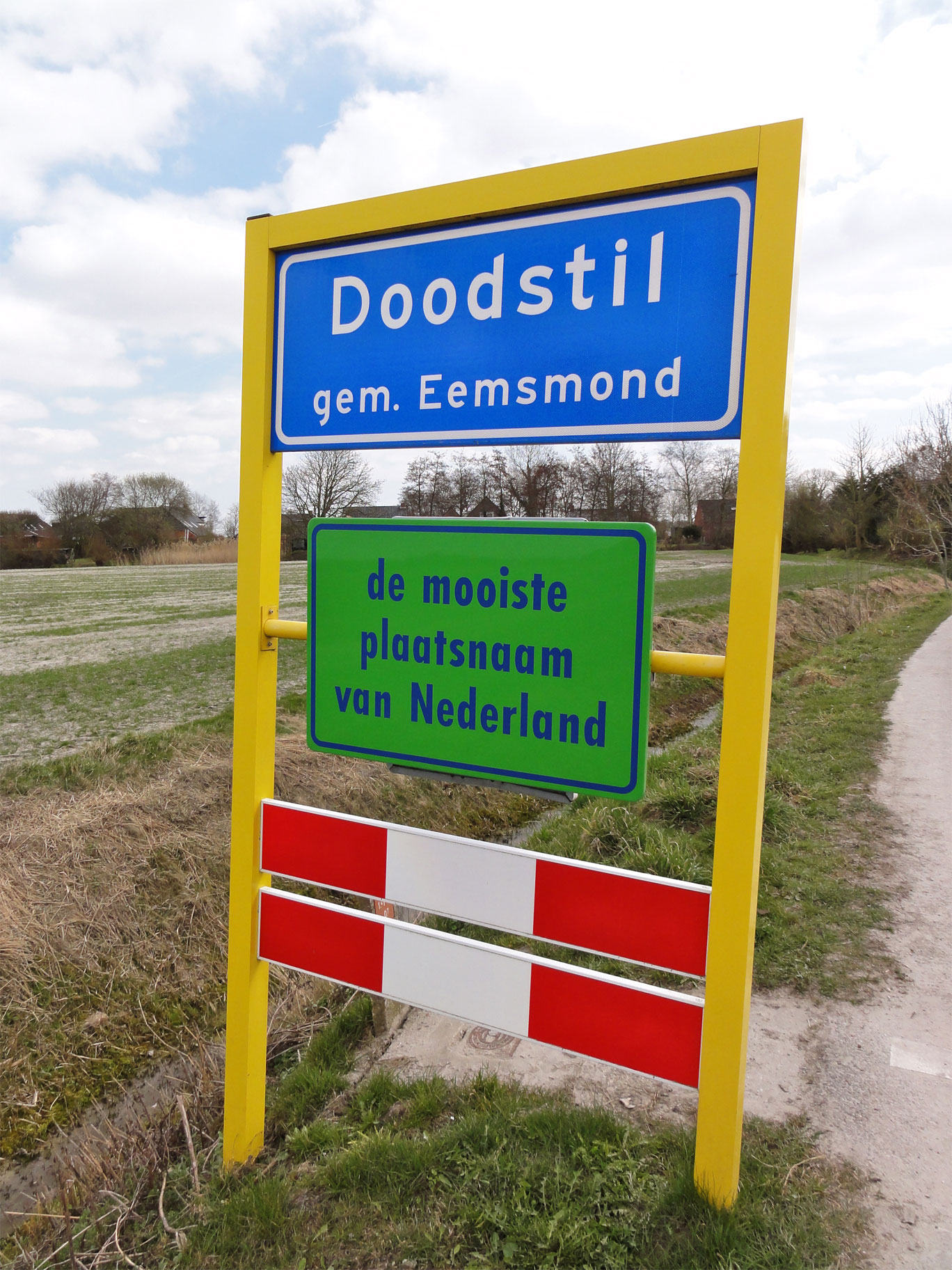
Place name sign

The village was first mentioned as Doetijl in 1456. In 1845, it was first mentioned as Doodstil. It used to be a lively hamlet with groceries, bars, and bakeries, and there used to be a little harbour on the Boterdiep. During the liberation of the Netherlands, gunfire was heard in Doodstil and five Germans ran through the village and threw their riffles in the canal. Moments later, Canadian soldiers appeared who were chasing the Germans. A tank arrived later offering cigarettes and chocolate, but quickly moved on.

During the 20th century, retail disappeared, however it was still located on a main road. In 1979, the N46 opened, and the village became quieter. In 1989, it became real quiet when the bridge was restored and the road closed for ongoing traffic.

In 2005, Doodstil participated in an internet competition for most beautiful place name of the Netherlands, and received 49% of the votes. The new-found fame resulted in the end of the quietness of the hamlet. It was even visited by tour busses and the place name sign was stolen many times as a souvenir. In 2019, RTV Noord organised a most beautiful place name in Groningen competition. Doodstil wanted to participate, but was disqualified by the organisation, because it had already won the 2005 competition.

The postal authority does not recognise Doodstil as a separate entity and has put it under Zandeweer. The hamlet is recognised as a statistical entity. It used to be part of the municipality of Kantens. In 1990, it was merged into Eemsmond and in 2019 in Het Hogeland.

== Mayor's house ==
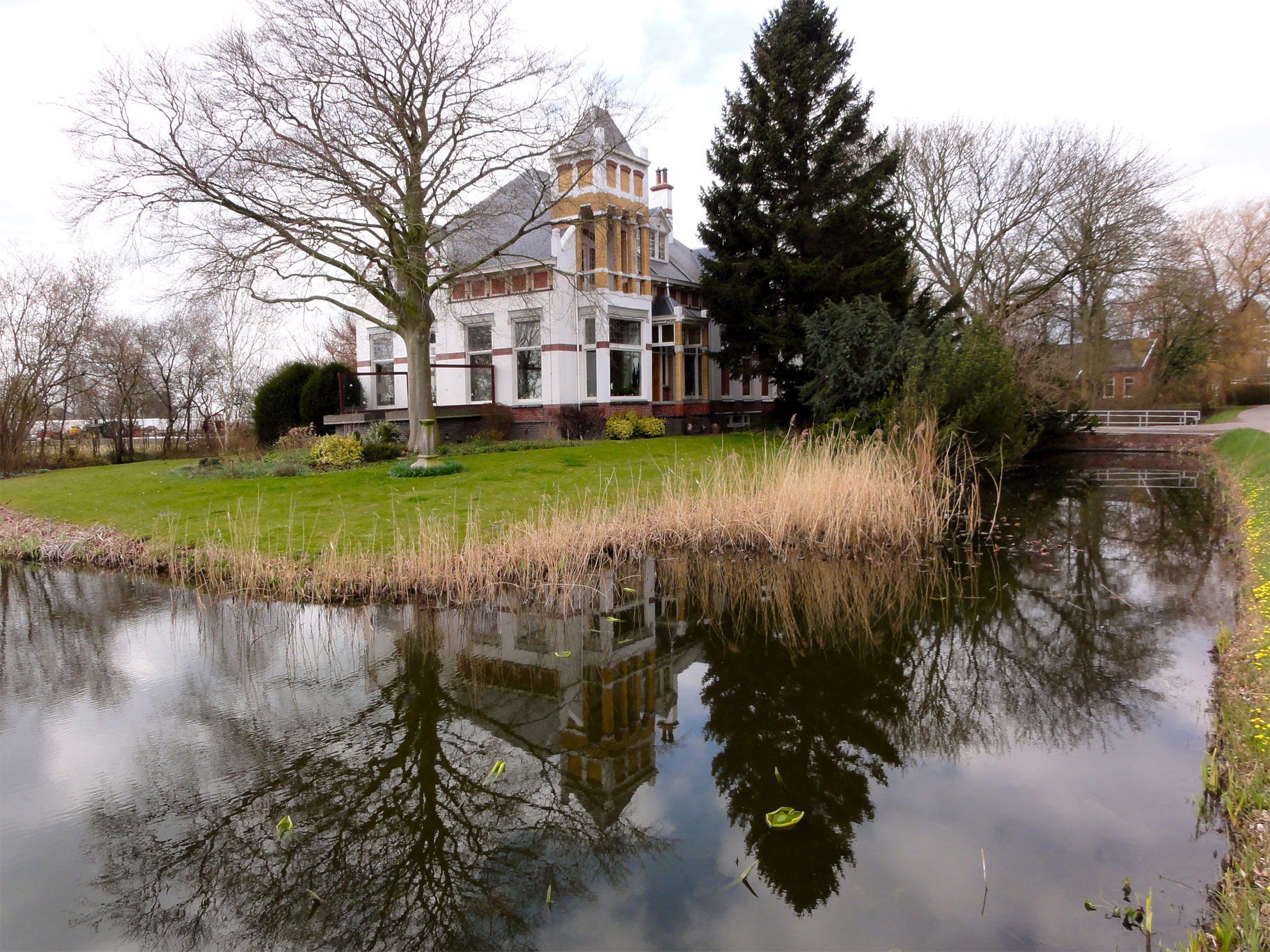
Mayor's house

The Mayor's house is a villa built in 1916 for Harm Smedema, the mayor of Kantens to which Doodstil belonged. The villa is a combination of Art Nouveau and Swiss chalet style, and has an attached carriage house. Even though it is popularly known as mayor's house, it only served as a residence. In 2001, it was declared a monument.

== Notable people ==
- Okke Geerts Kluin (1813–1838), murderer who killed his landlady and was the last person in Groningen to be sentenced to death.
