= Oling, Netherlands =

Oling
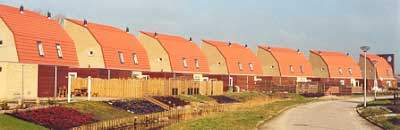
- A street in Oling

- Location of Oling in the province of Groningen
- Coordinates: 53°19′0″N 6°50′0″E
- Country: Netherlands
- Province: Groningen
- Municipality: Eemsdelta

Population (2020)
  - Total: < 25

Oling is a hamlet in the province of Groningen, in the Netherlands.

Oling used to be located in the (former) municipality of Appingedam, but has been a part of the new municipality of Eemsdelta after a municipal reclassification in 2021.

Oling is very scarcely populated, presumably less than 25 people are living in this tiny settlement west of Appingedam.

== Geography ==
Olings' elevation is −4 metres (−13 ft) below sea level.

Distance

Within less than two kilometers of Oling are Garreweer (1.1 km), Tjamsweer (1.1 km), and Appingedam (1.9 km), all in the province of Groningen. The city of Groningen approximately lies 21 kilometres (13 mi) from Oling.

== See also ==
- List of cities, towns and villages in Groningen
