= Noordpolderzijl =

- Hamlet
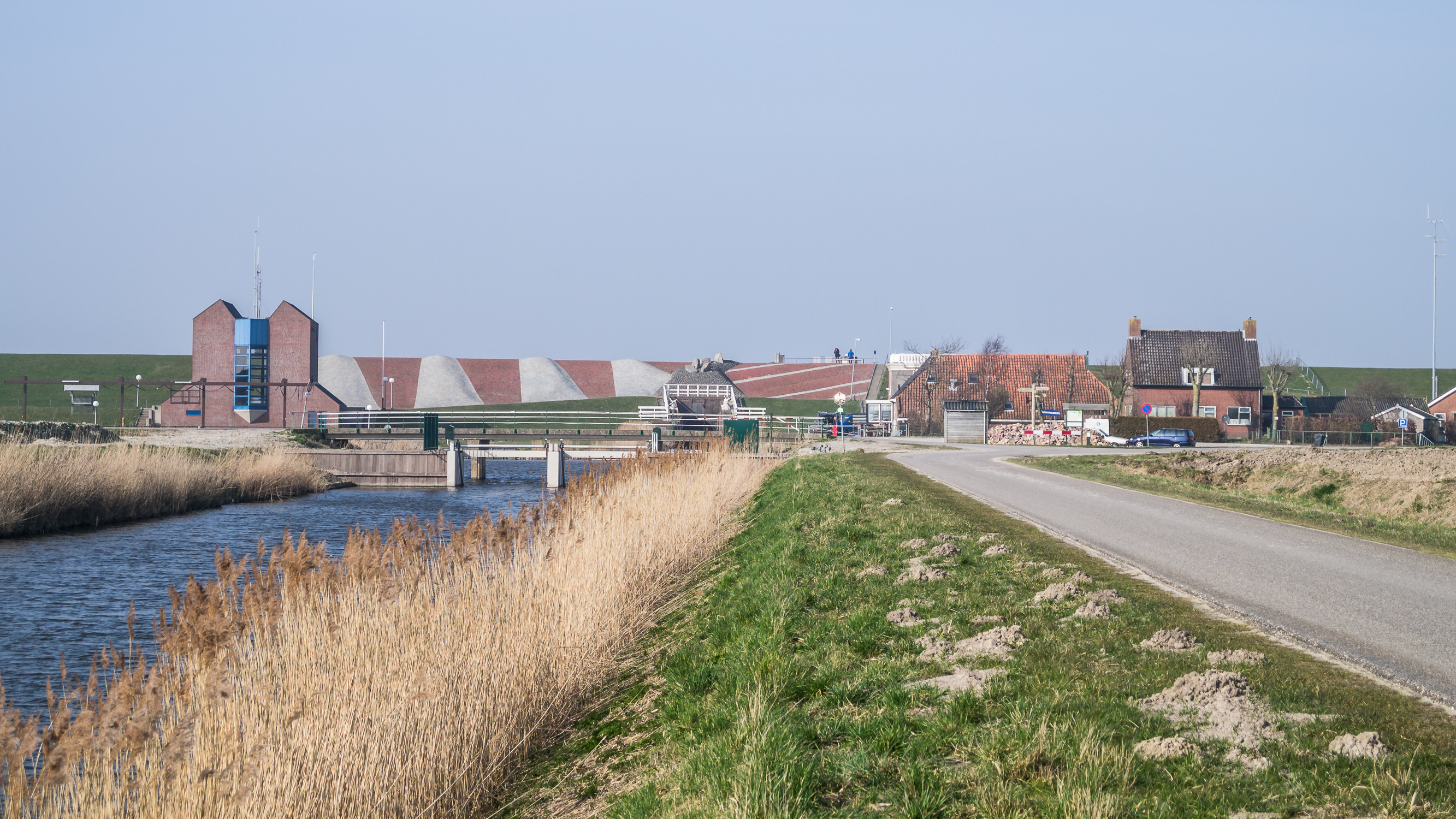
- Noordpolderzijl in 2014

- Location of Noordpolderzijl in Groningen in the Netherlands
- Coordinates: 53°25′56″N 6°34′59″E
- Country: Netherlands
- Province: Groningen
- Municipality: Het Hogeland

Noordpolderzijl is a hamlet in the Dutch province of Groningen. It is located in the municipality of Het Hogeland, about 4 km northwest of Usquert.

Noordpolderzijl is named after the zijl (sluice) in the dyke of the Noordpolder. The original sluice was built in 1811, when the Noordpolder was made dry. The hamlet is located on the land side of the sluice. At the other side of the dyke is the harbour of Noordpolderzijl, which is the smallest seaport in the Netherlands. It usually houses two fishing boats.
