= Denemarken =

- Hamlet
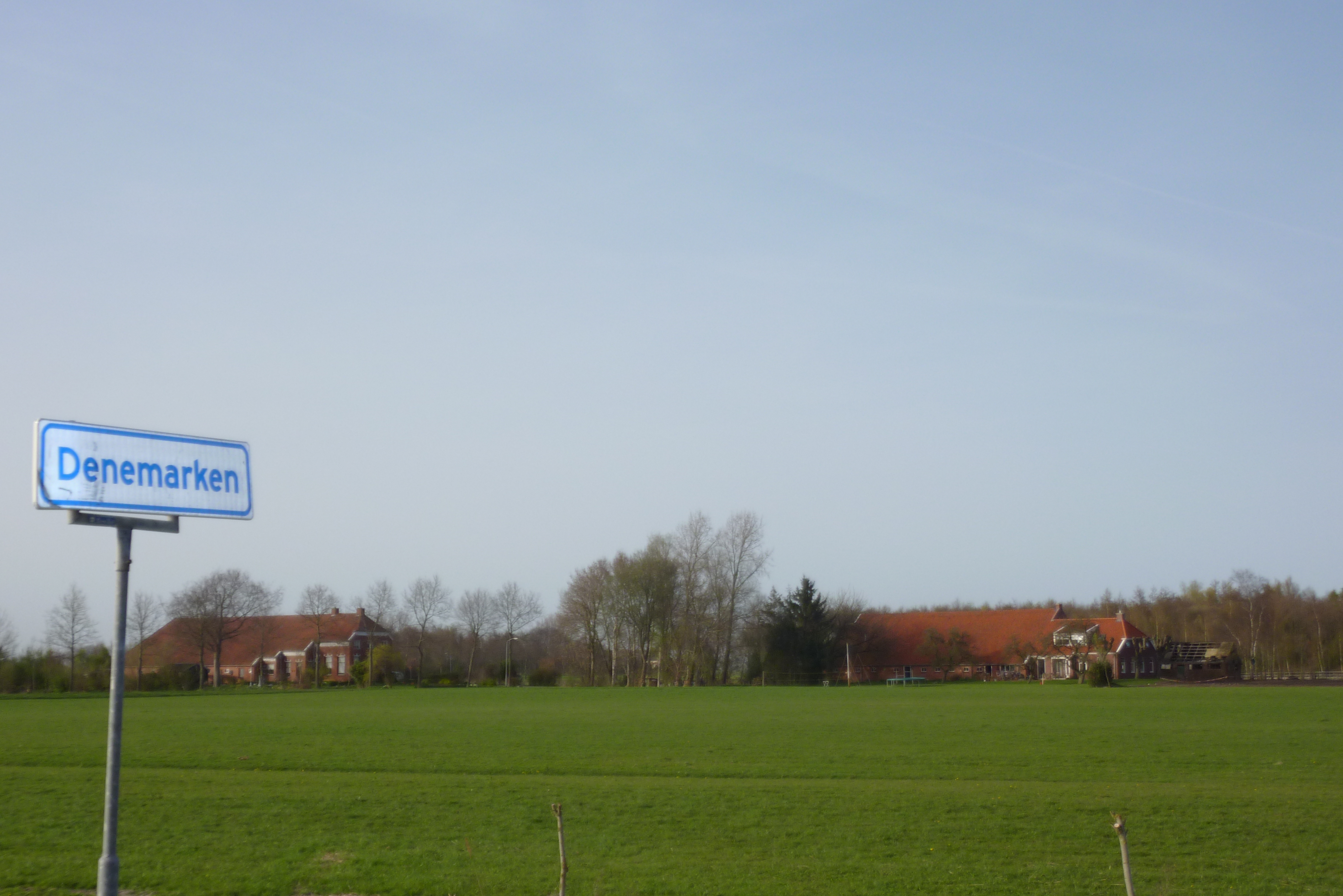
- Denemarken in 2011

- Location of Denemarken in the province of Groningen Denemarken (Netherlands)
- Coordinates: 53°13′45″N 6°47′2″E
- Country: Netherlands
- Province: Groningen
- Municipality: Midden-Groningen

Denemarken is a hamlet in the municipality of Midden-Groningen, in the Dutch province of Groningen. It consists of some ten dwellings, mostly farms. The name does not reference the Scandinavian country but means wild lands in the local dialect. It is notable for laying on top of the Groningen gas field, the largest natural gas field in Europe. In 2015 the nature reserve 't Roegwold (wild swamp forest) was opened, overlapping partly with Denemarken. The award-winning semi-autobiographical novel Kinderen van het Ruige Land (Children of the Savage Land, 2012) by Auke Hulst is situated in the hamlet.
