= Kruisweg =

- Hamlet
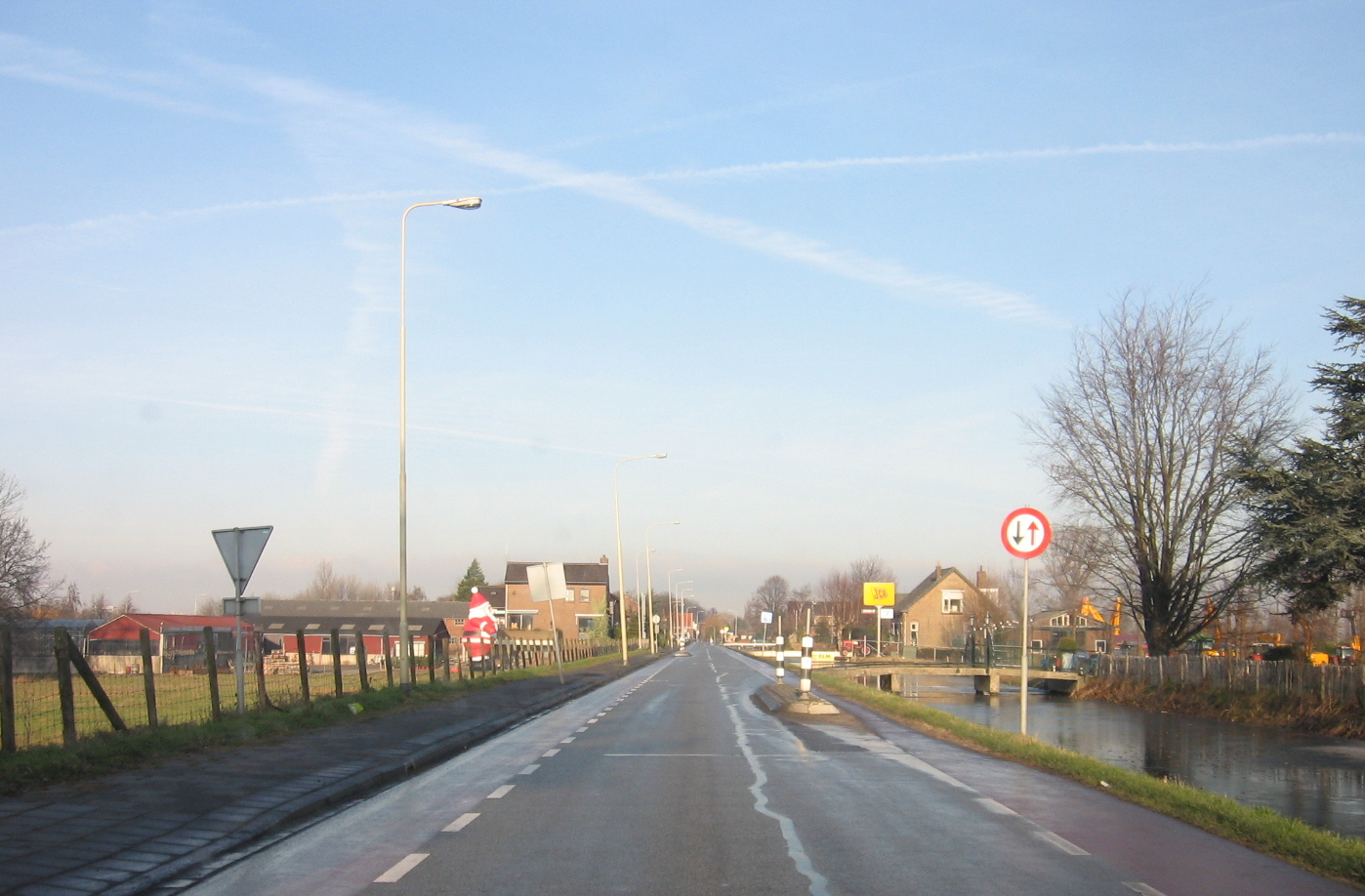
- View over Kruisweg

- Location within the Netherlands
- Country: Netherlands
- Province: South Holland
- Municipality: Lansingerland

Population (January 2020)
  - Total: 190
- Time zone: UTC+1 (CET)
  - Summer (DST): UTC+2 (CEST)
- Postal code: 2665
- Area code: 079

Kruisweg is a hamlet in the municipality of Lansingerland, in the province of South Holland, Netherlands. It used to be part of the former municipality of Bleiswijk and is located close to Moerkapelle.

The hamlet consists of a string of houses including a restaurant alongside the Kruisweg road and is located adjacent to a large industrial area.

== Demographics ==
According to the January 2020 census, its population was 190.
