= Dorkwerd =

- Village
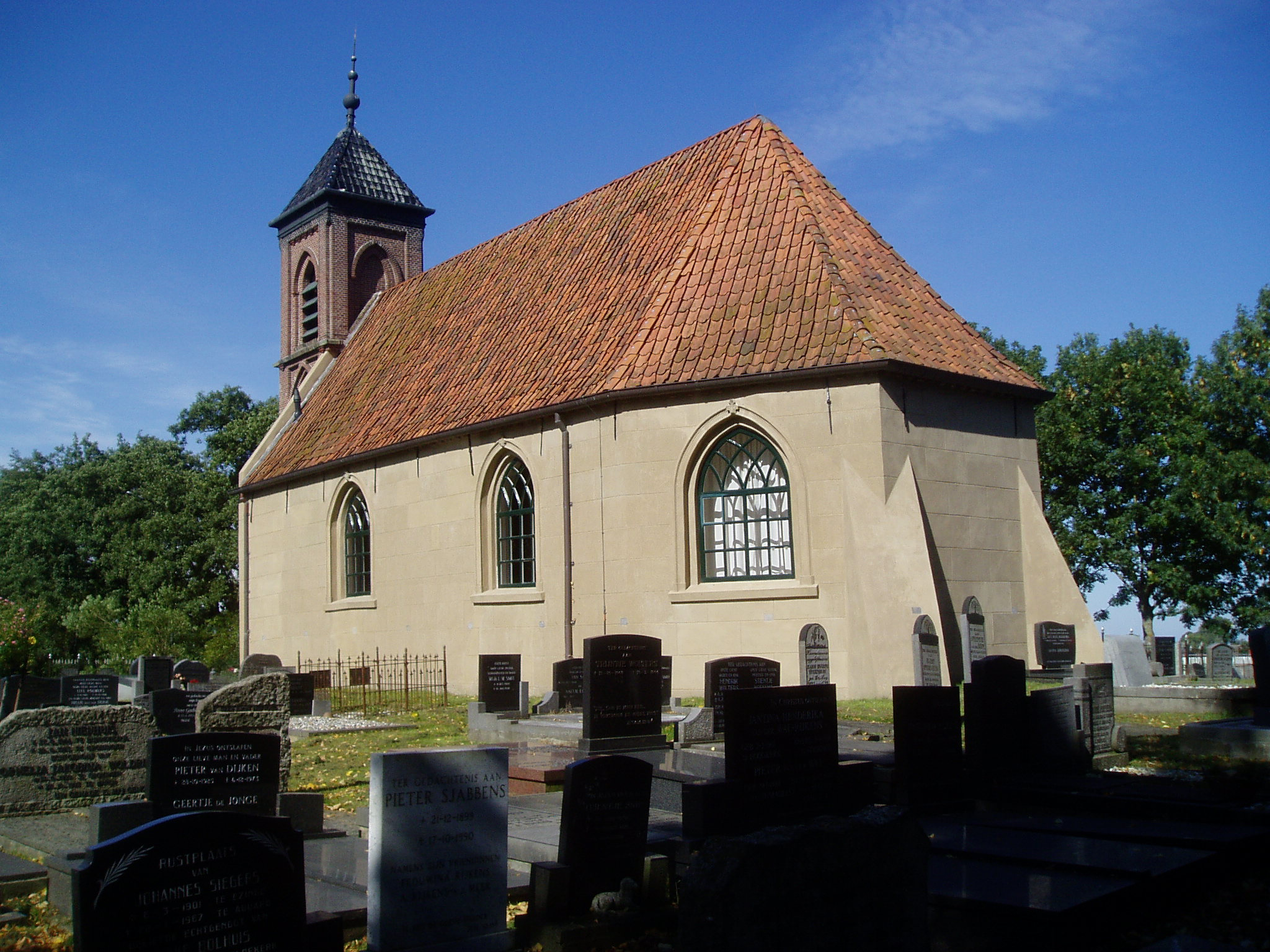
- Protestant Church

- Location in the province of Groningen in the Netherlands Dorkwerd (Netherlands)
- Coordinates: 53°15′2″N 6°30′45″E
- Country: Netherlands
- Province: Groningen
- Municipality: Groningen

Area
  - Total: 2.03 km^{2} (0.78 sq mi)
- Elevation: 0.5 m (1.6 ft)

Population (2021)
  - Total: 75
  - Density: 37/km^{2} (96/sq mi)
- Time zone: UTC+1 (CET)
  - Summer (DST): UTC+2 (CEST)
- Postal code: 9746
- Dialing code: 050

Dorkwerd is a small village in Groningen, the Netherlands. It is located in the municipality of Groningen, about 4 km northwest of the city center. Recent construction of new residential areas have brought the city to less than 500 meters from the village of Dorkwerd, and the postal authorities have placed it under Groningen.

According to the 19th-century historian A.J. van der Aa, Dorkwerd (also written Dorkwert or Dorquert) consisted of 19 houses, with a population of almost 140. Most of the village was in the municipality of Hoogkerk, west of the Reitdiep canal, but two houses belonging to the village were east of the canal in Adorp. There was a small village school here, built in 1832.

== History ==
The village was first mentioned in 1335 as Dorquerth, and means terp probably in combination with dregs (sediment settled in the water). Dorkwerd was built on a terp (artificial living hill). The church is in the centre. It was built in 1648 as a replacement of a church which could have been from around 1200. In 1869, a tower was added.

Dorkwerk was home to 111 people in 1840. Most of the terp around the church has been excavated around 1911. The excavation caused the church to subside, and in 2009, the foundation of the church was strengthened.

== Gallery ==
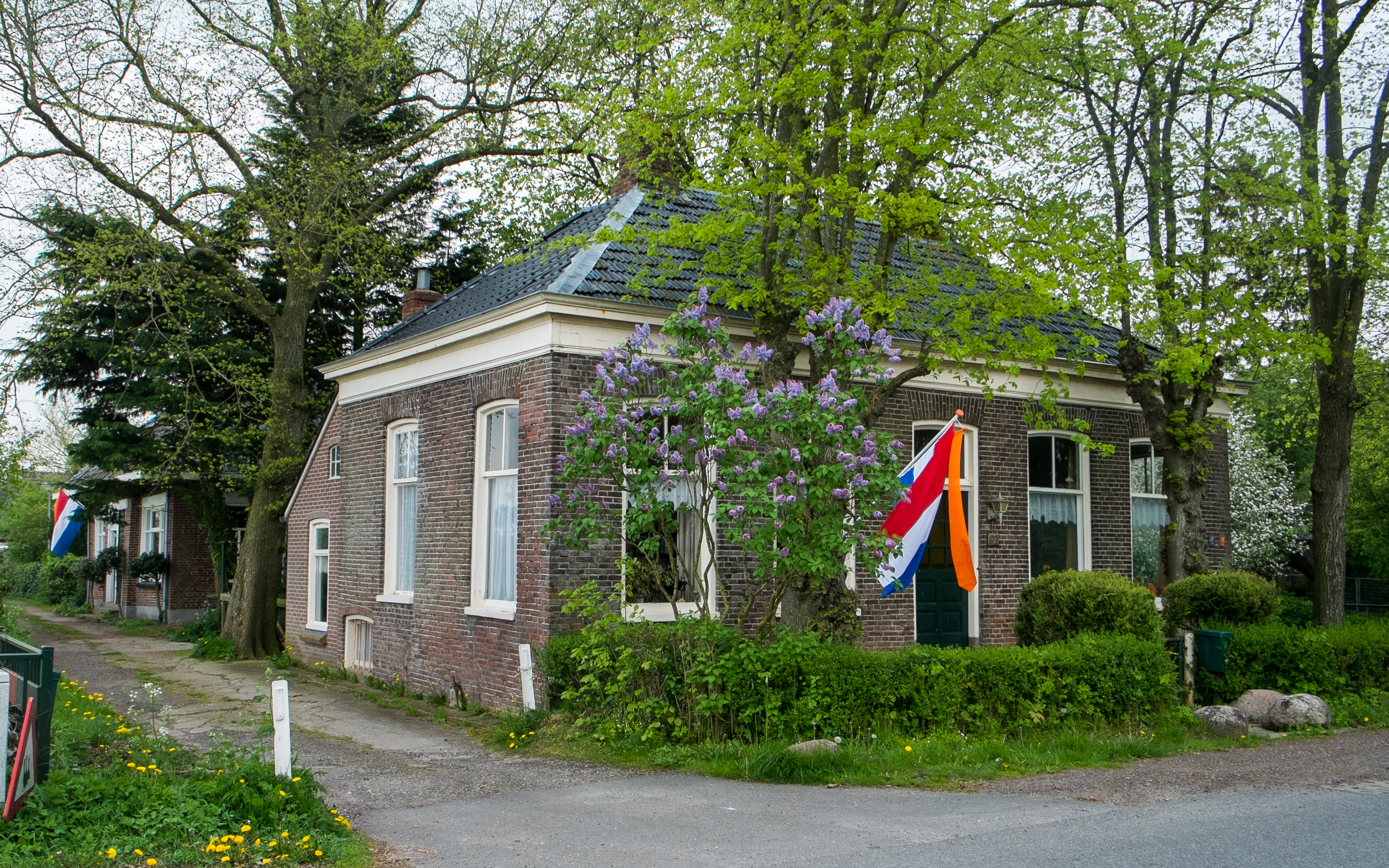
Former school master's house

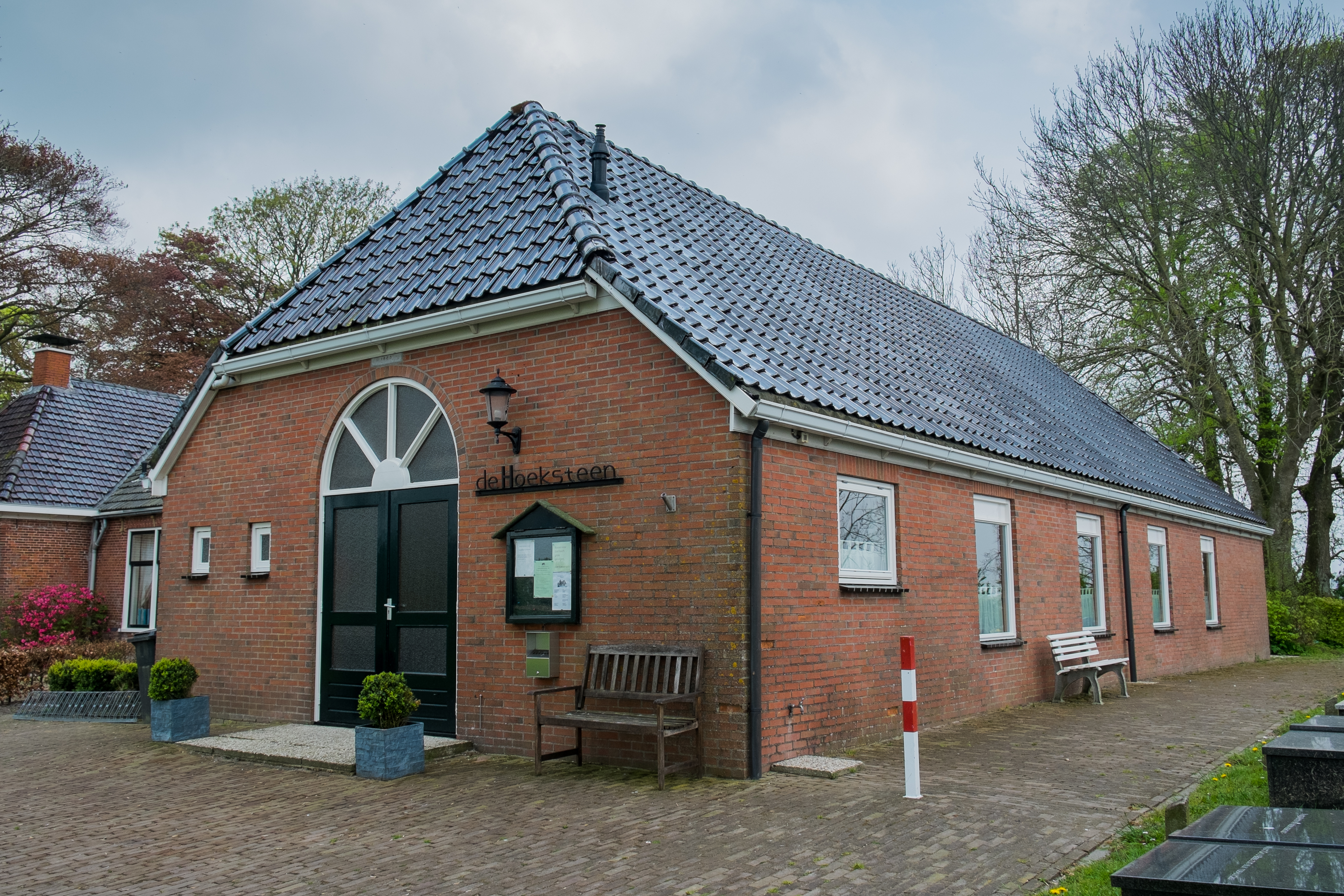
Village house

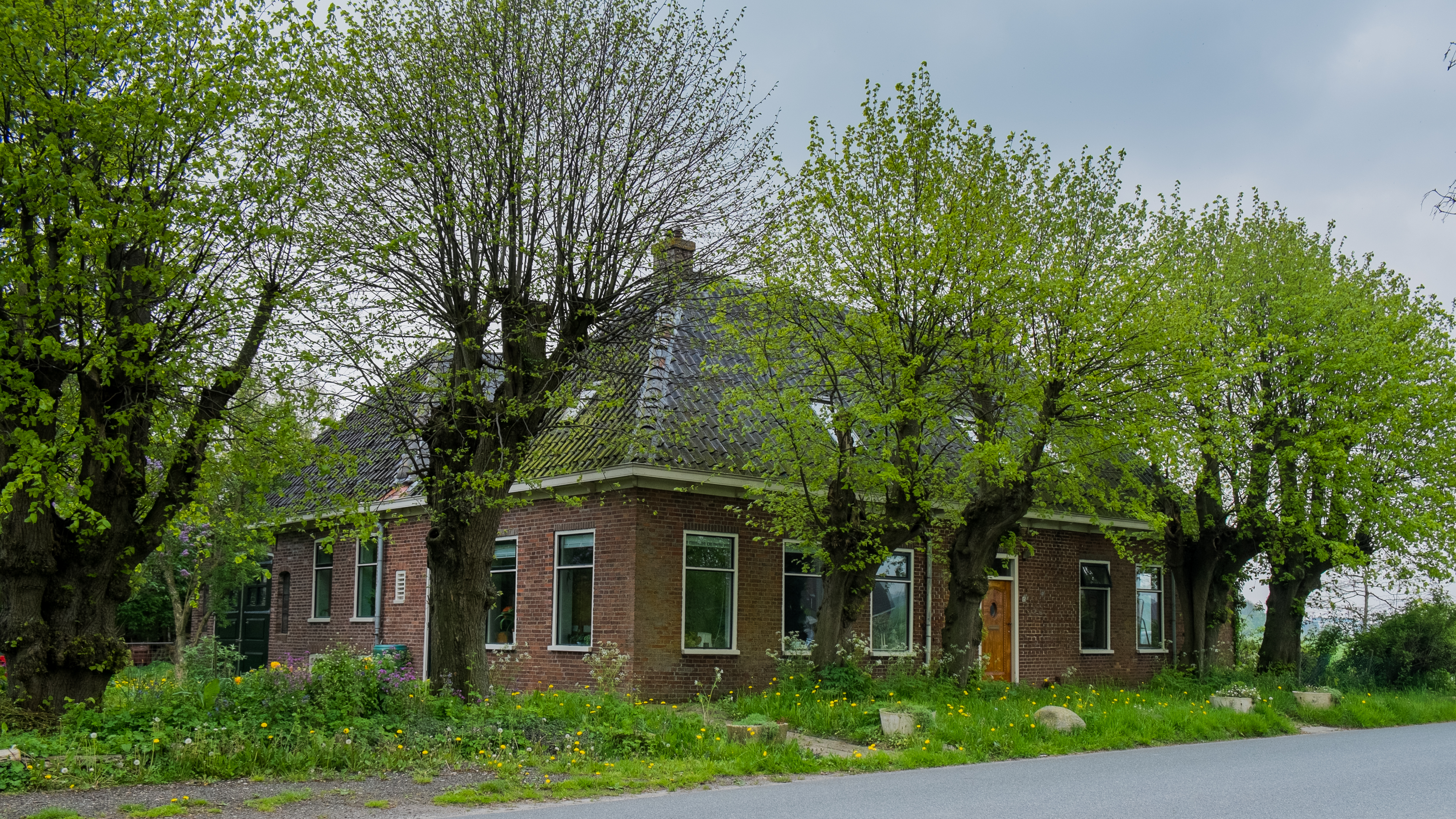
Pub Onder de Linden

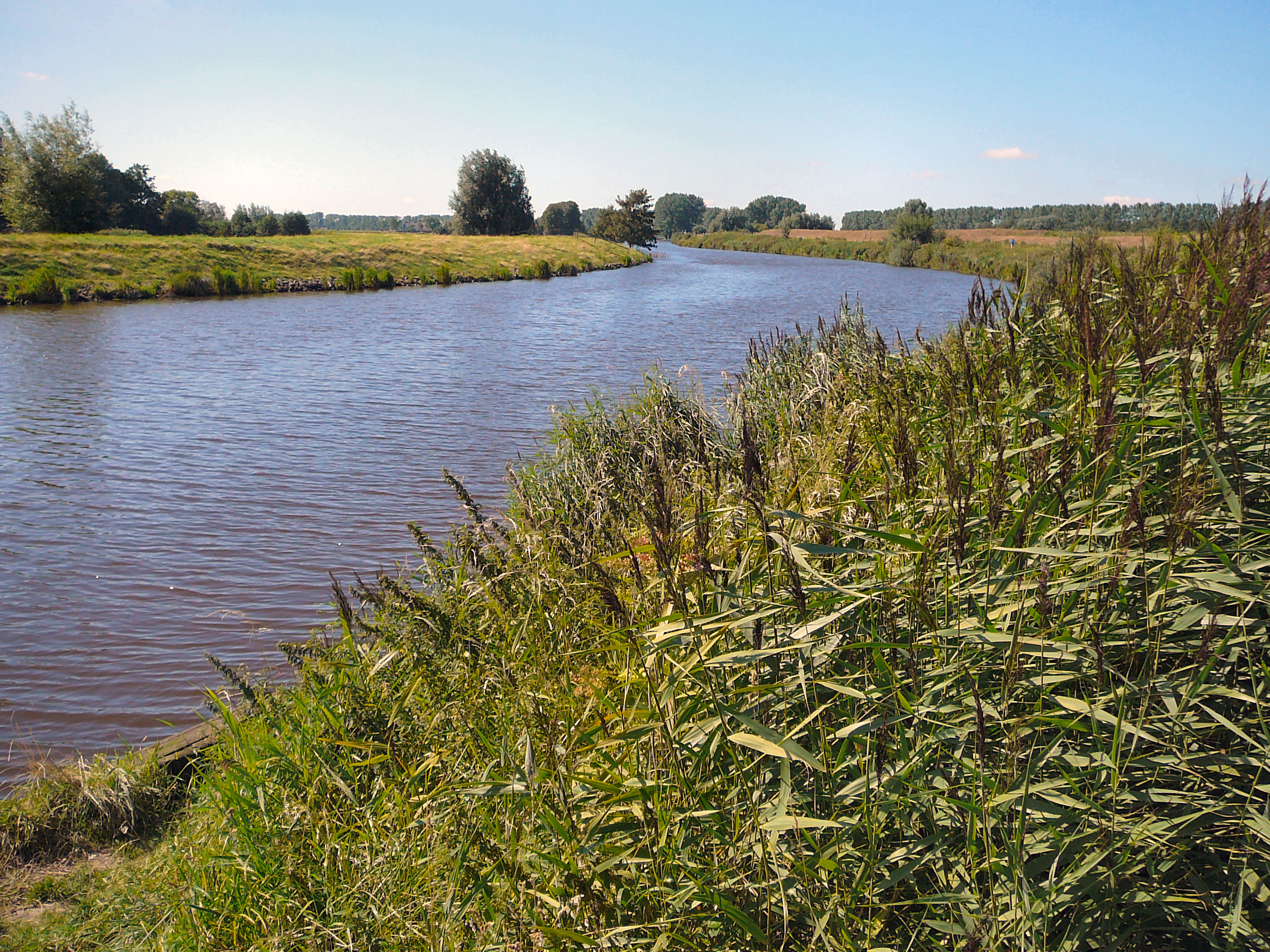
Rietdiep near Dorkwerd
