= De Maten =

- Hamlet
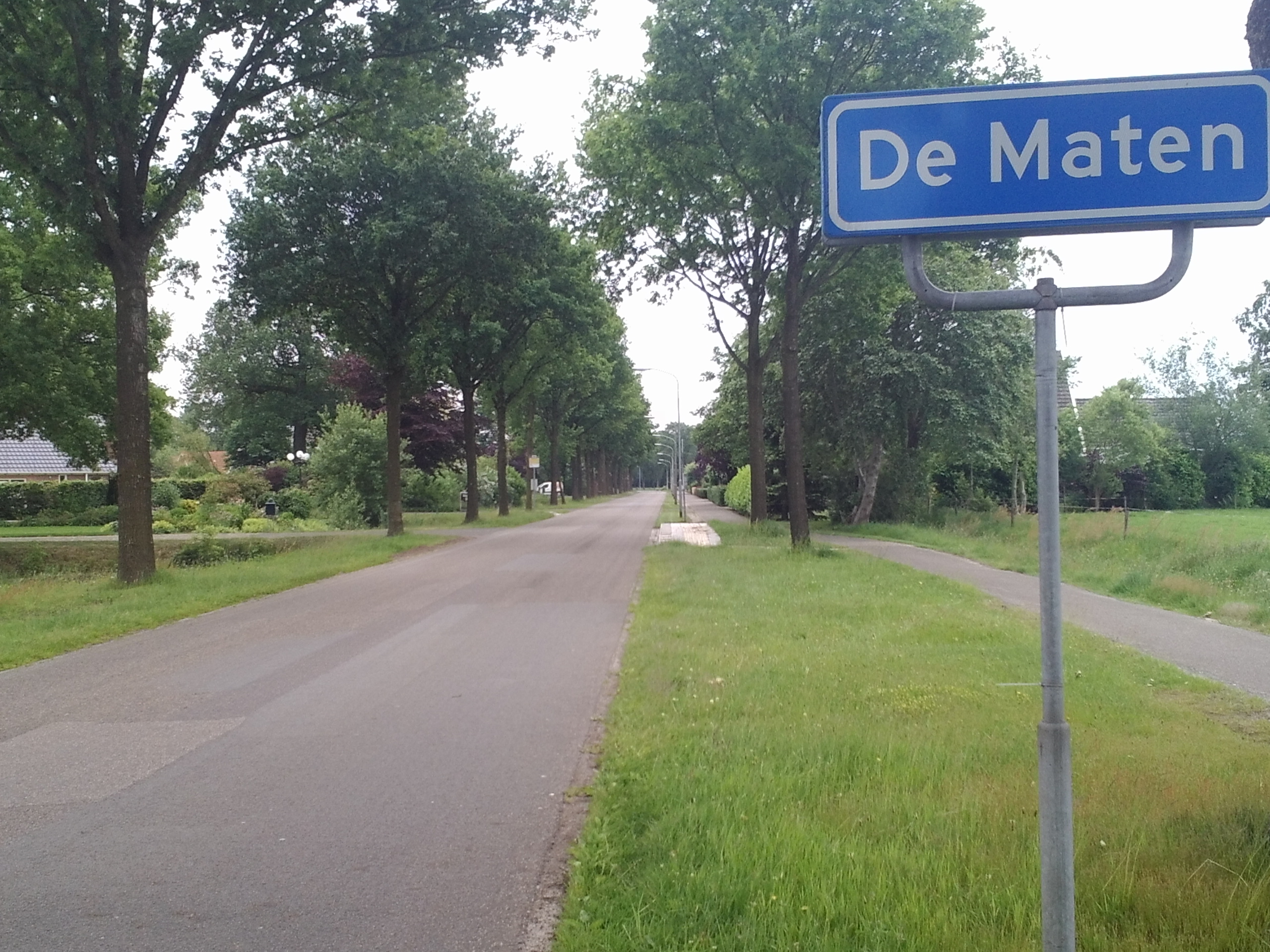

- Location in the province of Groningen in the Netherlands De Maten (Netherlands)
- Coordinates: 52°52′N 7°4′E
- Country: Netherlands
- Province: Groningen
- Municipality: Westerwolde

Area
  - Total: 3.82 km^{2} (1.47 sq mi)
- Elevation: 12 m (39 ft)

Population (2021)
  - Total: 250
  - Density: 65/km^{2} (170/sq mi)
- Time zone: UTC+1 (CET)
  - Summer (DST): UTC+2 (CEST)
- Postal code: 9561
- Dialing code: 0599

De Maten (Dutch: [də ˈmaːtə(n)]; Gronings: De Moaten [də ˈmʊːʔn̩]) is a hamlet in the Dutch province of Groningen. It is a part of the municipality of Westerwolde, and lies about 14 km northeast of Emmen.

It was first mentioned between 1851 and 1855 as de Maten, and means "hay land". De Maten is considered part of Ter Apel, but has place name signs. It was home to 317 people in 1840. Most of the hamlet used to be located in the municipality of Emmen. In 1976, it was moved to Ter Apel.
