= Leegkerk =

- Village
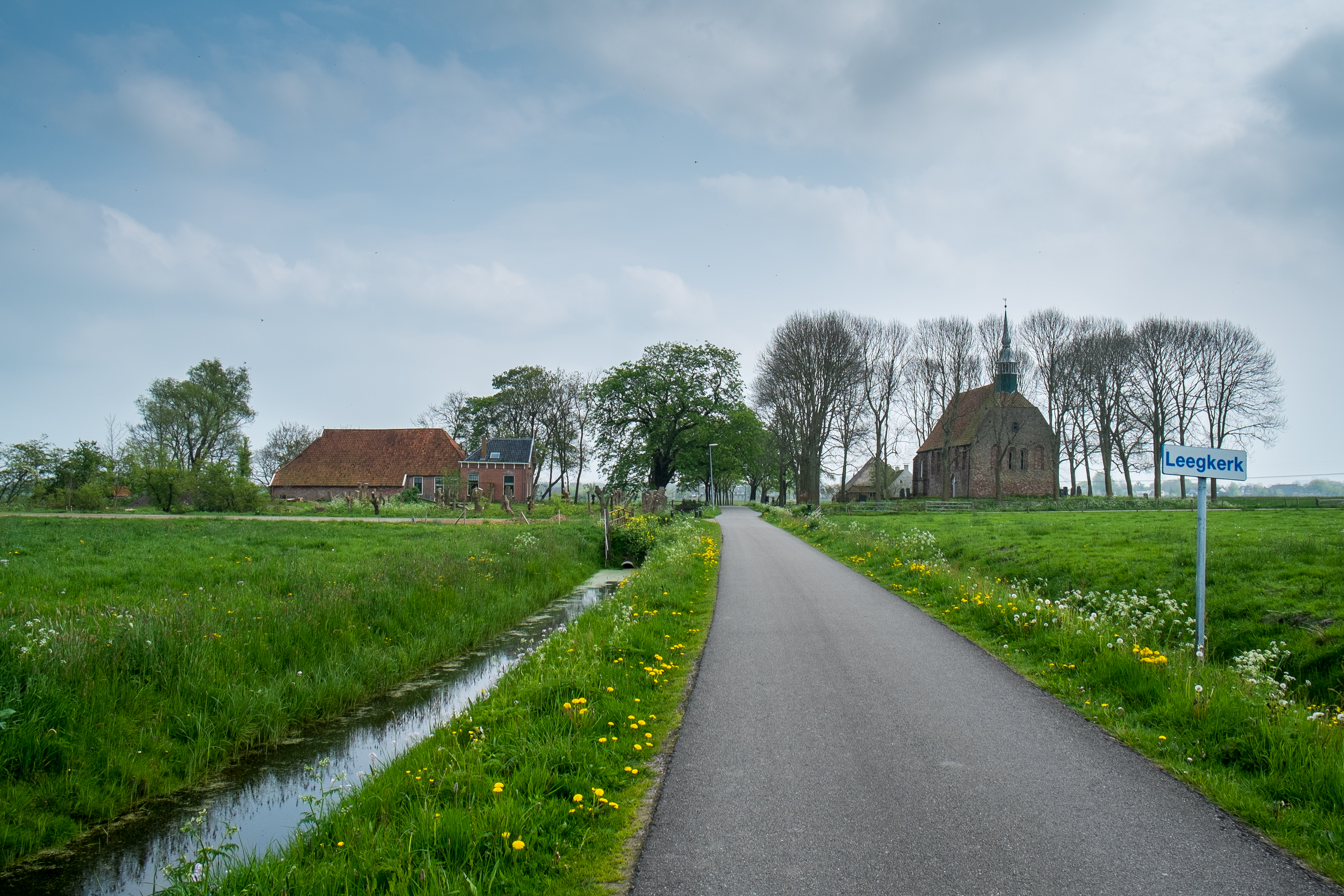
- View of Leegkerk

- Location of Leegkerk within the city of Groningen

- Location in the province of Groningen in the Netherlands Leegkerk (Netherlands)
- Coordinates: 53.23016°N 6.49040°E
- Country: Netherlands
- Province: Groningen
- Municipality: Groningen
- City: Groningen

Area
  - Total: 4.26 km^{2} (1.64 sq mi)
  - Land: 4.17 km^{2} (1.61 sq mi)
  - Water: 0.09 km^{2} (0.035 sq mi)
- Elevation: 1 m (3.3 ft)

Population (2023)
  - Total: 65
  - Density: 16/km^{2} (40/sq mi)
- Time zone: UTC+1 (CET)
  - Summer (DST): UTC+2 (CEST)
- Postcode: 9746
- Area code: 050

Leegkerk (Dutch: [ˌlexˈkɛr(ə)k]) is a small village in the municipality of Groningen in the Dutch province of Groningen with 65 inhabitants. It is located east of the city of Groningen, and north of the village of Hoogkerk.

The church of Leegkerk, built in the first half of the 13th century, is located here. Unconventionally, the church and surrounding buildings, a former parsonage and sacristy school, are located outside of the village's main core, which is located more eastern and currently grown against the Groningen residential area of Gravenburg.

== Etymology ==
The name means "low-lying church", to distinguish it from the southern high-lying church of Hoogkerk and as a reference to the low-lying area in which the place is located. The place was called Nortliuwarthrawaldt ("North Lieuwerderwolde") in 1335, a reference to the landscape Lieuwerderwolde in which it was located. The name Legakerke first appeared in 1385, a compound of Old Frisian leeg ("low, low-lying") and kerk ("church"). It is suspected that the name change has to do with the fact that the peat had been excavated at that time and the area around Leegkerk had become lower than the sand ridge on which Hoogkerk is located.

== Gallery ==
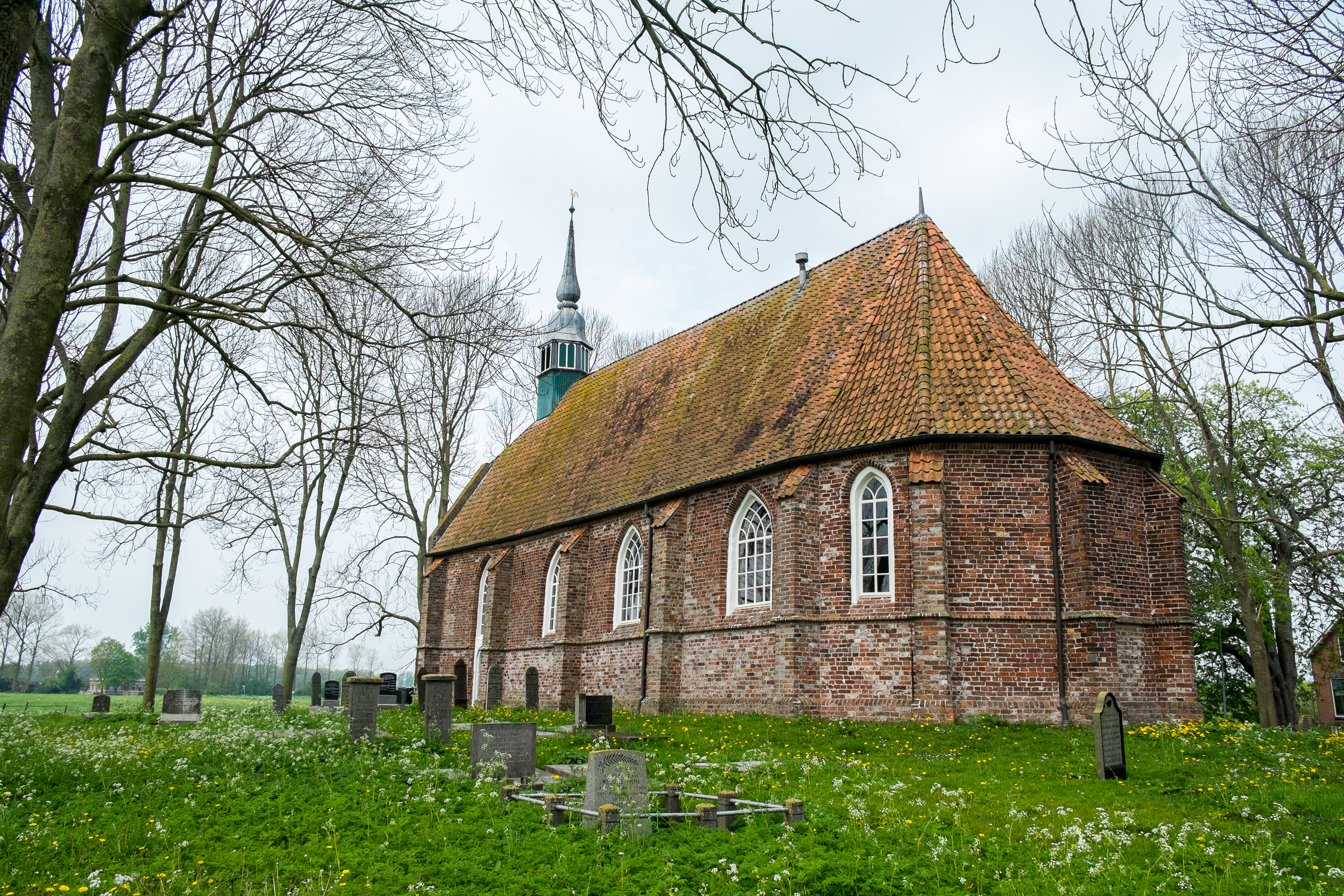
Church

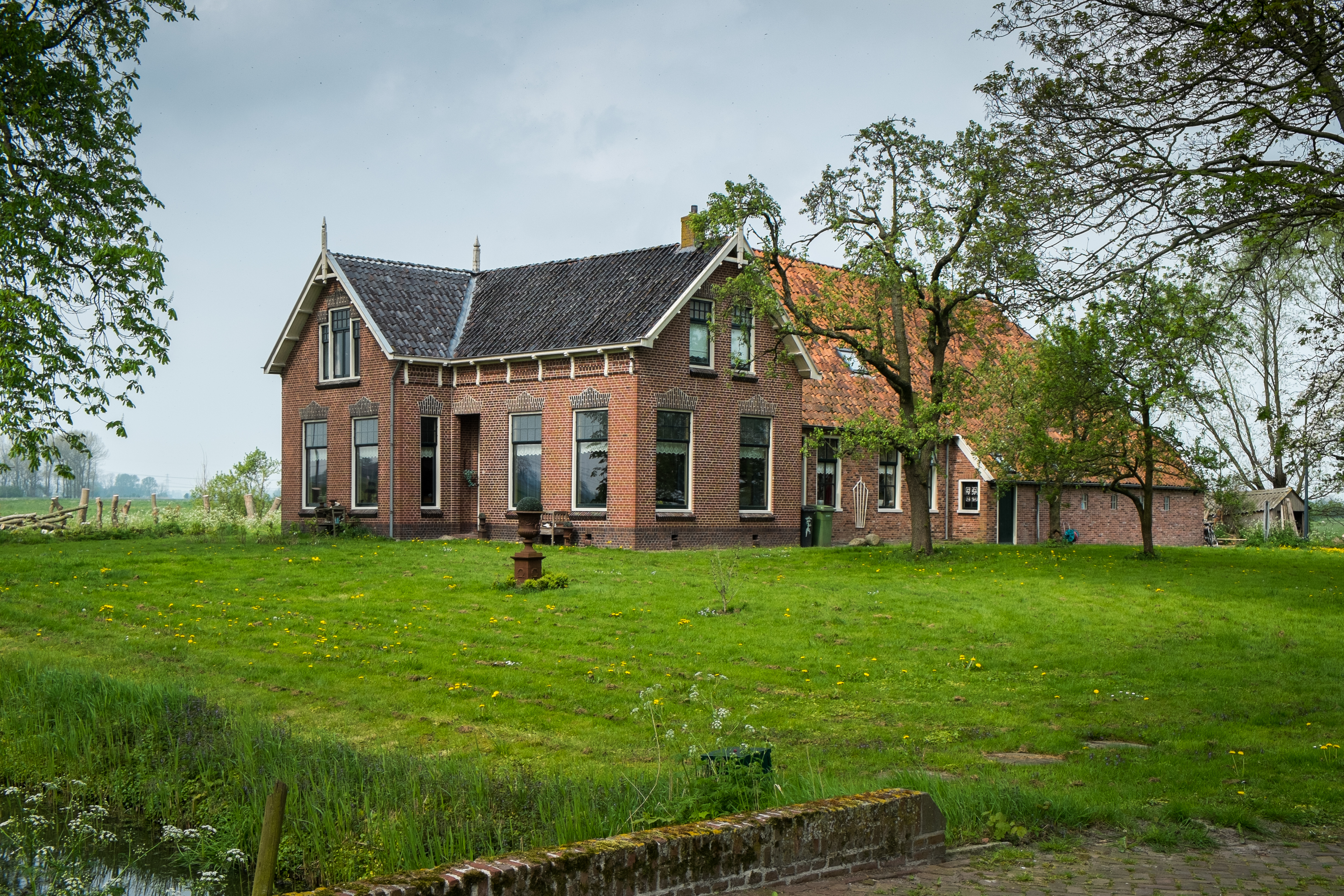
Former parsonage

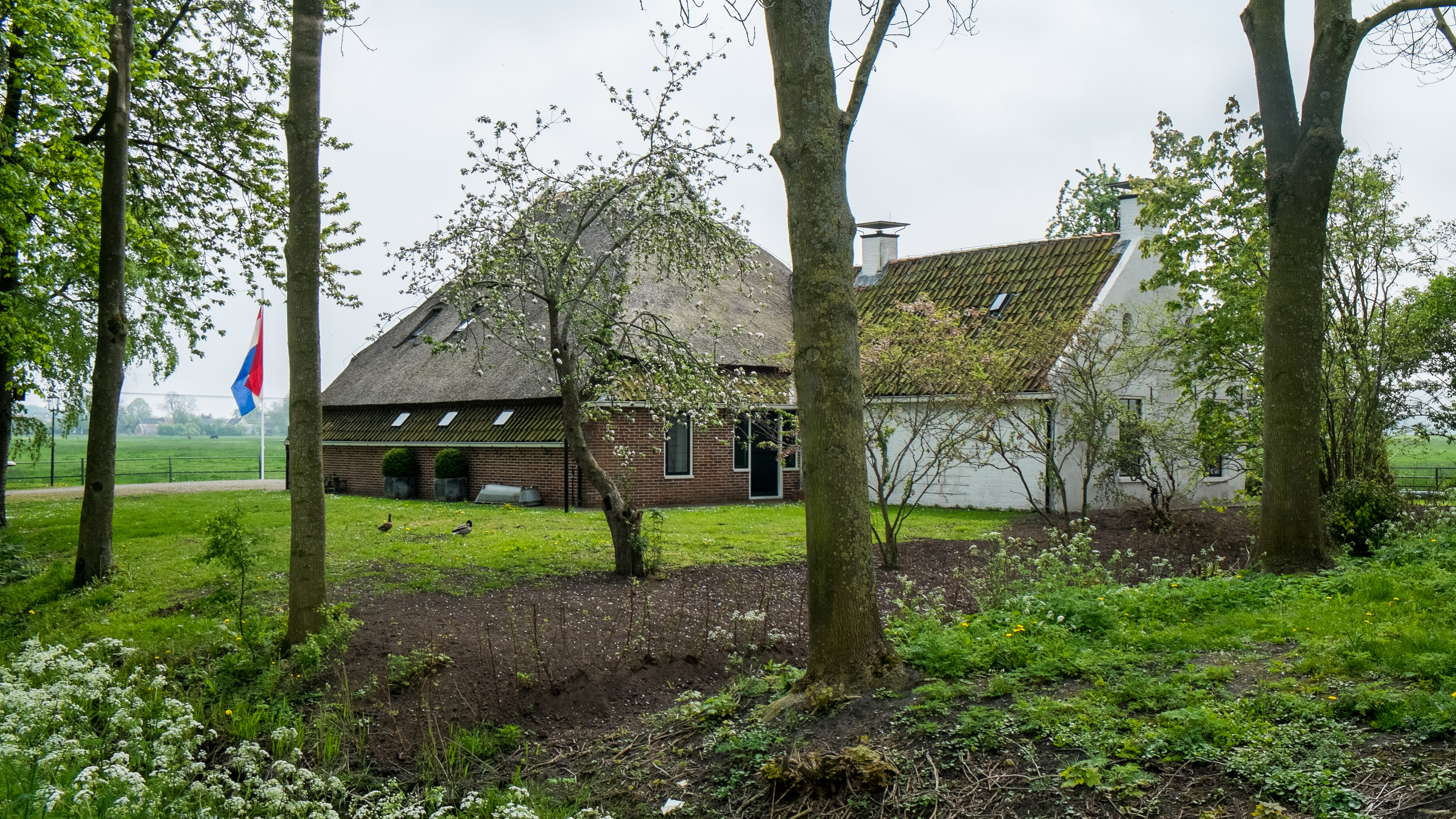
Former sacristy school
