= Agodorp =

- Hamlet
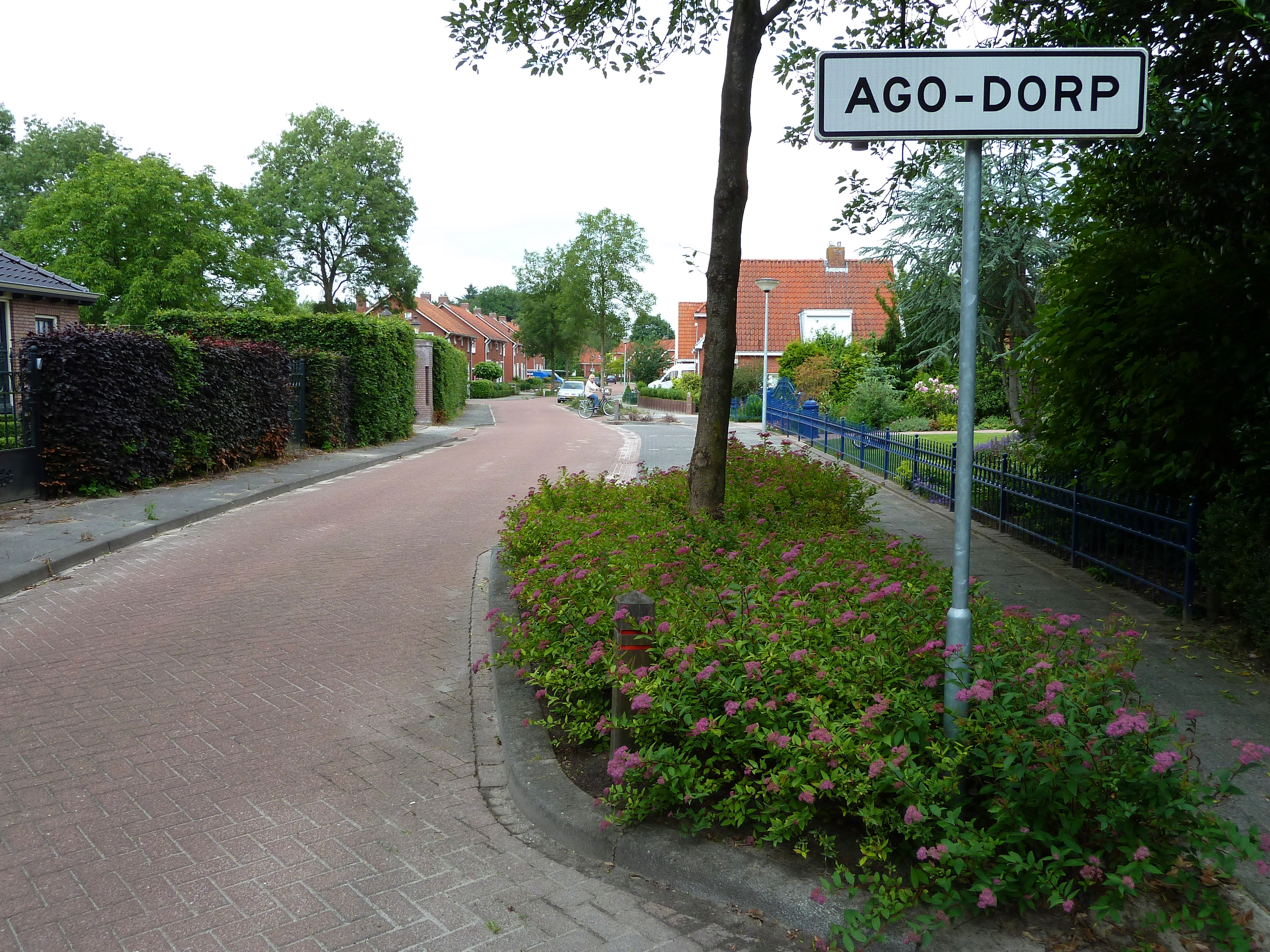
- Place name sign

- Location in the province of Groningen in the Netherlands Agodorp (Netherlands)
- Coordinates: 52.87116°N 7.08197°E
- Country: Netherlands
- Province: Groningen
- Municipality: Westerwolde
- Time zone: UTC+1 (CET)
  - Summer (DST): UTC+2 (CEST)
- Postal code: 9561
- Dialing code: 0599

Agodorp (Dutch pronunciation: [ˈaːɣoːdɔr(ə)p]) is a hamlet in the Dutch province of Groningen. It is a part of the municipality of Westerwolde, and lies about 16 km northeast of Emmen.

Agodorp is not a statistical entity, and the postal authorities have placed it under Ter Apel. Agodorp was place name signs since 2008. It consists of about 90 houses.

The village was first mentioned in 1968 as Agodorp, and refers to the 1921 neighbourhood built for the employees of AGO (Aardappelen, Groenten en Ooft).
