= Oosternieland =

- Village
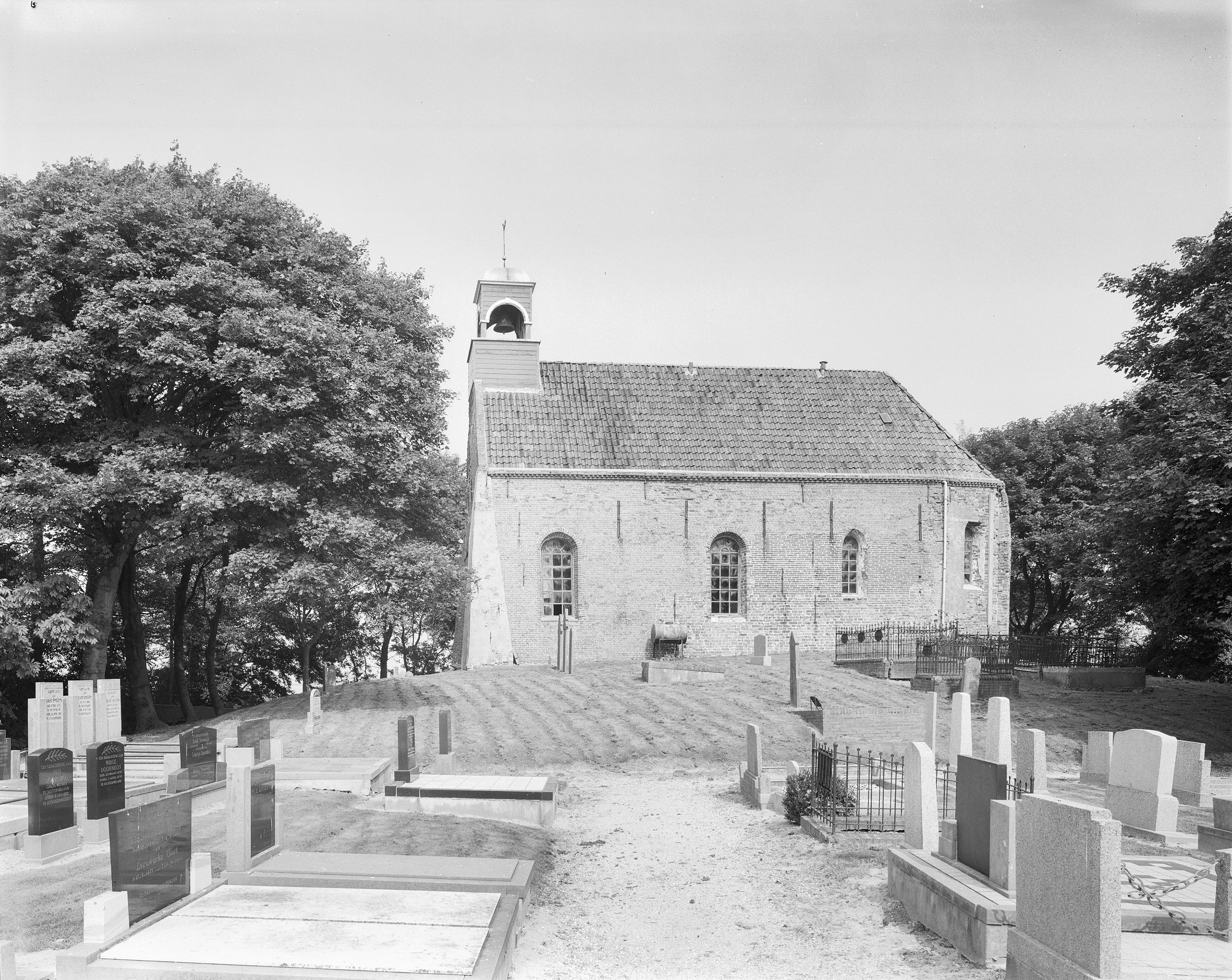
- Protestant church in 1984

- Location of Oosternieland in the province of Groningen Oosternieland (Netherlands)
- Coordinates: 53°24′0″N 6°45′18″E
- Country: Netherlands
- Province: Groningen
- Municipality: Het Hogeland

Area
  - Total: 0.54 km^{2} (0.21 sq mi)
- Elevation: 1.6 m (5.2 ft)

Population (2021)
  - Total: 100
  - Density: 190/km^{2} (480/sq mi)
- Time zone: UTC+1 (CET)
  - Summer (DST): UTC+2 (CEST)
- Postal code: 9985
- Dialing code: 0595

Oosternieland is a village in the municipality of Het Hogeland, Groningen, the Netherlands. It is located just north of Zijldijk, along the N46 road between the city of Groningen and the Eemshaven seaport. It had a population of around 100 in January 2017.

== History ==
The village was first mentioned in 1448 as "Enghelbert up den Nyen lande", and means "eastern new land". Oost (east) has been added to distinguish from Westernieland. The land was reclaimed after a dike was built in 1317. The village has a terp (artificial living hill) which contains a church from the 13th century. It used to have a tower, but it was demolished in 1822, and a ridge turret was place on the church instead.

Oosternieland was home to 308 people in 1840. It was part of Uithuizermeeden municipality before 1979, when it became part of Hefshuizen. In 2019, it became part of the municipality of Het Hogeland.

== Gallery ==
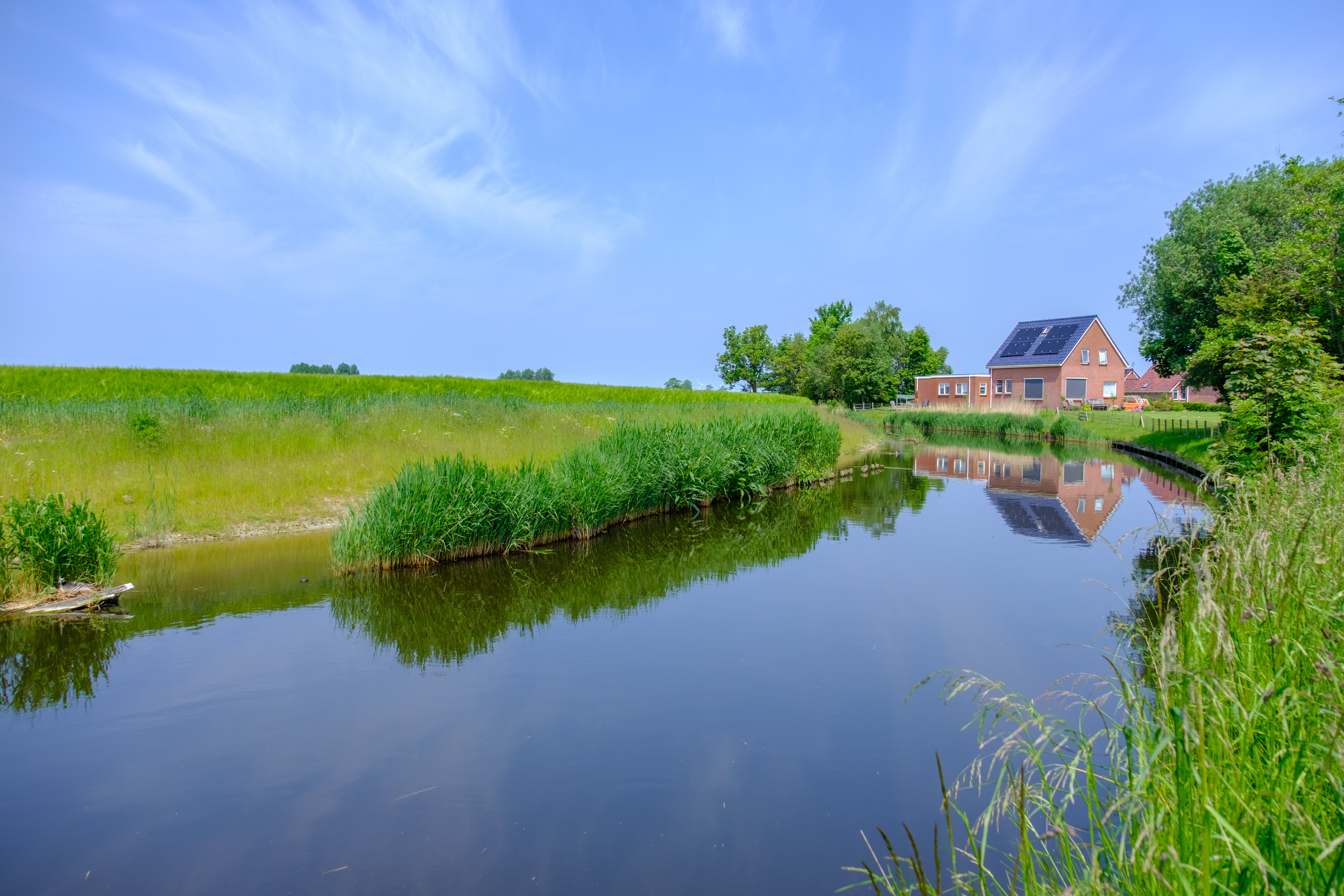
Canal view

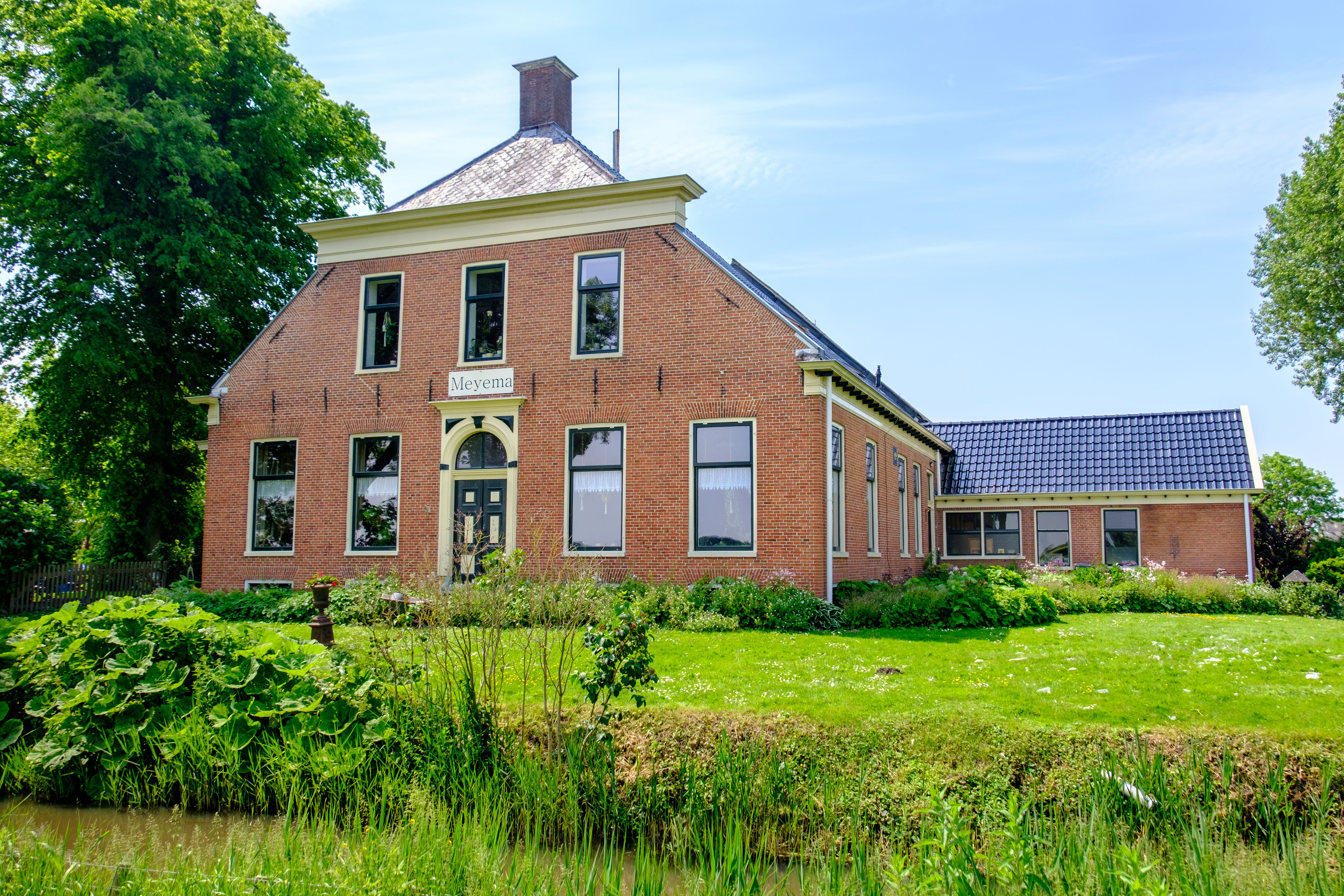
Farm in Oosternieland
