= Eppenhuizen =

- Hamlet
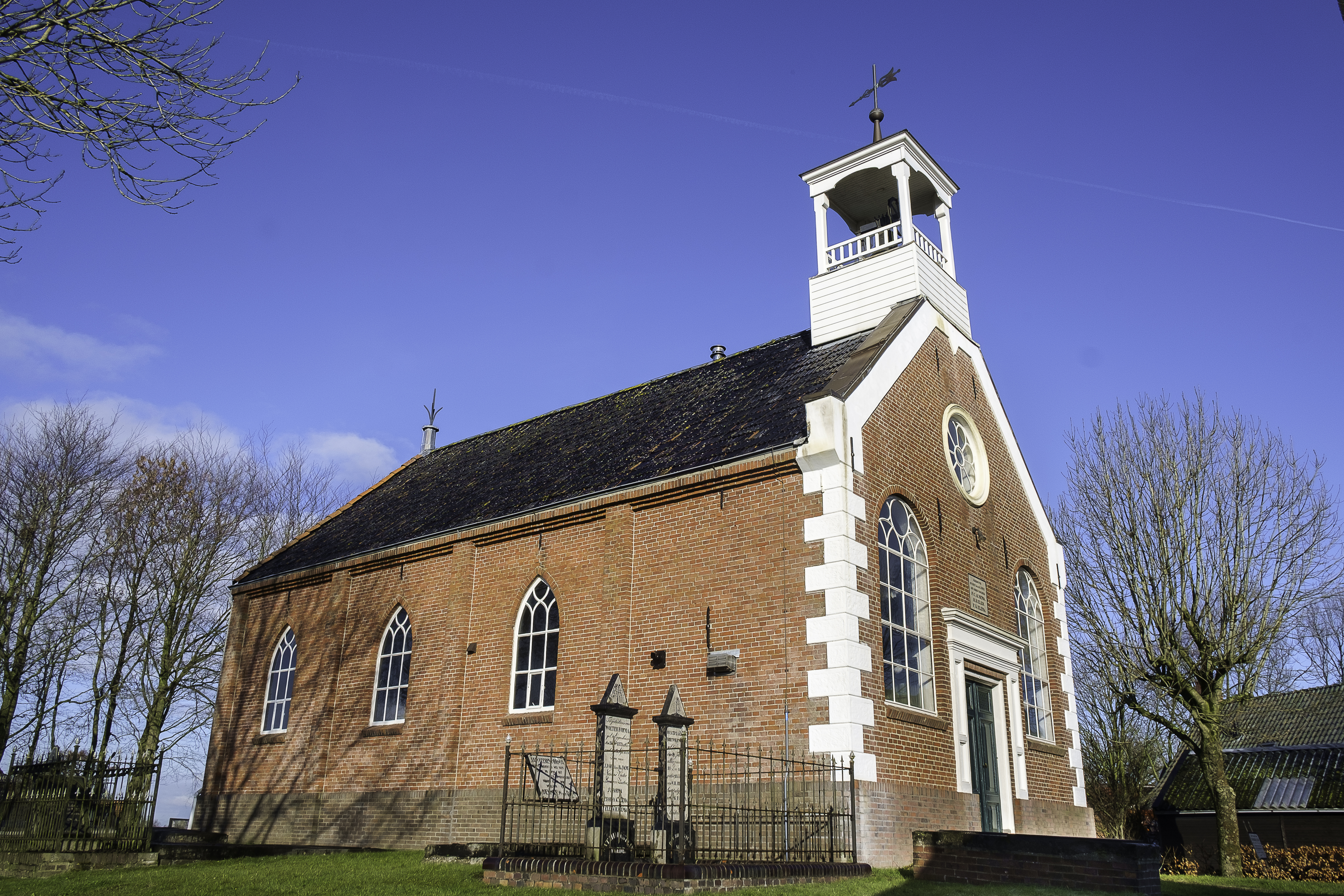

- Location of Eppenhuizen in the province of Groningen
- Coordinates: 53°22′49″N 6°41′33″E
- Country: Netherlands
- Province: Groningen
- Municipality: Het Hogeland

Population (2017)
  - Total: 50
- Time zone: UTC+1 (CET)
  - Summer (DST): UTC+2 (CEST)
- Postal code: 9996
- Dialing code: 0595

Eppenhuizen is a hamlet in the Dutch province of Groningen. It had a population of around 50 in January 2017.
