= Startenhuizen =

- Hamlet
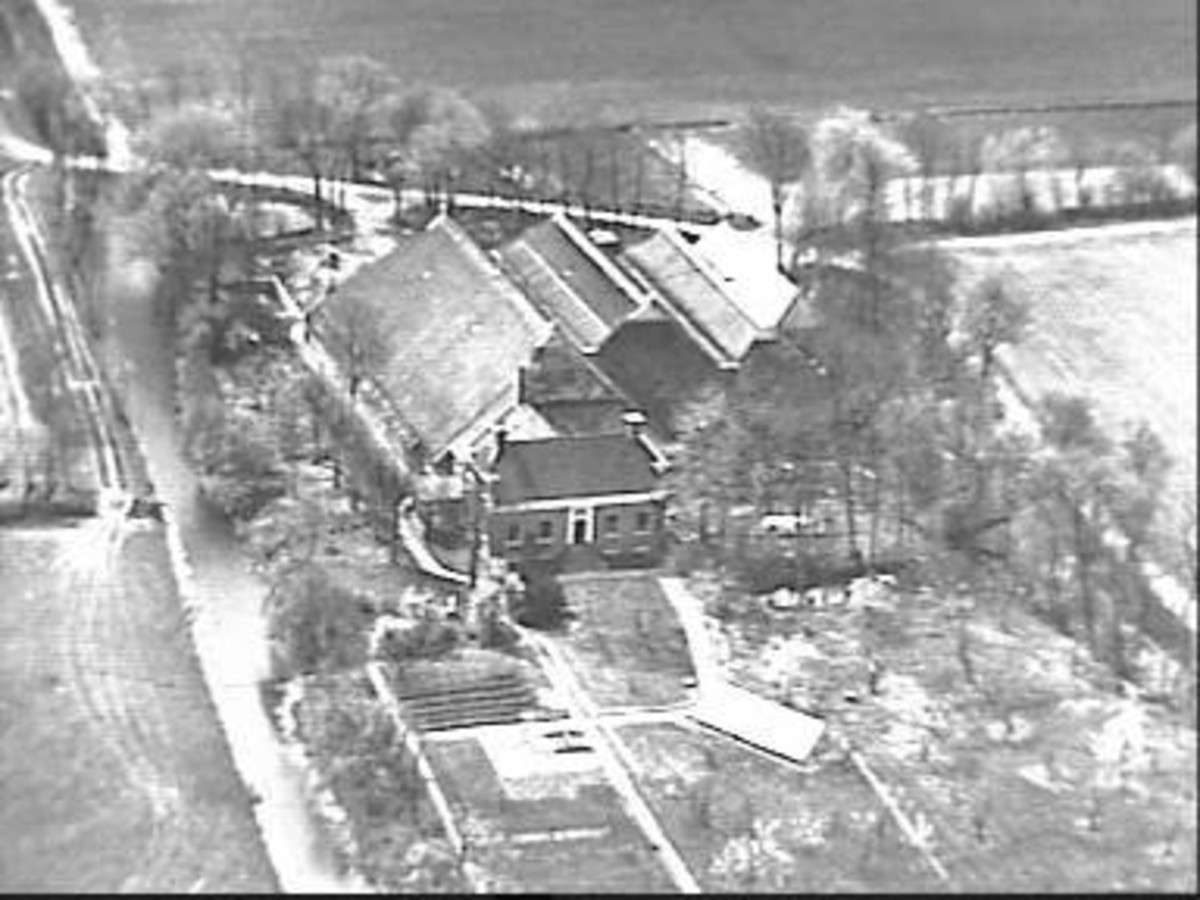
- Farm in Startenhuizen

- Location in the province of Groningen in the Netherlands Startenhuizen (Netherlands)
- Coordinates: 53.3686°N 6.7071°E
- Country: Netherlands
- Province: Groningen
- Municipalities: Het Hogeland and Eemsdelta
- Time zone: UTC+1 (CET)
  - Summer (DST): UTC+2 (CEST)
- Postal code: 9924
- Dialing code: 0595

Startenhuizen (Dutch pronunciation: [ˈstɑrtə(n)ˌɦœyzə(n)]) is a hamlet at the border of the municipals Het Hogeland and Eemsdelta in the northeastern Netherlands. It is divided in two parts, the biggest in Eemsdelta, and a few farms in Het Hogeland.

Startenhuizen is not a statistical entity, and the postal authorities have placed it under Startenhuizen. It had place name signs, however some have been removed.

The hamlet was first mentioned in 1391 as "to Stertingahusum". The etymology is unclear. In 1590, the church was demolished, and never replaced. Startenhuizen was home to 112 people in 1840. Nowadays, it consists of about 17 houses.
