= Zandeweer =

- Village
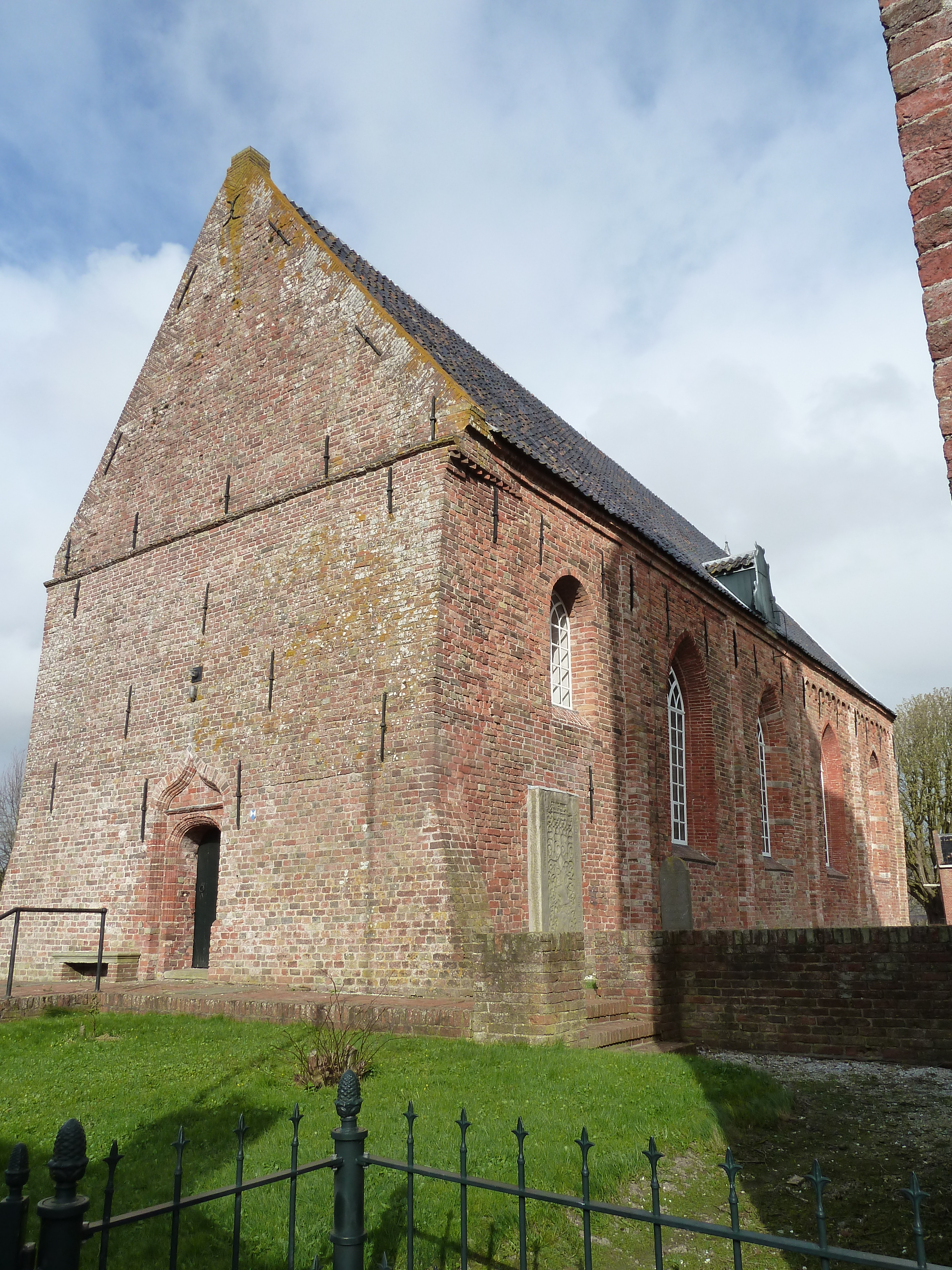
- Zandeweer Church

- Location of Oldenzijl in the province of Groningen Zandeweer (Netherlands)
- Coordinates: 53°23′N 6°41′E
- Country: Netherlands
- Province: Groningen
- Municipality: Het Hogeland

Area
  - Total: 0.43 km^{2} (0.17 sq mi)
- Elevation: 0.7 m (2.3 ft)

Population (2021)
  - Total: 450
  - Density: 1,000/km^{2} (2,700/sq mi)
- Time zone: UTC+1 (CET)
  - Summer (DST): UTC+2 (CEST)
- Postal code: 9997
- Dialing code: 0595

Zandeweer is a village in Het Hogeland municipality in the Dutch province of Groningen. It had a population of around 475 in January 2017.

== History ==
It was part of Kantens municipality before 1990, when it became part of Hefshuizen.

== Gallery ==
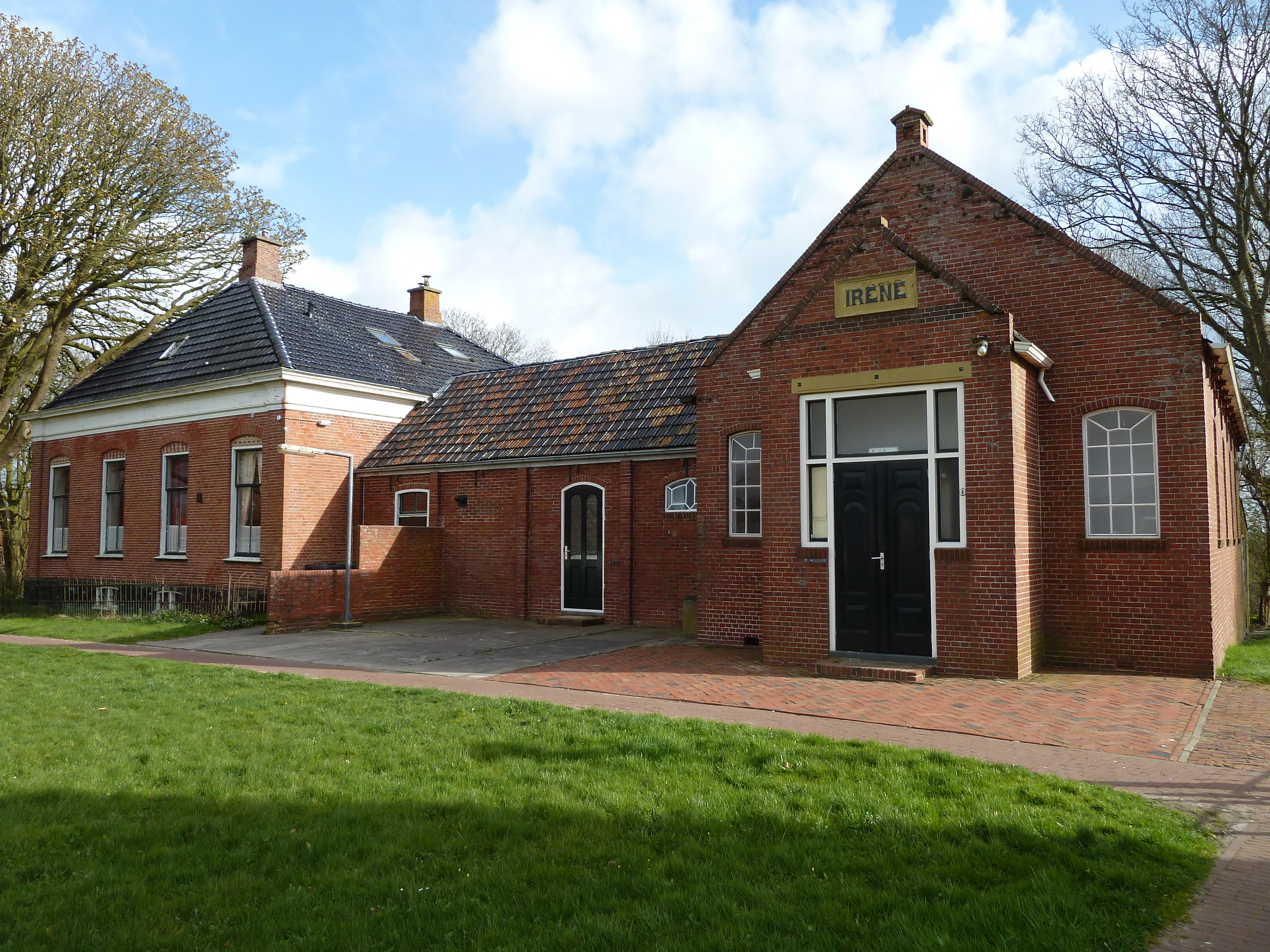
Former clergy house and meeting centre

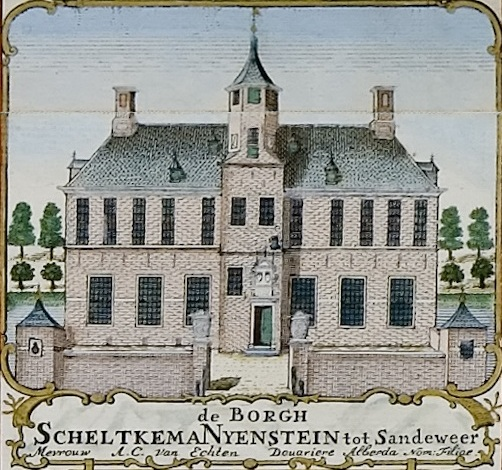
Borg Scheltkema-Nijenstein

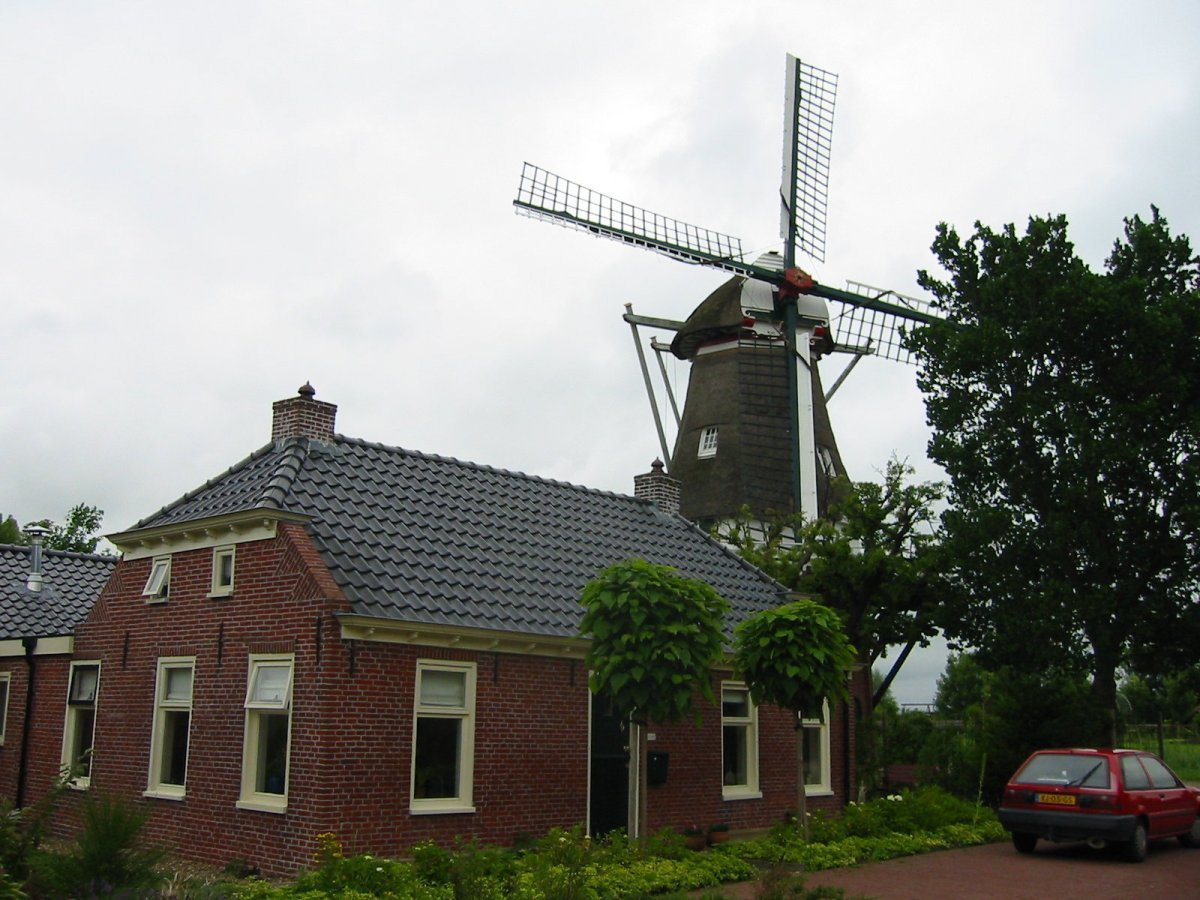
House and wind mill windlust
