= Oosteinde, Groningen =

Oosteinde
- Village
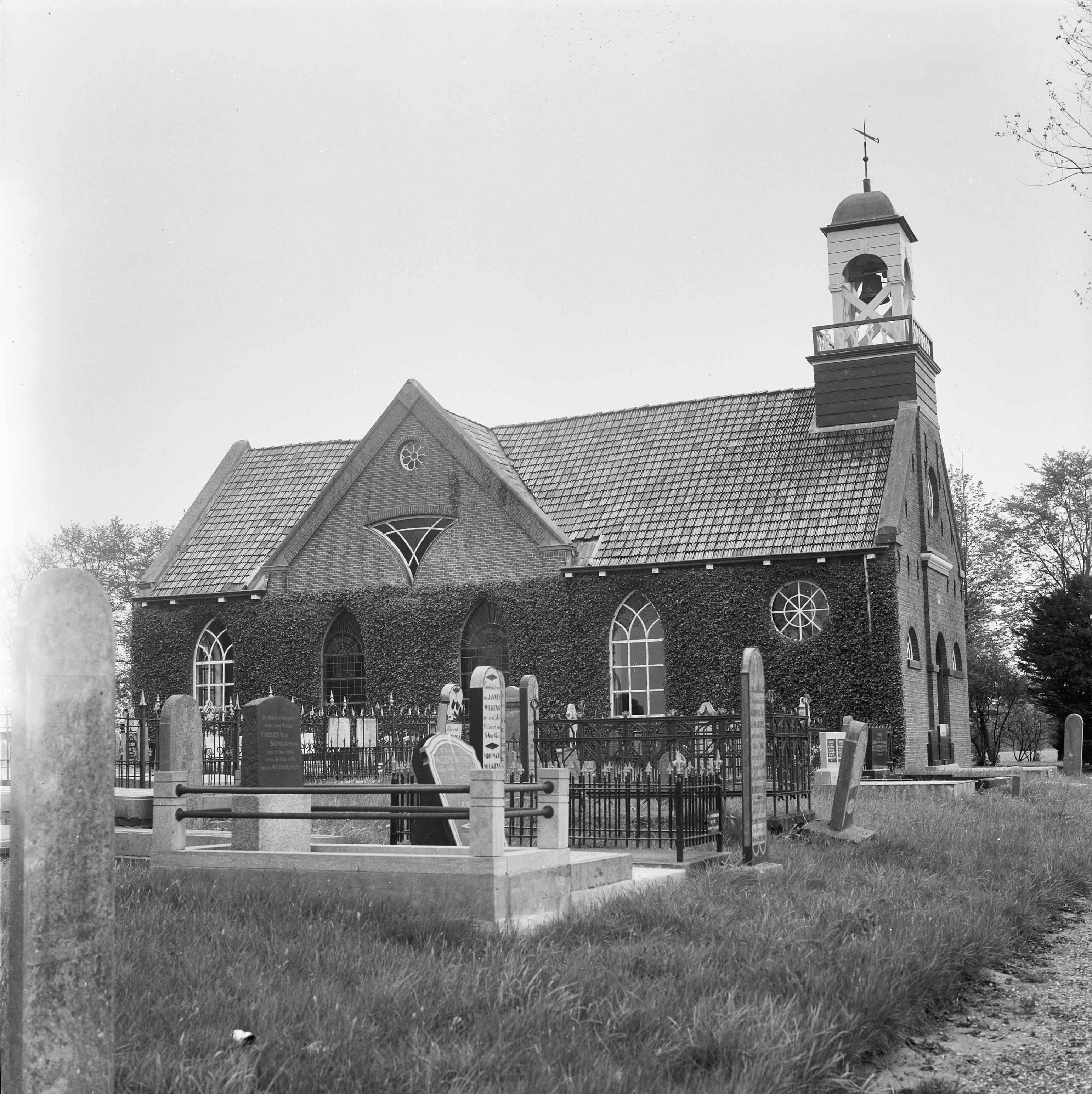
- Church in 1969

- Location of Oosteinde in the province of Groningen Oosteinde (Netherlands)
- Coordinates: 53°24′49″N 6°47′37″E
- Country: Netherlands
- Province: Groningen
- Municipality: Het Hogeland

Area
  - Total: 0.38 km^{2} (0.15 sq mi)
- Elevation: 1.3 m (4.3 ft)

Population (2021)
  - Total: 160
  - Density: 420/km^{2} (1,100/sq mi)
- Time zone: UTC+1 (CET)
  - Summer (DST): UTC+2 (CEST)
- Postal code: 9983
- Dialing code: 0595

Oosteinde is a village in the municipality of Het Hogeland, Groningen, the Netherlands. It is located southeast of Roodeschool, near the river Groote Tjariet. It had a population of around 160 in January 2017.

== History ==
The village was first mentioned between 1851 and 1855 as Oosteinde, and means "eastern end". The Groote Tjariet River is located to the east of the village.

In 1846, a church was built in Oosteinde which was also intended for the nearby village of Oudeschip. It was part of Uithuizermeeden municipality before 1979, when it became part of Hefshuizen. In 2019, it became part of the municipality of Het Hogeland.

== Gallery ==
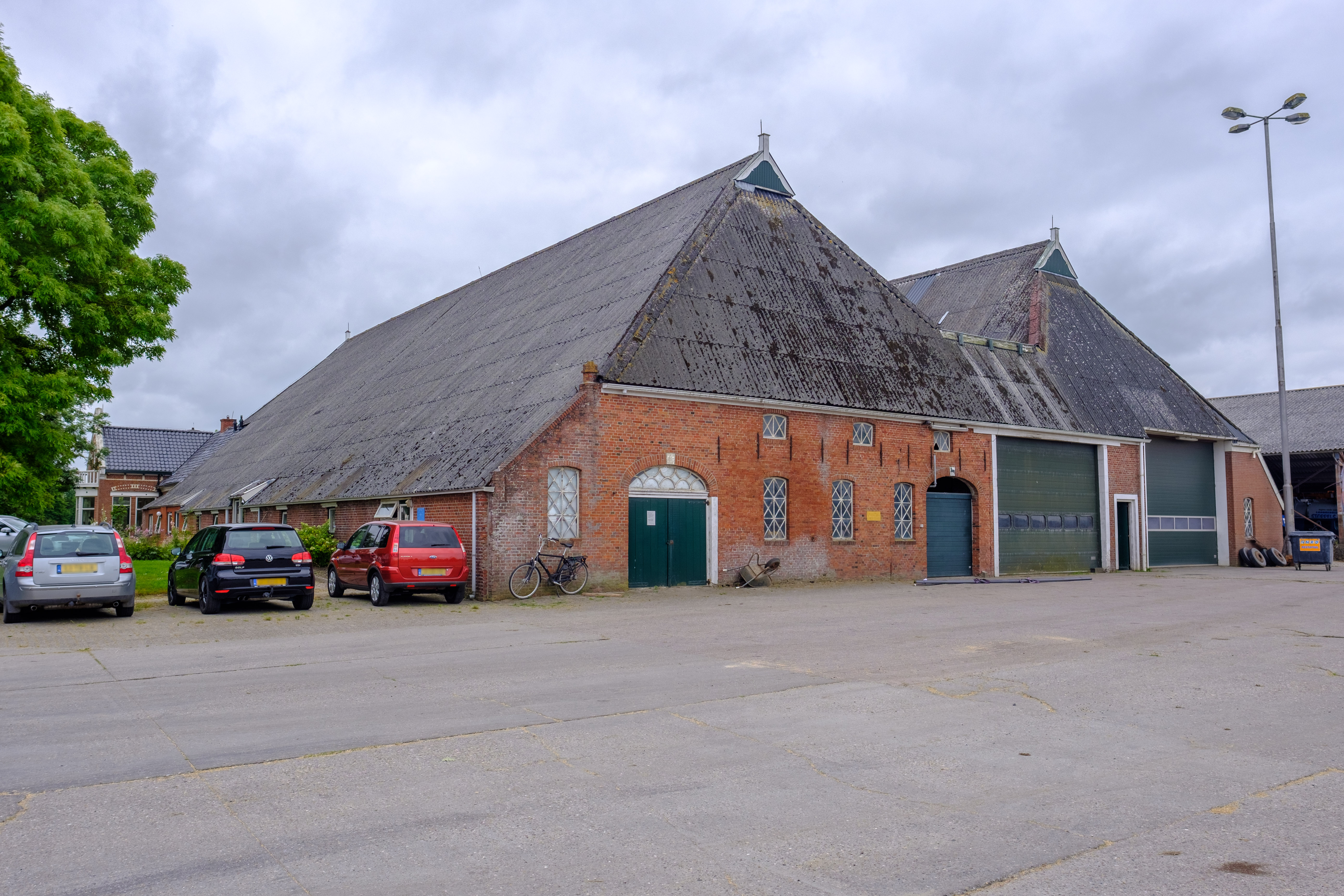
Farm in Oosteinde

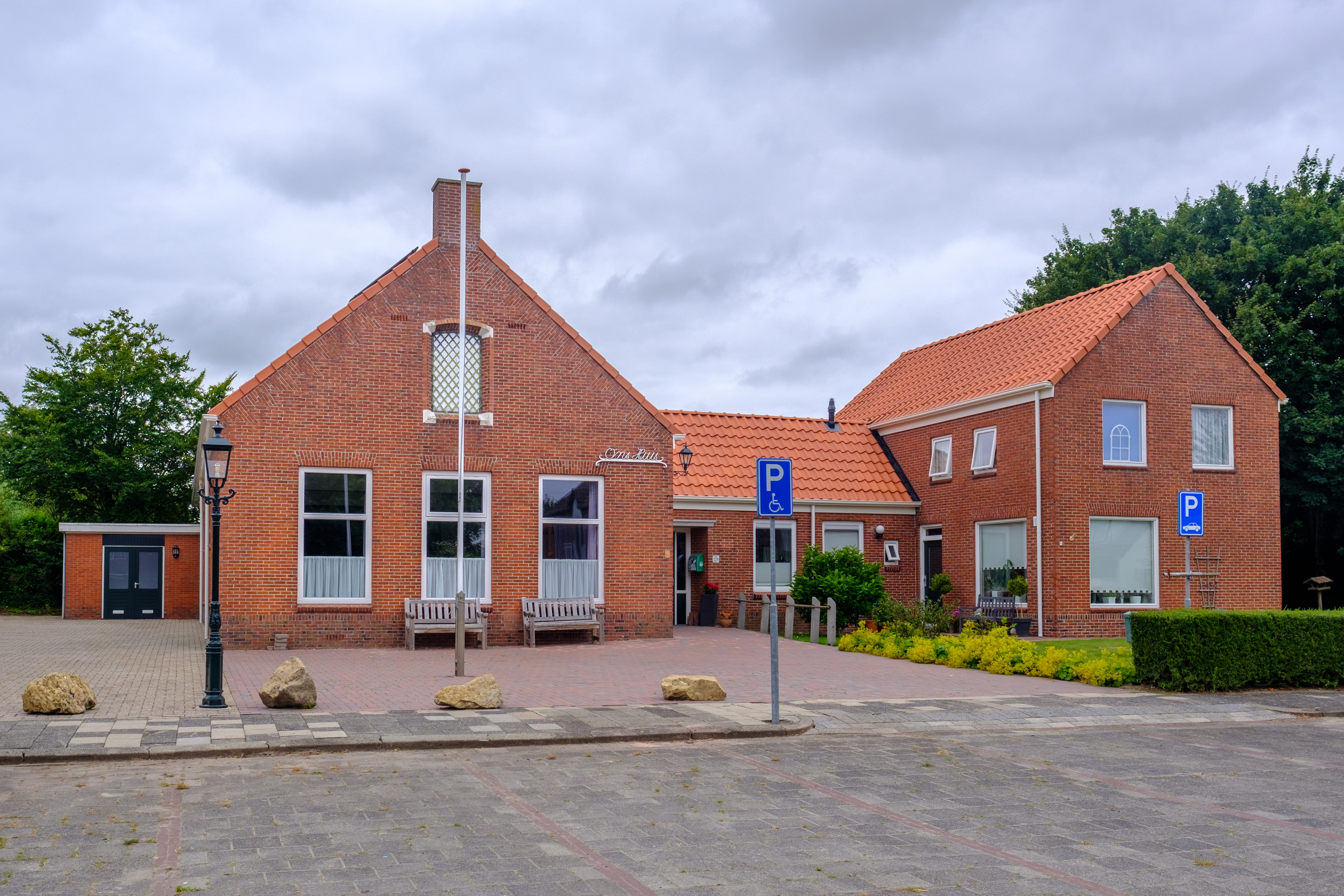
Village house

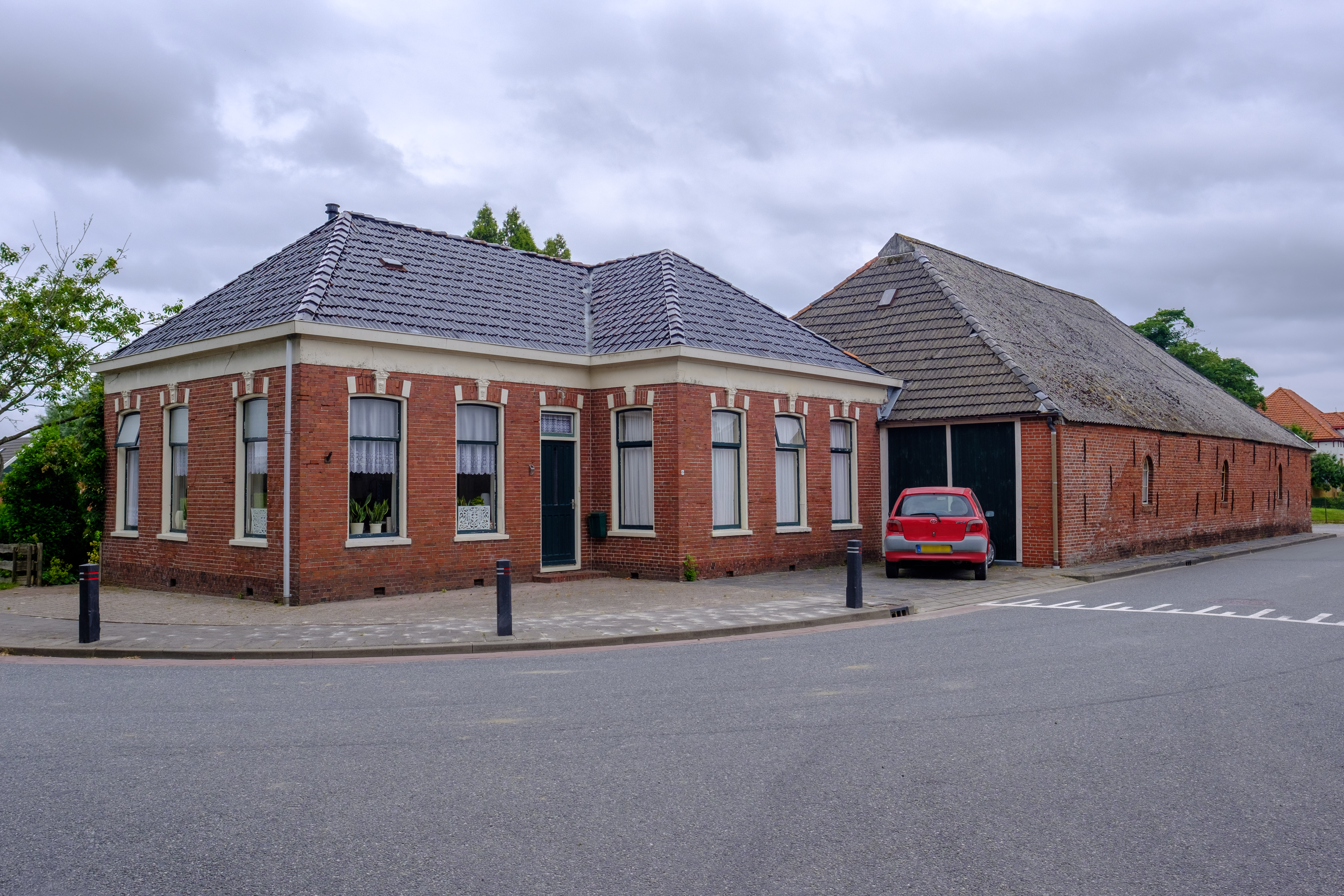
House/farm in Oosteinde
