= Stitswerd =

- Village
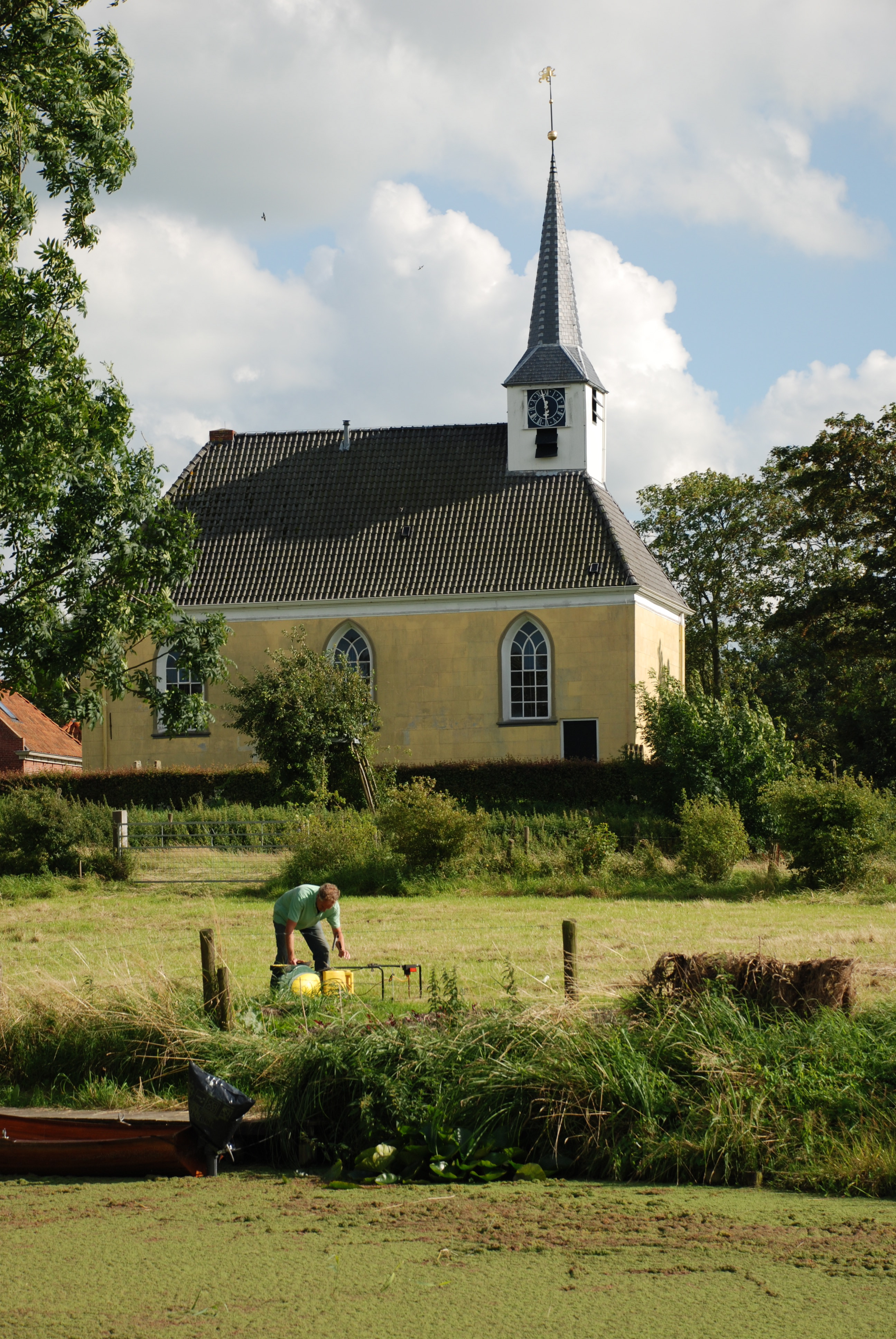
- The church of Stitswerd

- Location of Stitswerd in the province of Groningen Stitswerd (Netherlands)
- Coordinates: 53°21′40″N 6°35′57″E
- Country: Netherlands
- Province: Groningen
- Municipality: Het Hogeland

Area
  - Total: 0.18 km^{2} (0.069 sq mi)
- Elevation: 0.4 m (1.3 ft)

Population (2021)
  - Total: 60
  - Density: 330/km^{2} (860/sq mi)
- Time zone: UTC+1 (CET)
  - Summer (DST): UTC+2 (CEST)
- Postal code: 9999
- Dialing code: 0595

Stitswerd is a village in the municipality of Het Hogeland, Groningen, the Netherlands. It had a population of around 45 in January 2017. Stitswerd is located on a wierde near the estuary of the former river Fivel.

Stitswerd has the highest postal code in the Netherlands (9999 XL).

== History ==
The village was first mentioned in the second half of the 9th century as Stukisweret, and means "terp (artificial living hill) of Stukki (person)".

The Dutch Reformed church dates from the 13th century and is located on the terp, however part of the terp has been excavated. The church is sometimes in service, but is also used for cultural activities.

Stitswert was home to 209 people 1840. It was part of Kantens municipality before 1990, when it became part of Hefshuizen. In 2019, it became part of the municipality of Het Hogeland.

== Gallery ==
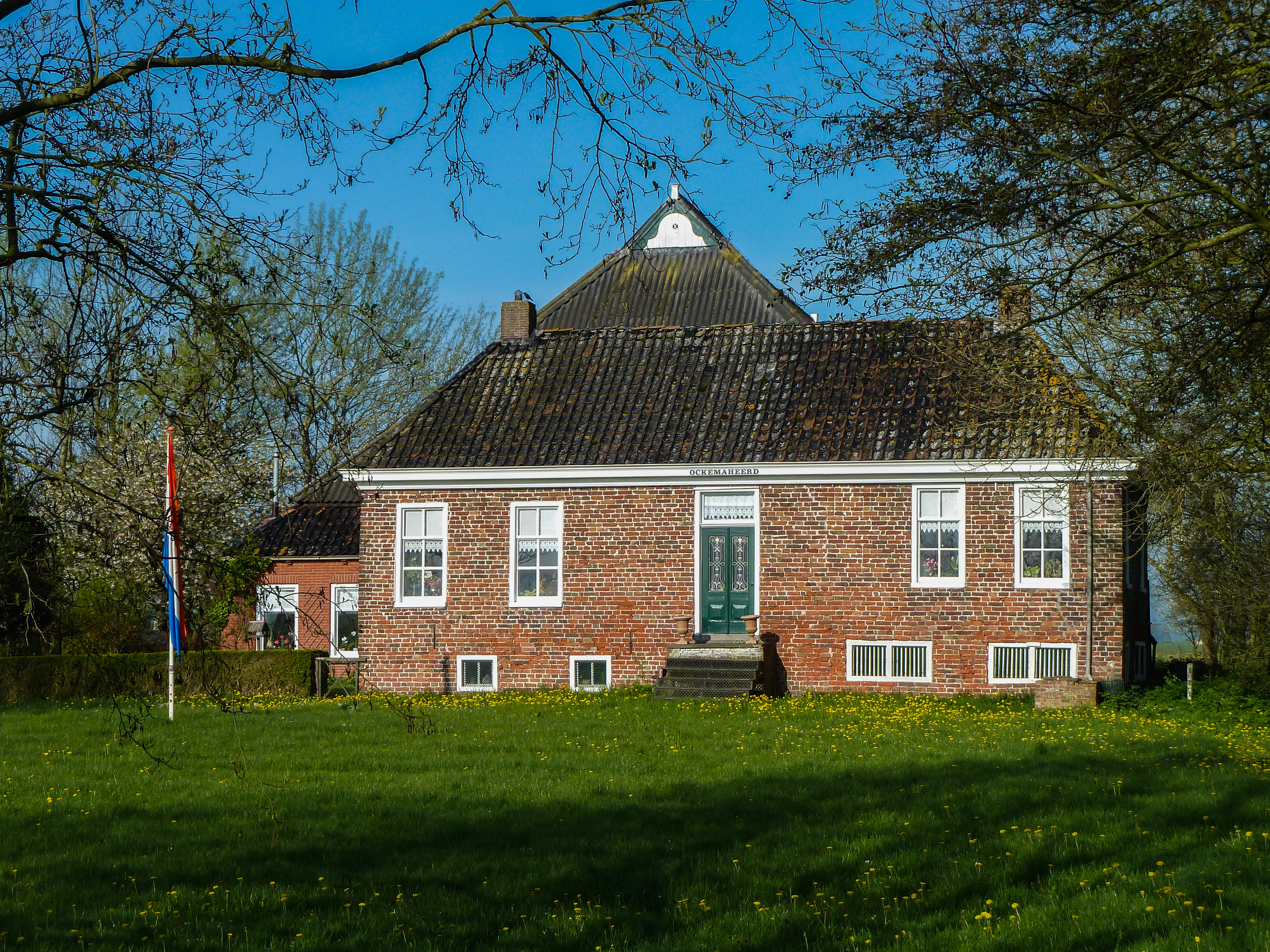
Farm in Stitswerd

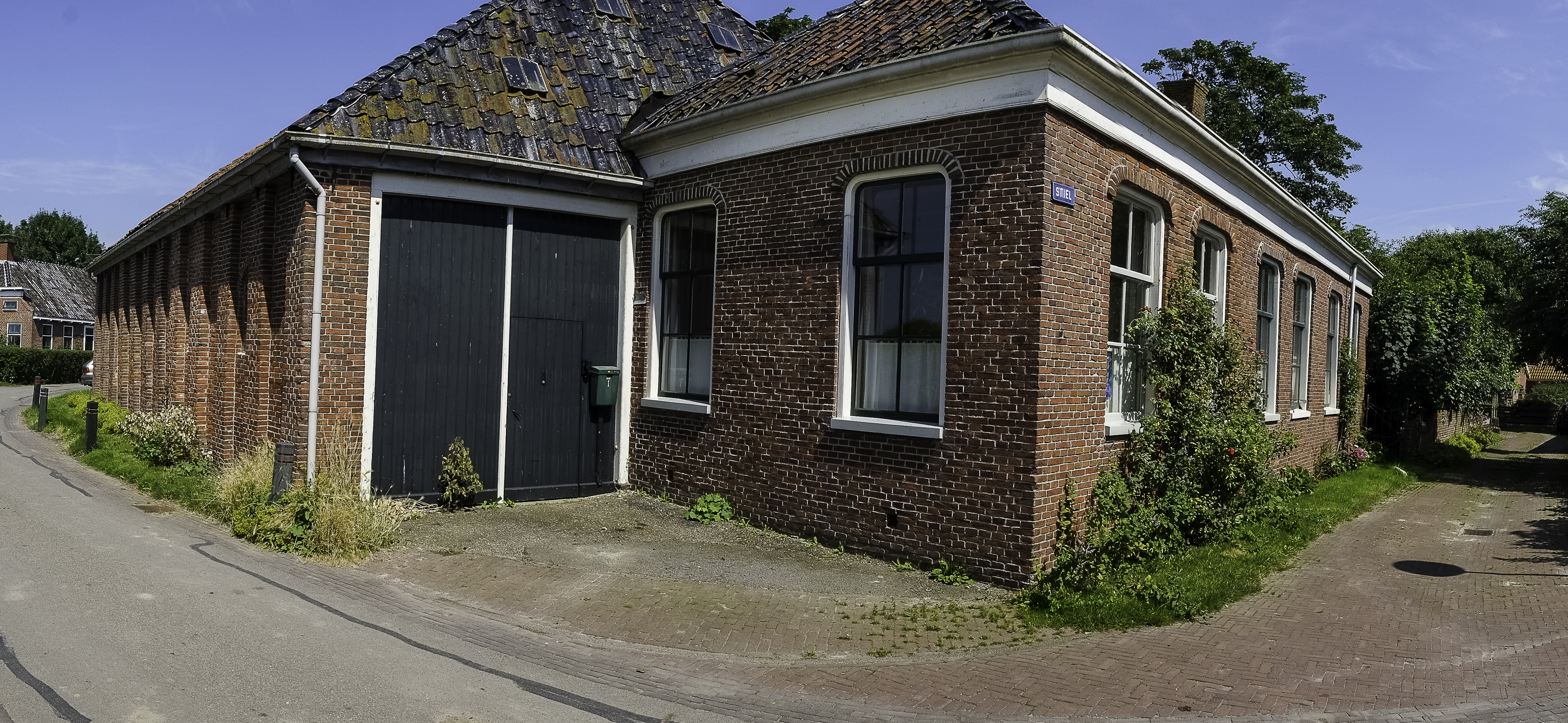
Former pub

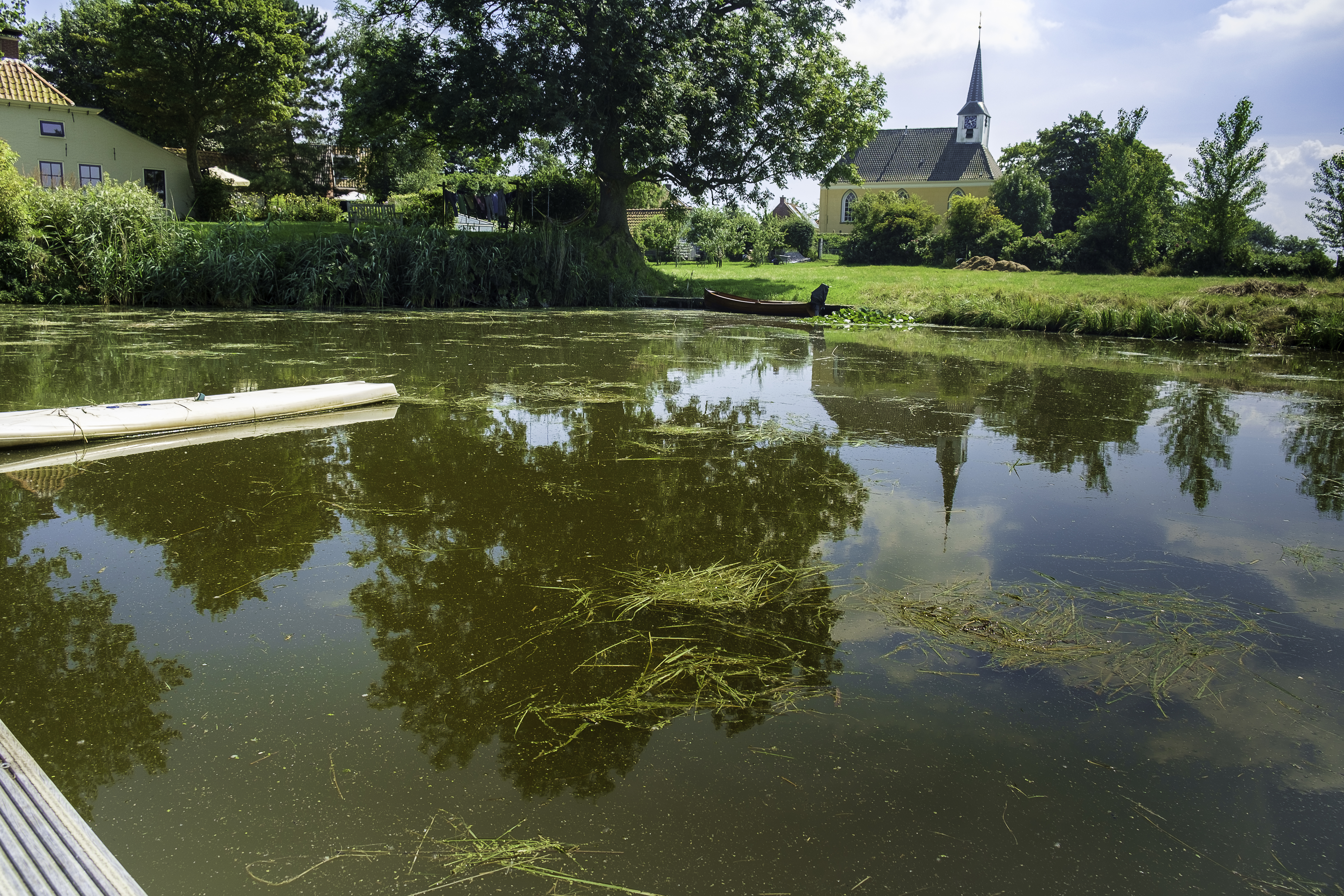
Harbour of Stitswerd
