= Kleine Huisjes =

- Village
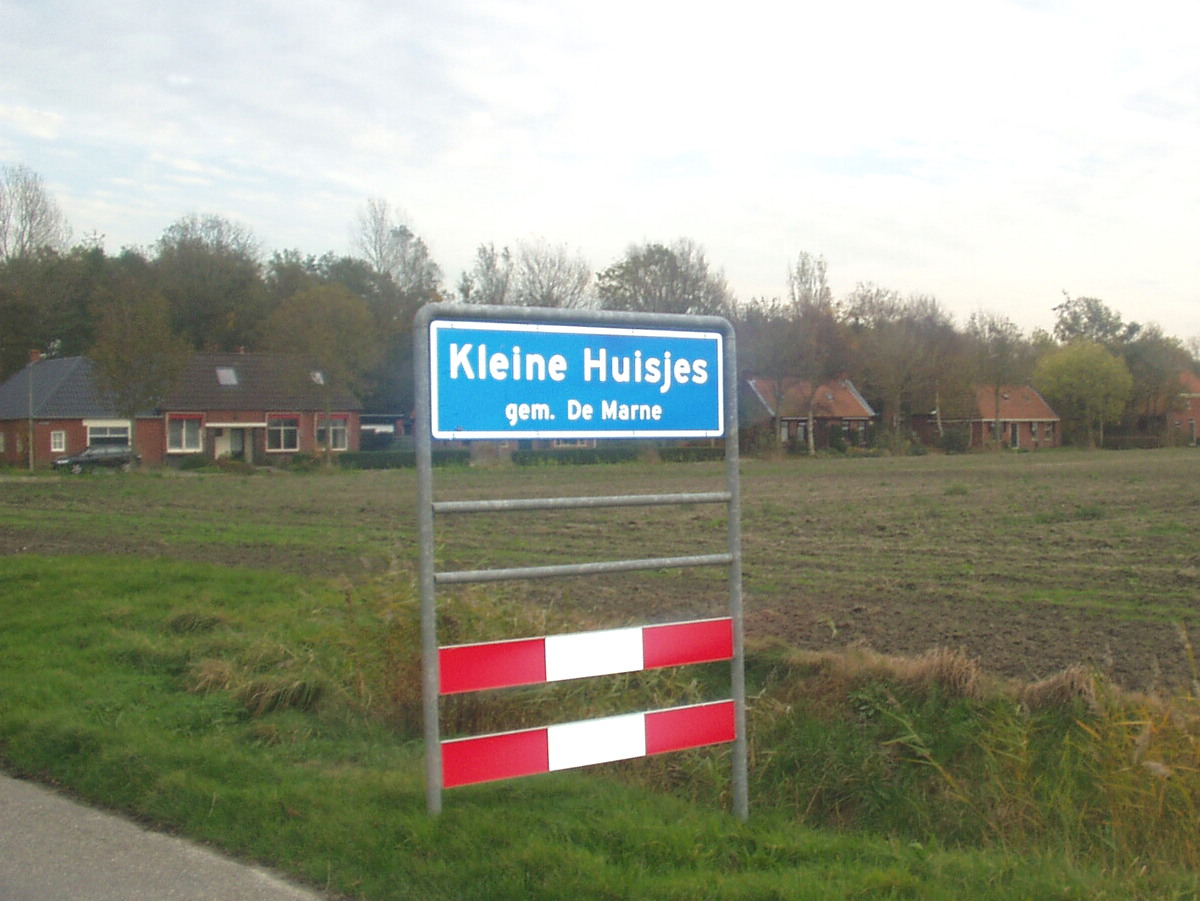
- Kleine Huisjes town limit

- Location in province of Groningen in the Netherlands Kleine Huisjes (Netherlands)
- Coordinates: 53.39501°N 6.40692°E
- Country: Netherlands
- Province: Groningen
- Municipality: Het Hogeland

Area
  - Total: 0.25 km^{2} (0.097 sq mi)
- Elevation: 1 m (3.3 ft)

Population (2021)
  - Total: 75
  - Density: 300/km^{2} (780/sq mi)
- Time zone: UTC+1 (CET)
  - Summer (DST): UTC+2 (CEST)
- Postal code: 9977
- Dialing code: 0595
- Website: kleine-huisjes.nl

Kleine Huisjes (also: Lutjeboeren; Gronings: Lutje Hoeskes; translation: Little Houses) is a village in the Dutch province of Groningen. It is a part of the municipality of Het Hogeland. It is located 1.5 kilometres (0.93 mi) north-east of Kloosterburen.

== Etymology ==
The name translates as Little Houses, and refers to the little houses which were built for the farm workers.

== History ==
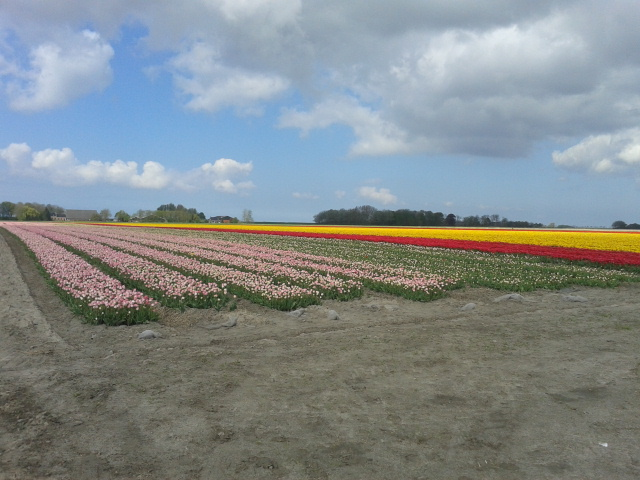
Tulip field near Kleine Huisjes

Kleine Huisjes was part of a salt marsh wall which was about 1 metre above sea level. Habitation started in the 11th or 12th century, and the land was protected by a dike around 1250. In the mid-18th century, little houses were constructed for the workers who poldered the land and worked on the farms. In 1827, it was first mentioned as Lutjeboeren (Little Farmers). Around 1900, the village was referred to as Kleine Huisjes on maps.

The postal authority does not recognise Kleine Huisjes as a separate entity and has put it under Kloosterburen. The village is recognised as a statistical entity, but it does not have many inhabitants, and no church. Nevertheless, the villagers insist that it is a village and not a hamlet.

Up to 1989, Kleine Huisjes was part of the municipality of Kloosterburen. In 1990, it was merged into De Marne which was merged into Het Hogeland in 2019.
