= Adriaan van Veldhuizen =

Dutch politician (1932–2013)

Member of the Senate
- In office 20 September 1977 – 12 June 1995

Member of the Hefshuizen Municipal Council
- In office 2 January 1979 – 30 April 1970

Member of the Uithuizen Municipal Council
- In office 1 September 1974 – 31 December 1978

Member of the Provincial Council of Groningen
- In office 1 December 1972 – 6 June 1978

Personal details
- Born: Adrianus van Veldhuizen; 4 February 1932 Groningen, Netherlands
- Died: 6 April 2013 (aged 81) Winsum, Netherlands
- Party: Labour

Adrianus "Adriaan" van Veldhuizen (Dutch: [ˈaːdrijaːn vɑŋ ˈvɛltɦœyzə(n)]; 4 February 1932 – 6 April 2013) was a Dutch politician of the Labour Party (PvdA). Born in Groningen, he was trained to become a Reformed minister, and he worked for a folk high school. He was on the Provincial Council of Groningen and the Uithuizen and Hefshuizen Municipal Councils before serving as a member of the Senate between September 1977 and June 1995. Van Veldhuizen died in 2013 in Winsum at the age of 81.
