= Oudeschip =

- Village
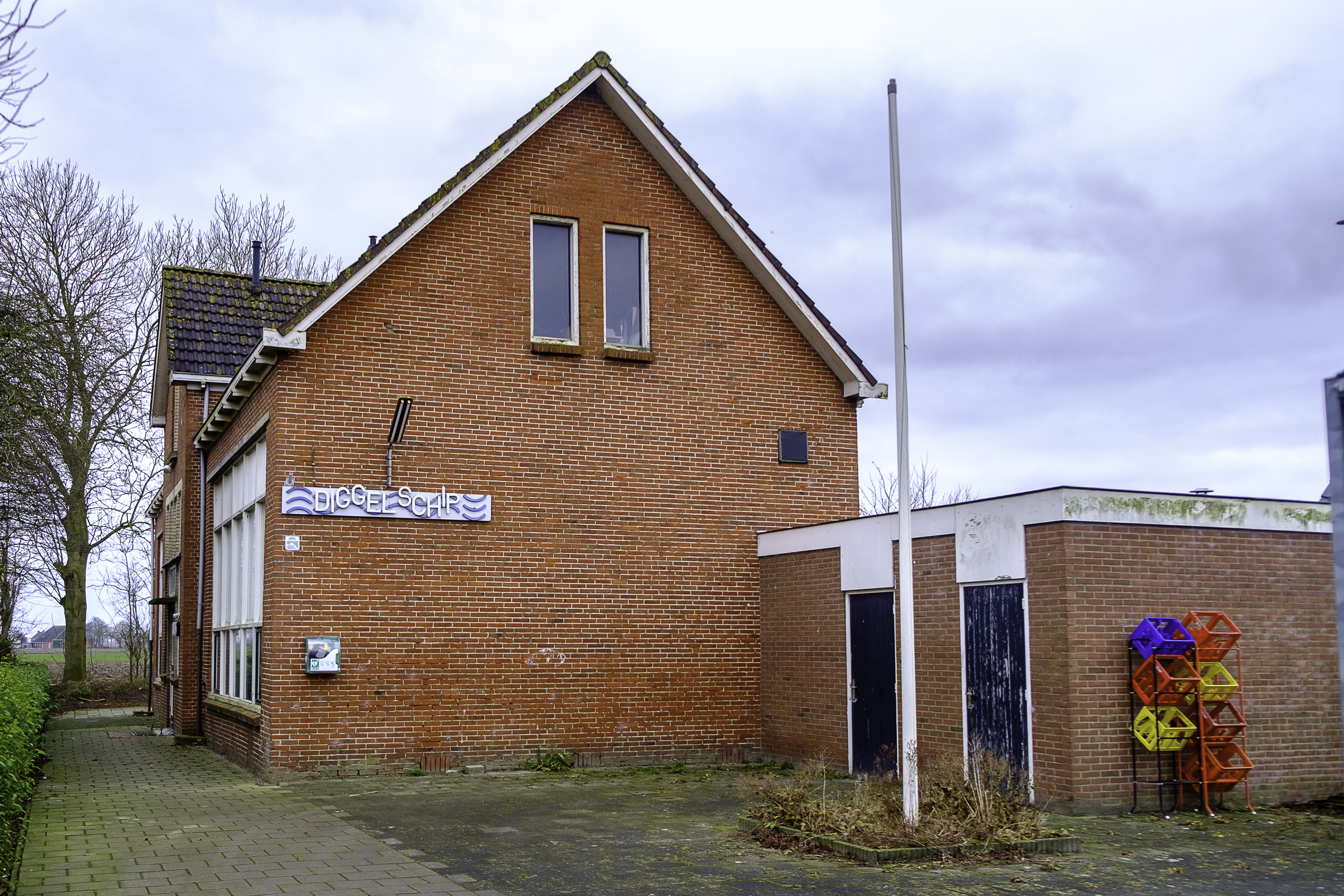
- Community house

- Location of Oudeschip in the province of Groningen Oudeschip (Netherlands)
- Coordinates: 53°26′N 6°49′E
- Country: Netherlands
- Province: Groningen
- Municipality: Het Hogeland

Area
  - Total: 0.48 km^{2} (0.19 sq mi)
- Elevation: 0.7 m (2.3 ft)

Population (2021)
  - Total: 130
  - Density: 270/km^{2} (700/sq mi)
- Time zone: UTC+1 (CET)
  - Summer (DST): UTC+2 (CEST)
- Postal code: 9984
- Dialing code: 0595

Oudeschip is a small village in Het Hogeland municipality in the Dutch province of Groningen. It had a population of around 125 in January 2017.

Oudeschip is the most northern town of the mainland of the Netherlands.

== History ==
It was part of Uithuizermeeden municipality before 1979, when it became part of Hefshuizen.

== Gallery ==
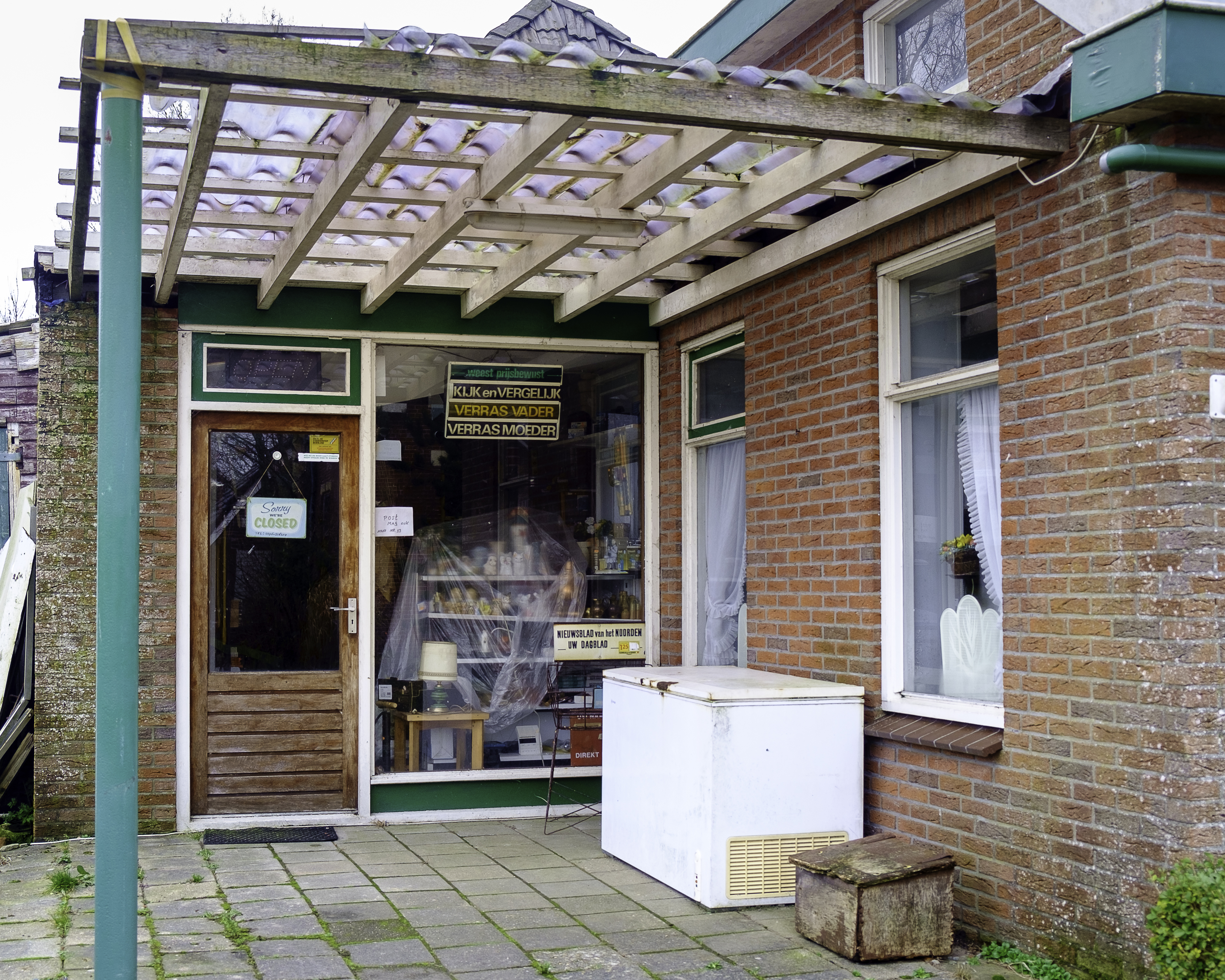
Former shop in Oudeschip

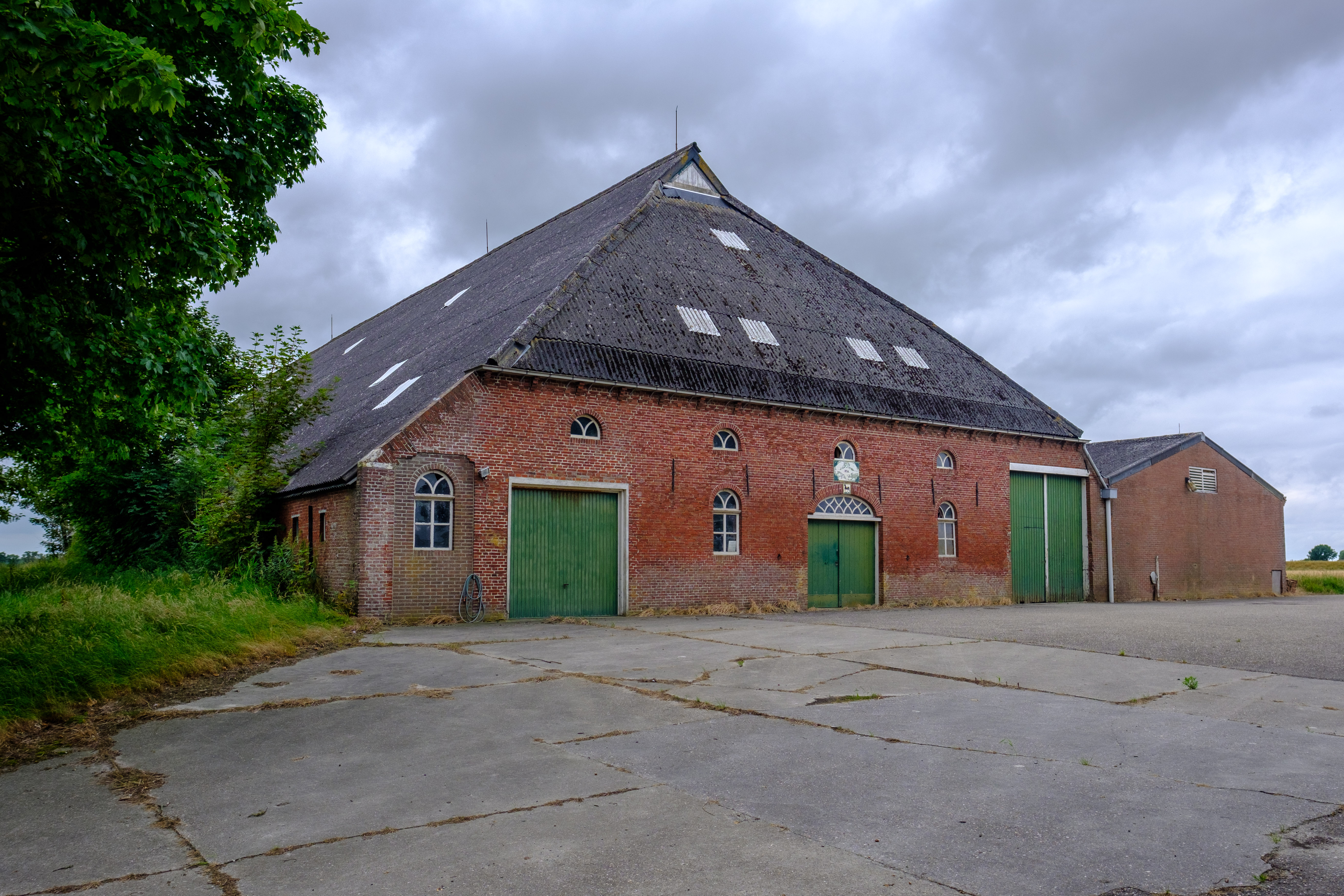
Farm in Oudeschip

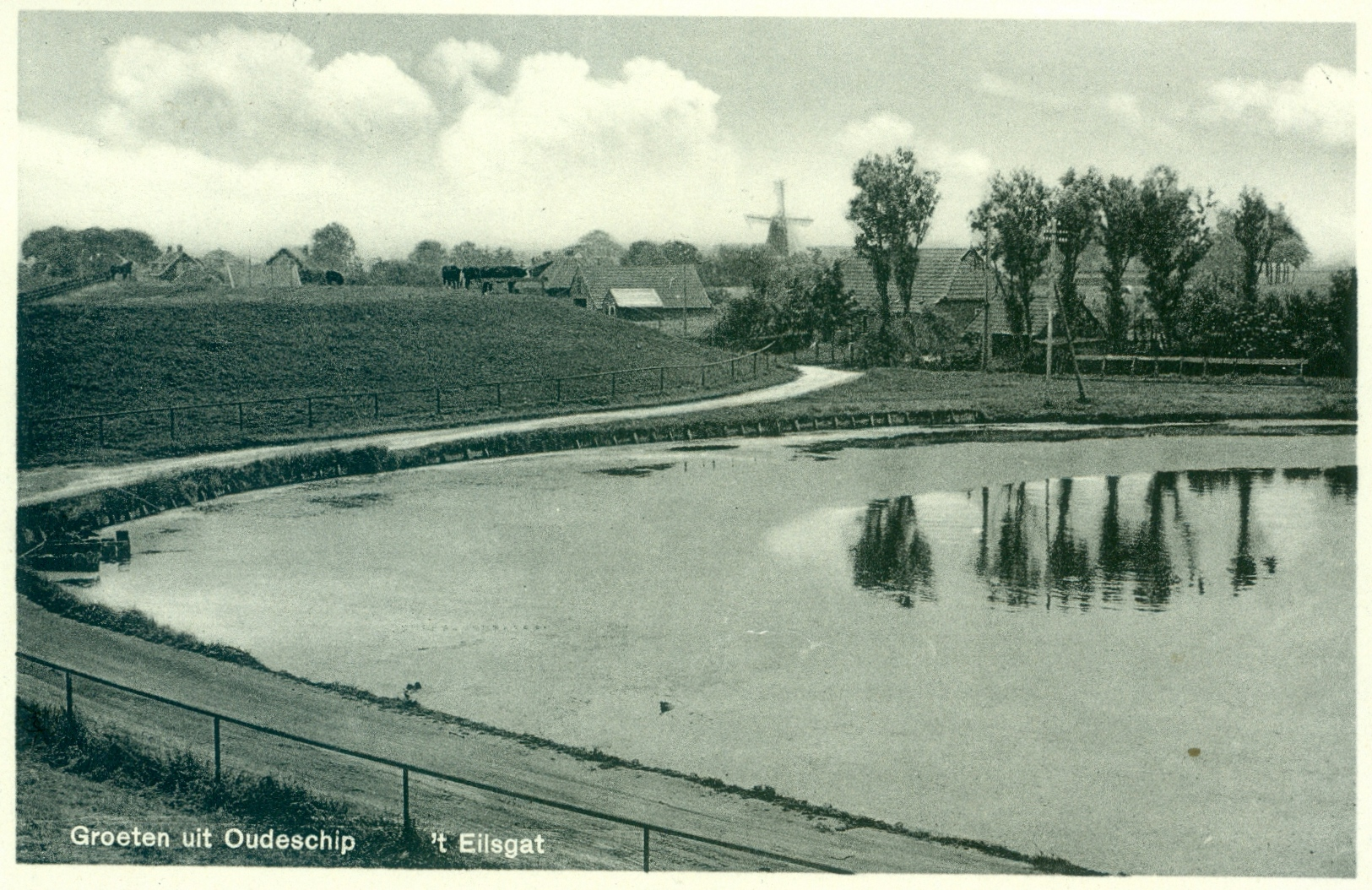
Old postcard of Oudeschip
