= Het Hogeland =

- Municipality
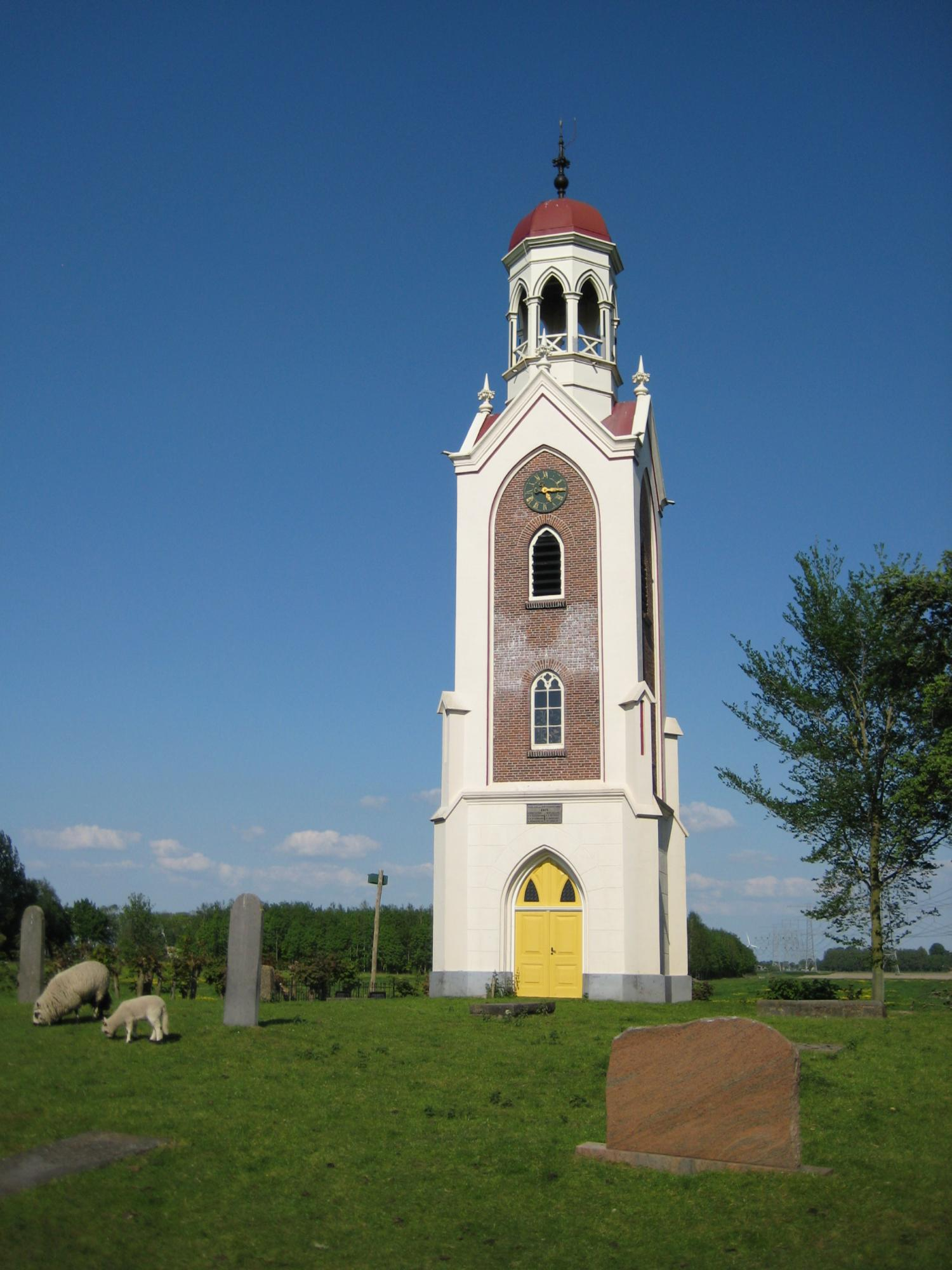
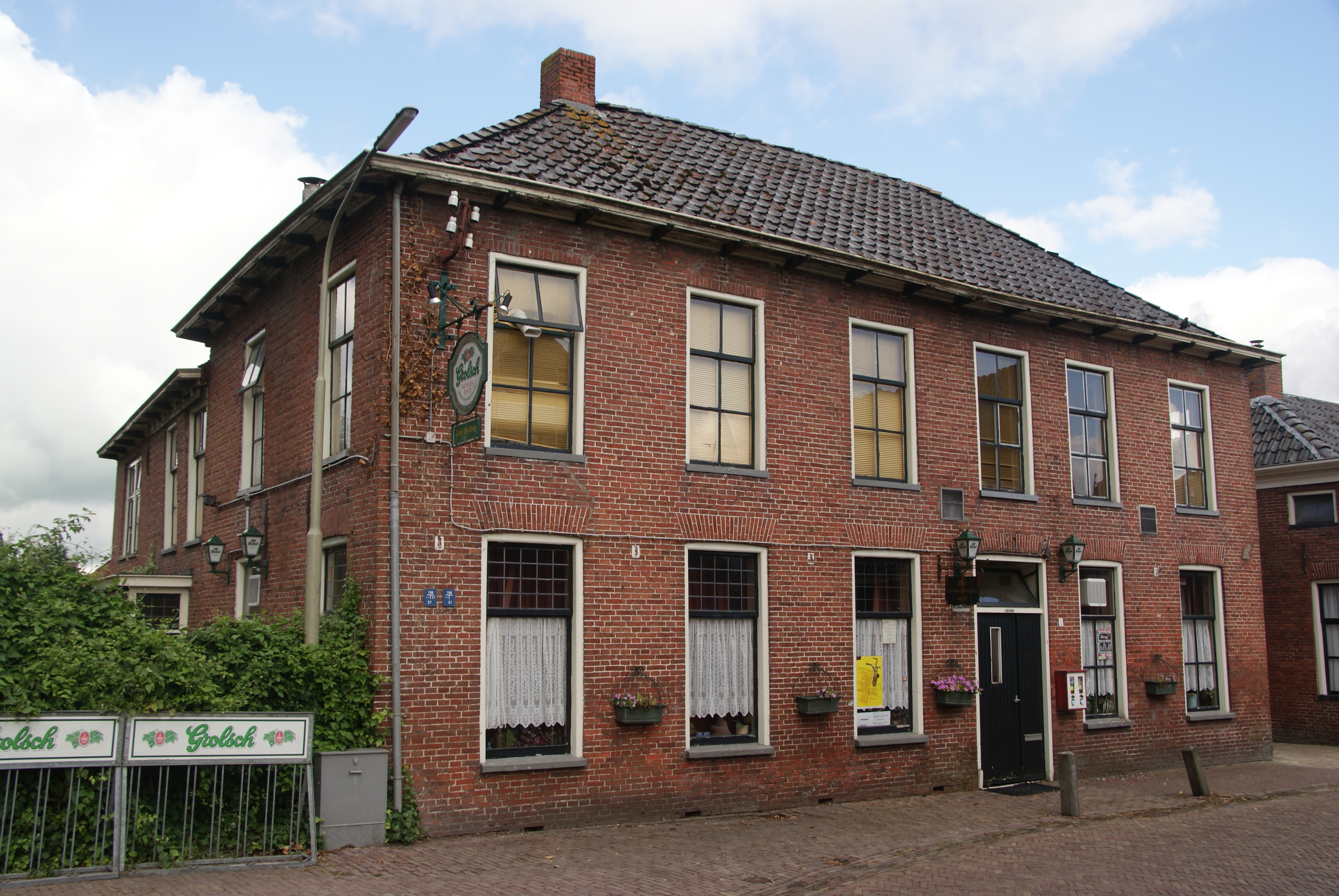
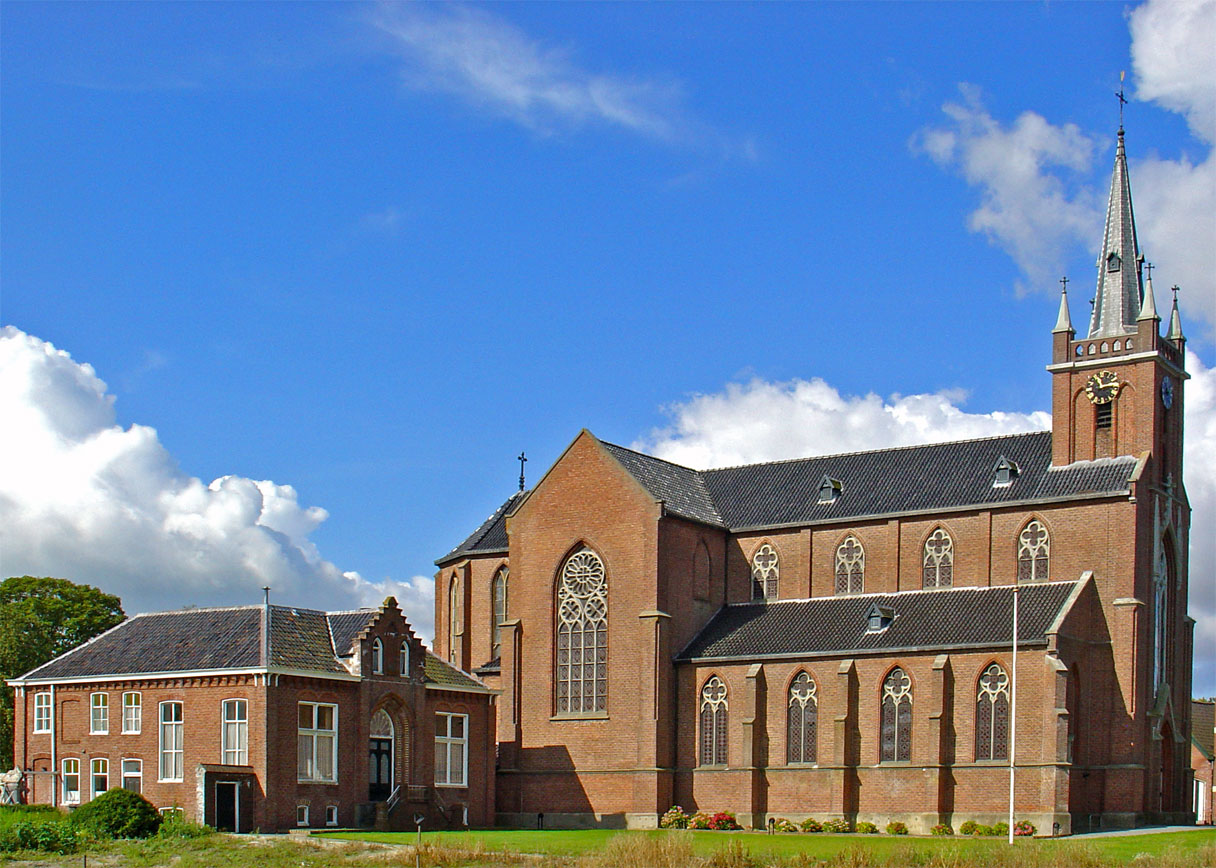
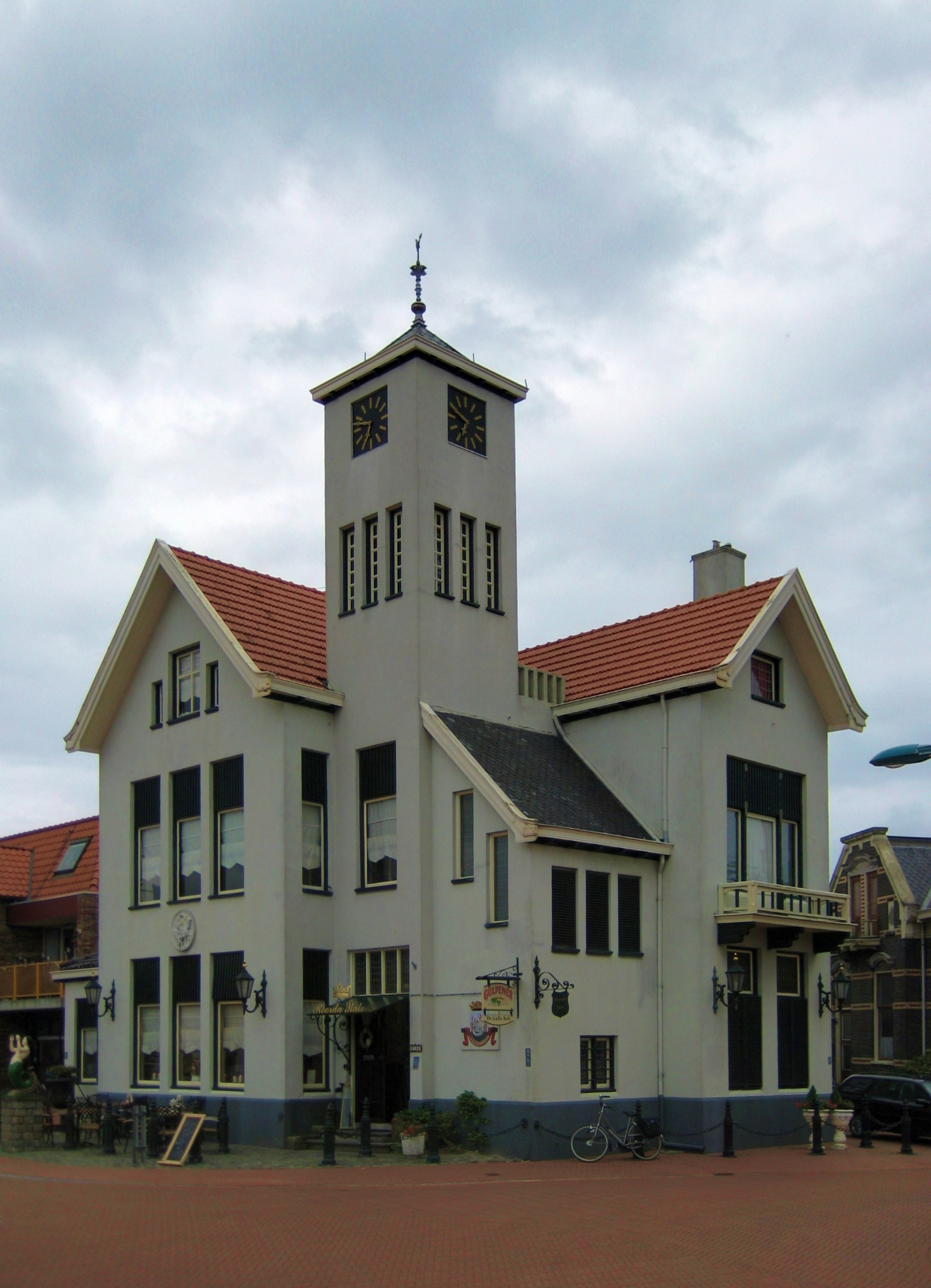
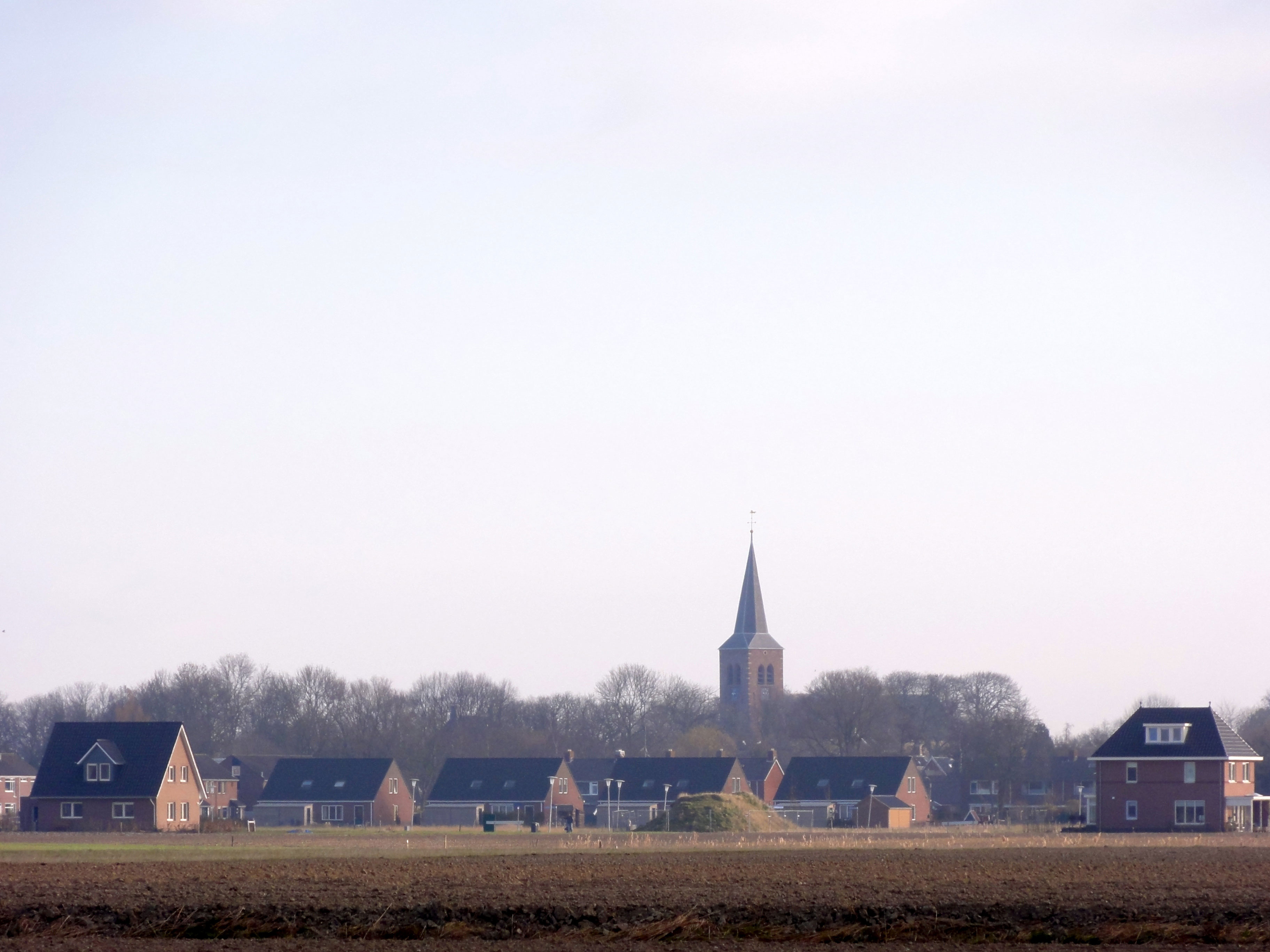
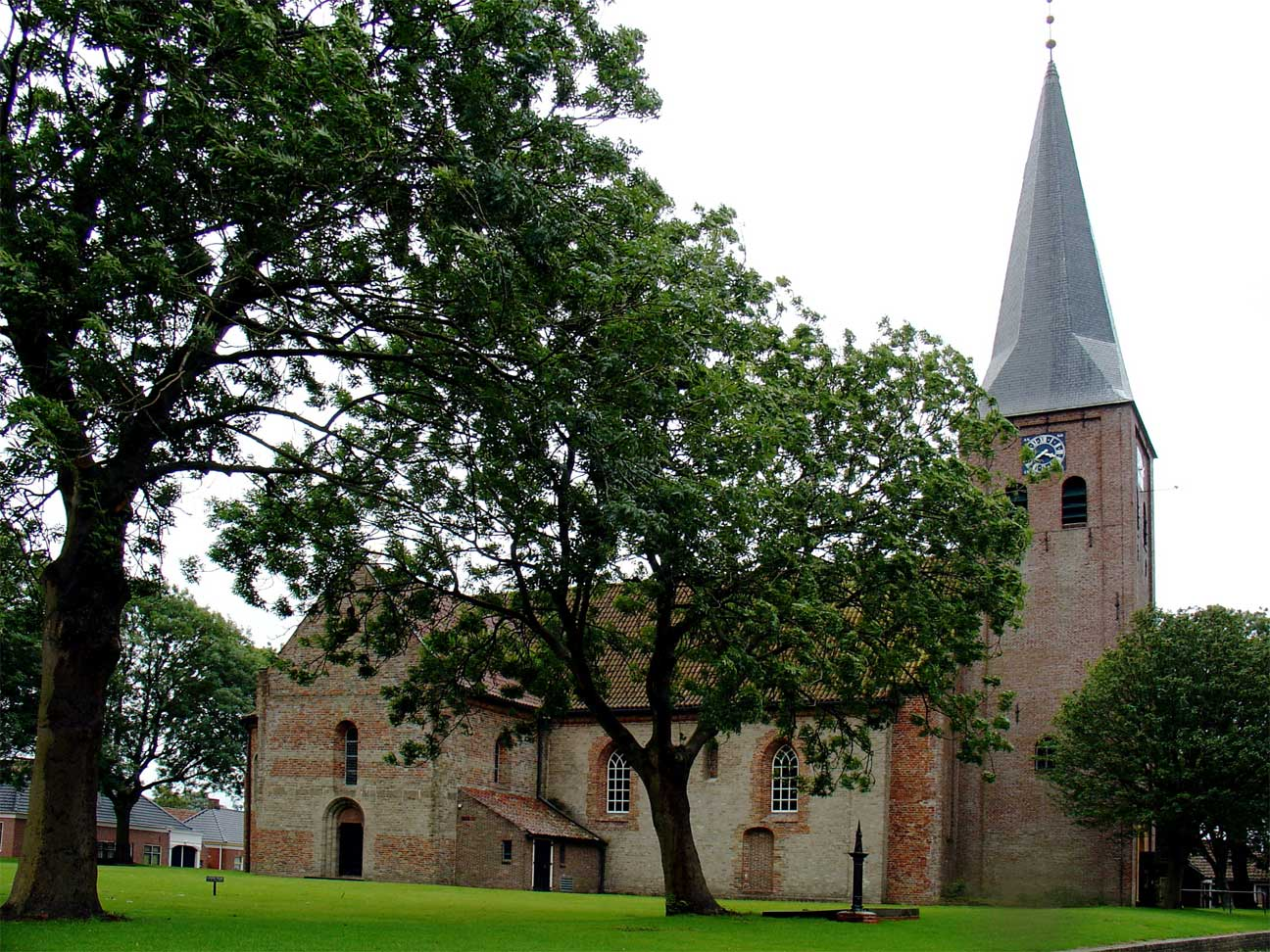
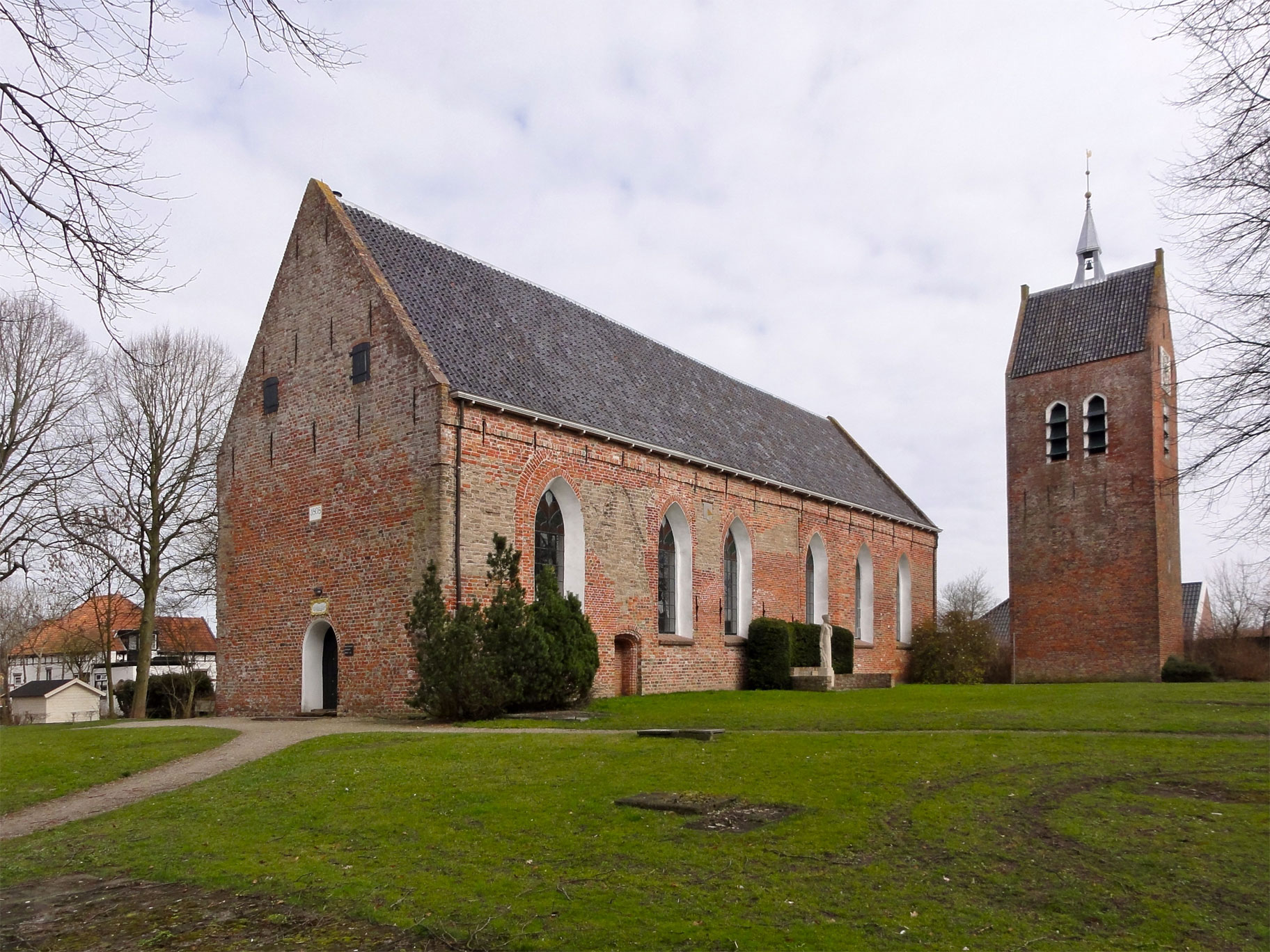
- Bedum Winsum Uithuizen Uithuizermeeden Warffum Leens Baflo

- Flag Coat of arms

- Location in Groningen
- Coordinates: 53°24′49″N 6°40′38″E
- Country: Netherlands
- Province: Groningen
- Established: 1 January 2019

Government
  - Body: Municipal council
  - Mayor: Henk Jan Bolding (CDA)

Area
  - Total: 907.63 km^{2} (350.44 sq mi)
  - Land: 485.72 km^{2} (187.54 sq mi)
  - Water: 421.91 km^{2} (162.90 sq mi)

Population (July 2019)
  - Total: 47,861
- Website: hethogeland.nl

Het Hogeland is a municipality in the north of the province of Groningen in the northeast of the Netherlands.

== History ==
The municipality of Het Hogeland was established on 1 January 2019 by merging the municipalities of Bedum, De Marne, Eemsmond and Winsum.

== Geography ==
Dutch topographic map of the municipality of Het Hogeland, April 2019

Het Hogeland is located around 53°25′N 6°41′E in the north of the province of Groningen and in the northeast of the Netherlands.

The population centers in the municipality are: Broek, Eemshaven, Eenrum, Ellerhuizen, Eppenhuizen, Hornhuizen, Houwerzijl, Kantens, Kleine Huisjes, Kloosterburen, Kruisweg, Lauwersoog, Leens, Mensingeweer, Molenrij, Niekerk, Noordwolde, Oldenzijl, Onderdendam, Oosteinde, Oosternieland, Oudeschip, Pieterburen, Roodeschool, Rottum, Schouwerzijl, Startenhuizen, Stitswerd, Uithuizen, Uithuizermeeden, Ulrum, Usquert, Vierhuizen, Warfhuizen, Warffum, Wehe-den Hoorn, Westerdijkshorn, Westernieland, Zandeweer, Zoutkamp, Zuidwolde and Zuurdijk.

== Government ==
Hans Broekhuizen of the Christian Democratic Appeal (CDA) is mayor of Het Hogeland.

== Transport ==
The Sauwerd–Roodeschool railway connects the railway stations at Warffum, Usquert, Uithuizen, Uithuizermeeden and Roodeschool to Groningen railway station and the rest of the Dutch railway network.

== Notable people ==
=== Public thinking & public service ===
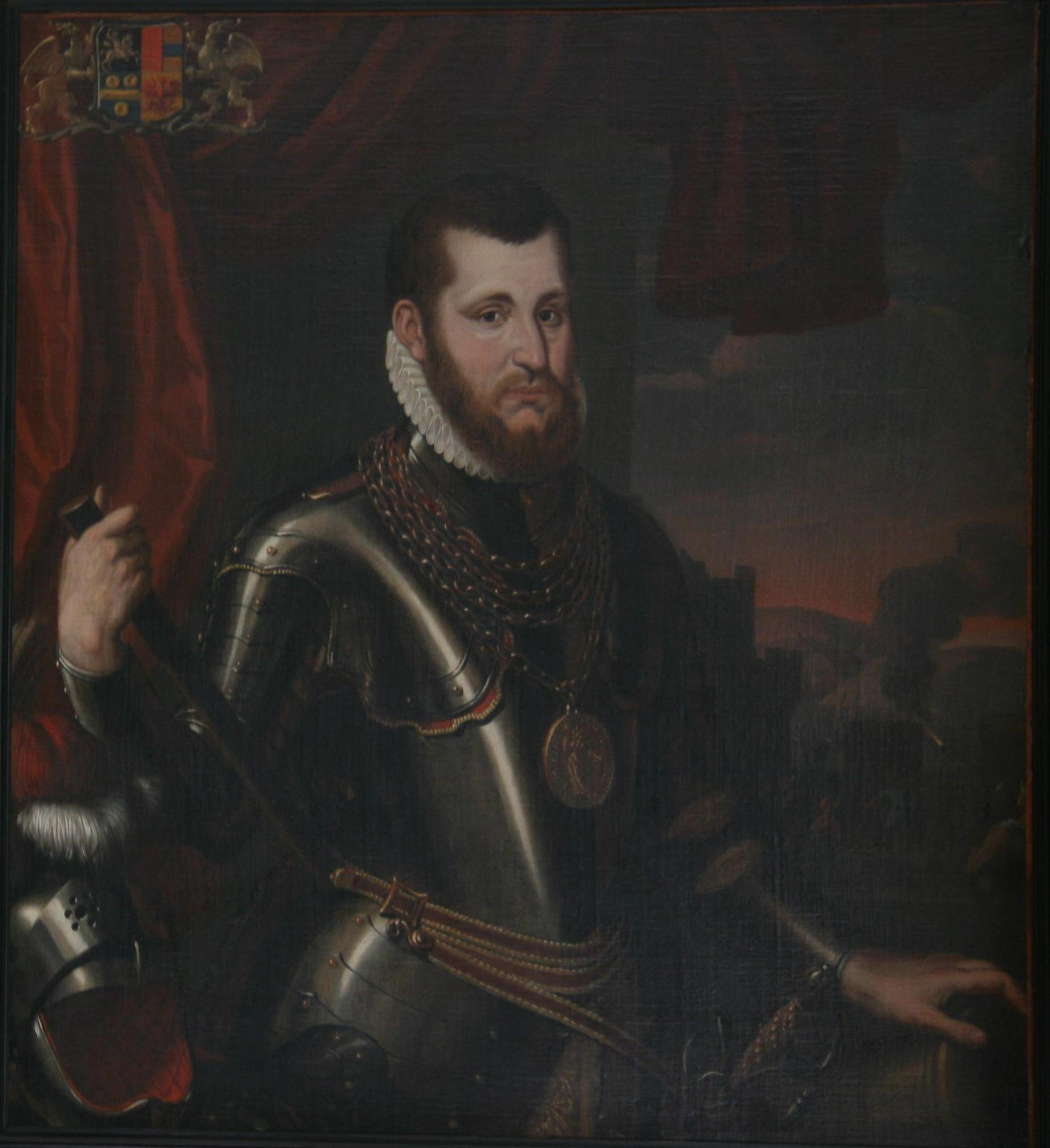
Wigbolt Ripperda

- Rodolphus Agricola (c. 1443 in Baflo – 1485) pre-Erasmian humanist, Hebrew scholar, educator, musician and builder of a church organ
- Wigbolt, Baron Ripperda (c. 1535 in Winsum – 1573) city governor of Haarlem when the city was under siege in the Eighty Years' War
- Willem Surenhuis (c. 1664 in Rottum – 1729) Dutch Christian scholar of Hebrew
- Hendrik Bulthuis (1865 in Warffum – 1945) Dutch customs official, author and translator of more than thirty works into Esperanto
- Gezina van der Molen (1892 in Baflo – 1978) legal scholar and resistance fighter during WWII
- Cornelis Simon Meijer (1904 in Pieterburen – 1974) Dutch mathematician and academic
- Sicco Mansholt (1908 in Ulrum – 1995) Dutch politician and diplomat
- Aldert van der Ziel (1910 in Zandeweer – 1991) Dutch physicist who studied electronic noise processes
- Molly Geertsema (1918–1991) politician and jurist, mayor of Warffum 1953–1957
- Martin Zijlstra (1944 in Eenrum – 2014) Dutch politician
- Gert Hekma (born 1951 in Bedum - 2022) Dutch anthropologist, sociologist and academic
- Klaas Knot (born 1967 in Bedum) Dutch economist, president of the Dutch central bank De Nederlandsche Bank

=== The arts ===
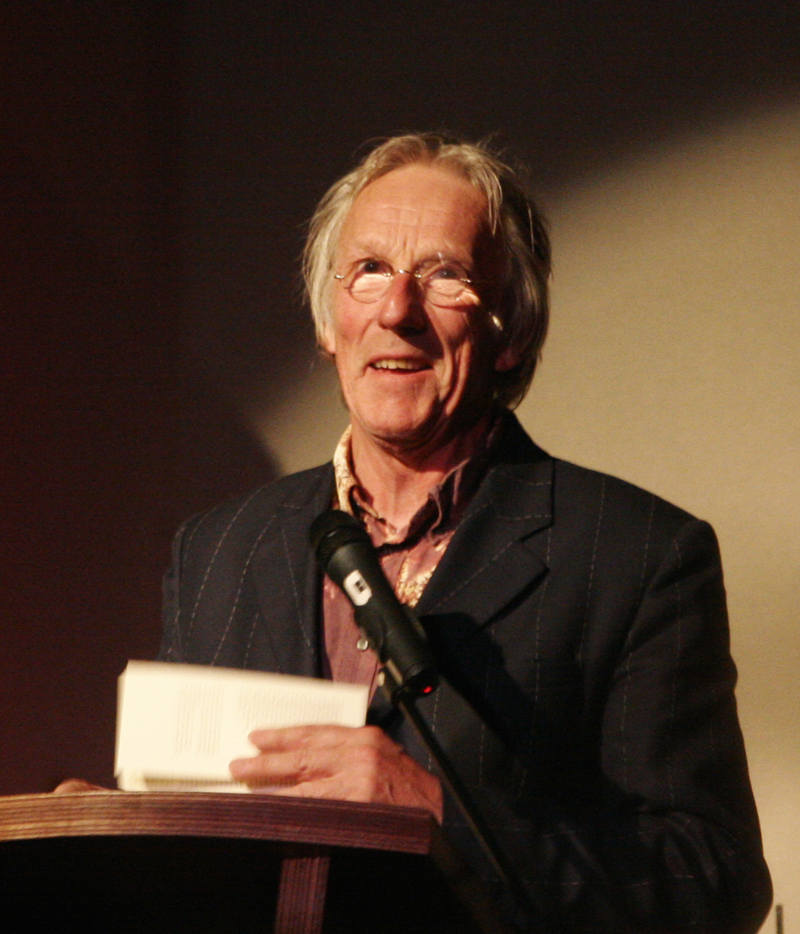
Freek de Jonge, 2010

- Hermanus Numan (1744 in Ezinge – 1820) painter, draftsman, pastellist, etcher, engraver, watercolorist, art theorist and publisher
- Hendrik Nicolaas Werkman (1882 in Leens – 1945) experimental Dutch artist, typographer and printer
- Frits Peutz (1896 in Uithuizen – 1974) architect
- Seth Gaaikema (1939 in Uithuizen – 2014) cabaret artist, writer, and lyricist
- Ede Staal (1941 in Warffum – 1986) Dutch singer-songwriter, sang mainly in Gronings dialect
- Freek de Jonge (born 1944 in Westernieland) Dutch cabaret performer and writer

=== Sport ===
- Arjen Robben (born 1984 in Bedum) professional footballer for FC Bayern Munich and the Netherlands national football team with 420 and 96 caps respectively
- Ranomi Kromowidjojo (born 1990 in Sauwerd) Dutch swimmer, triple Olympic champion
- Yuri Solinger (born 1979 in Vierhuizen) Dutch speed skater
