= Sietje Gravendaal-Tammens =

Dutch resistance leader (1914–2014)

- Born: Sietje Tammens; 29 July 1914; Kloosterburen, Netherlands
- Died: 27 September 2014 (aged 100); Winsum, Netherlands
- Other names: Martha Oosterveen
- Occupations: resistance leader, teacher

Sietje Gravendeel-Tammens (29 July 1914 – 27 September 2014) was a Dutch resistance leader and teacher. In 1944, she was sentenced to death, but survived because the sentence needed approval from Berlin.

== Biography ==
Sietje Tammens was born on a farm near Kloosterburen as the oldest of eight children. At first she wanted to become a Dutch Reformed pastor despite not being raised religiously. Ultimately she chose to study at a training college to become a teacher. In 1939, she left for Groningen as a private teacher for a mentally handicapped son of a professor. During this period, she specialized in speech-language pathology.

== World War II ==
In late 1941, Tammens became a teacher at a BLO school, special education for boys with learning difficulties. She found refuge for a Jewish boy from her school and his brother at a farm, which marked her first act of resistance. Her activities increased, and soon her house was used as a temporary shelter for refugees, and storage for stolen ration stamp and arms. In the summer of 1943, her house became the meeting place for the Groninger Top, the heads of the provincial resistance group. The Top consisted of five people of which Tammens was the sole female member, and had to vote on liquidations and armed actions. Her authority was never questioned, and she played a decisive role in determining reliability.

On 14 July 1943, Tammens organized the raid on a ration stamp distribution centre in Langweer. On 31 December 1943 the police chief Anne Elsinga was killed because he had discovered that Trouw was printed in Bedum. His successor Jannes Keijer was killed four months later by the group. The executions resulted in the Silbertanne Represailles. In the early morning of 25 April 1944 about 1,000 soldiers and SD surrounded the villages of Zuidwolde, Bedum, Stedum, Winsum, and Middelstum. Six men were shot, and 148 were sent to Nazi concentration camps, where 22 died.

An attempted execution of Klaas Prenger, a NSB (Dutch nazi party) colleague at her school, failed. He was shot, but survived. Tammens had to flee. She first found refuge in Harlingen, and later in Leeuwarden. Using the false name Martha Oosterveen, she nevertheless continued with her resistance work.

== Arrest ==
On 13 June 1944, Tammens and others were caught in a trap at the Identity Cards Office in Amsterdam, and were arrested. She was sent to Herzogenbusch concentration camp in Vught, transferred to the Oranjehotel in Scheveningen and returned to Herzogenbusch. The Sicherheitsdienst (SD) discovered her true identity, and she was transferred to the Scholtenhuis in Groningen which was the local headquarters of the SD.

Untersturmführer Ernst Knorr sentenced her to death in August 1944, however in case of Germanic women a confirmation from Berlin was needed before the sentence could be carried out. Dolle Dinsdag (Mad Tuesday), a rumour that Breda had been liberated, caused a massive panic among the Germans, and resulted in a transfer to a work camp on the island of Borkum on 8 September 1944. In late March 1945, she bribed a soldier and managed to escape the camp and island. Later she was arrested in Emden, and taken to Camp Aurich, a subcamp of the Neuengamme concentration camp, where she was liberated by the Canadian Army.

== After the war ==
Tammens survived, but was unable to bear children after sexual abuse by a German guard in Borkum. In 1947, she left for Curaçao as director of a school for special education. During her stay in Curaçao, she met Cees Gravendaal. In 1964, Tammens retired to the Netherlands, and in 1979 married Cees Gravendaal. In 2000, the Resistance Museum in Groningen persuaded her to document her experiences. Sietje Tammens died on 27 September 2014 in Winsum aged 100. She donated her body to science.
