= Houwerzijl =

- Village
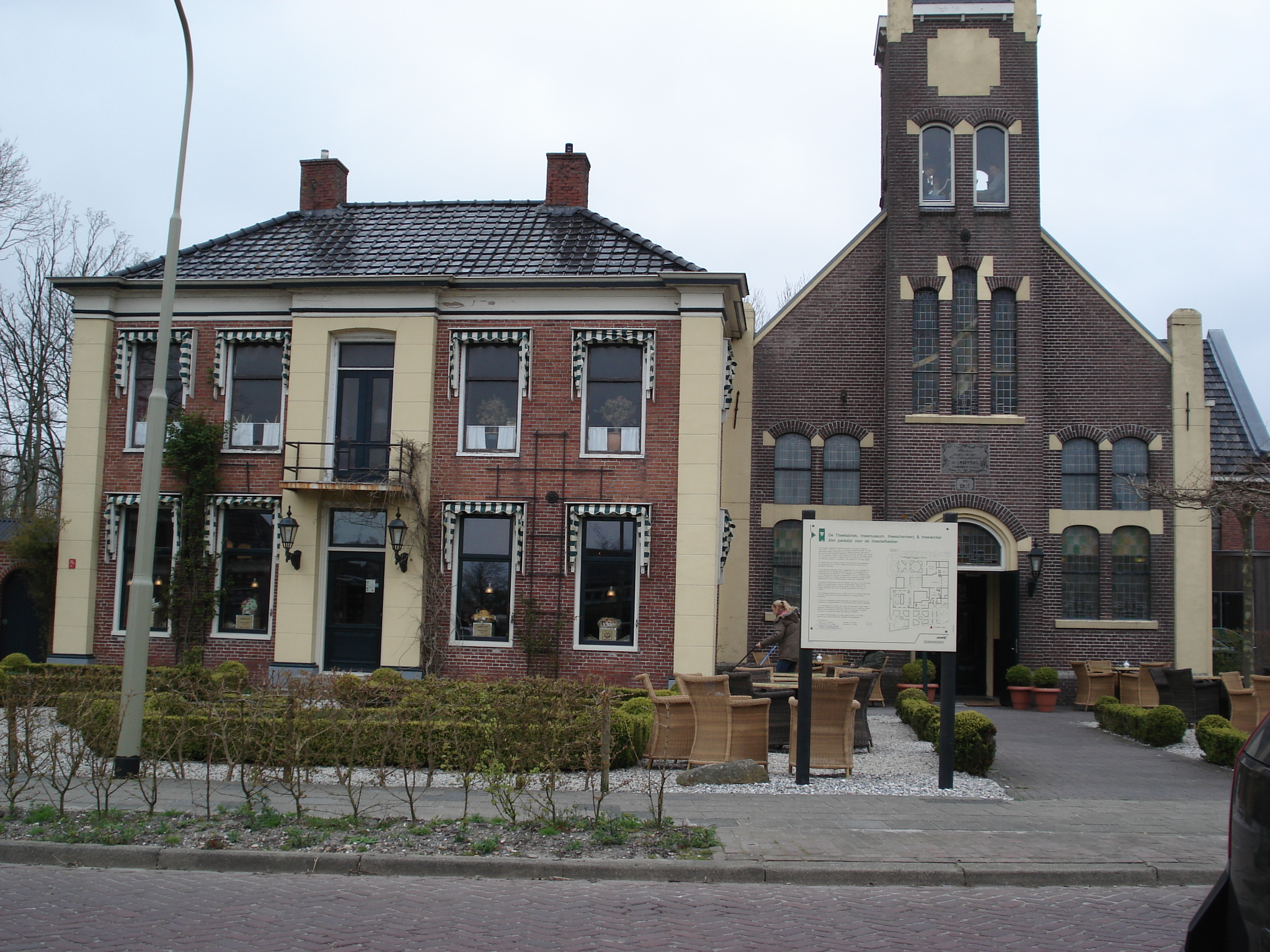
- Theefabriek, a tea museum in Houwerzijl.

- Location of Houwerzijl in the province of Groningen Houwerzijl (Netherlands)
- Coordinates: 53.33594°N 6.34144°E
- Country: Netherlands
- Province: Groningen
- Municipality: Het Hogeland

Area
  - Total: 0.34 km^{2} (0.13 sq mi)
- Elevation: 2 m (6.6 ft)

Population (2021)
  - Total: 175
  - Density: 510/km^{2} (1,300/sq mi)
- Time zone: UTC+1 (CET)
  - Summer (DST): UTC+2 (CEST)
- Postal code: 9973
- Dialing code: 0595

Houwerzijl (Dutch pronunciation: [ˌɦʌu.ərˈzɛil]; Gronings: Haauwerziel [ɦaːu̯əɾˈzil]) is a small village in the Netherlands; it is located in the municipality of Het Hogeland, Groningen.

Houwerzijl was located on the edge of land and water. Three terps (artificial hills) were built south of the current village, and were one of the oldest in Groningen. The hills contained fertile soil, and large parts have been excavated, and only fragments remain.

It was first mentioned in 1347 as Fredericus de Howersyle. The name means the lock (zijl) of the estate (Houw) of Fredericus. The lock was demolished in 1728, because it was no longer needed, and only the house of the operator remains.

The Theefabriek is a tea museum and tearoom in the village.

== Gallery ==
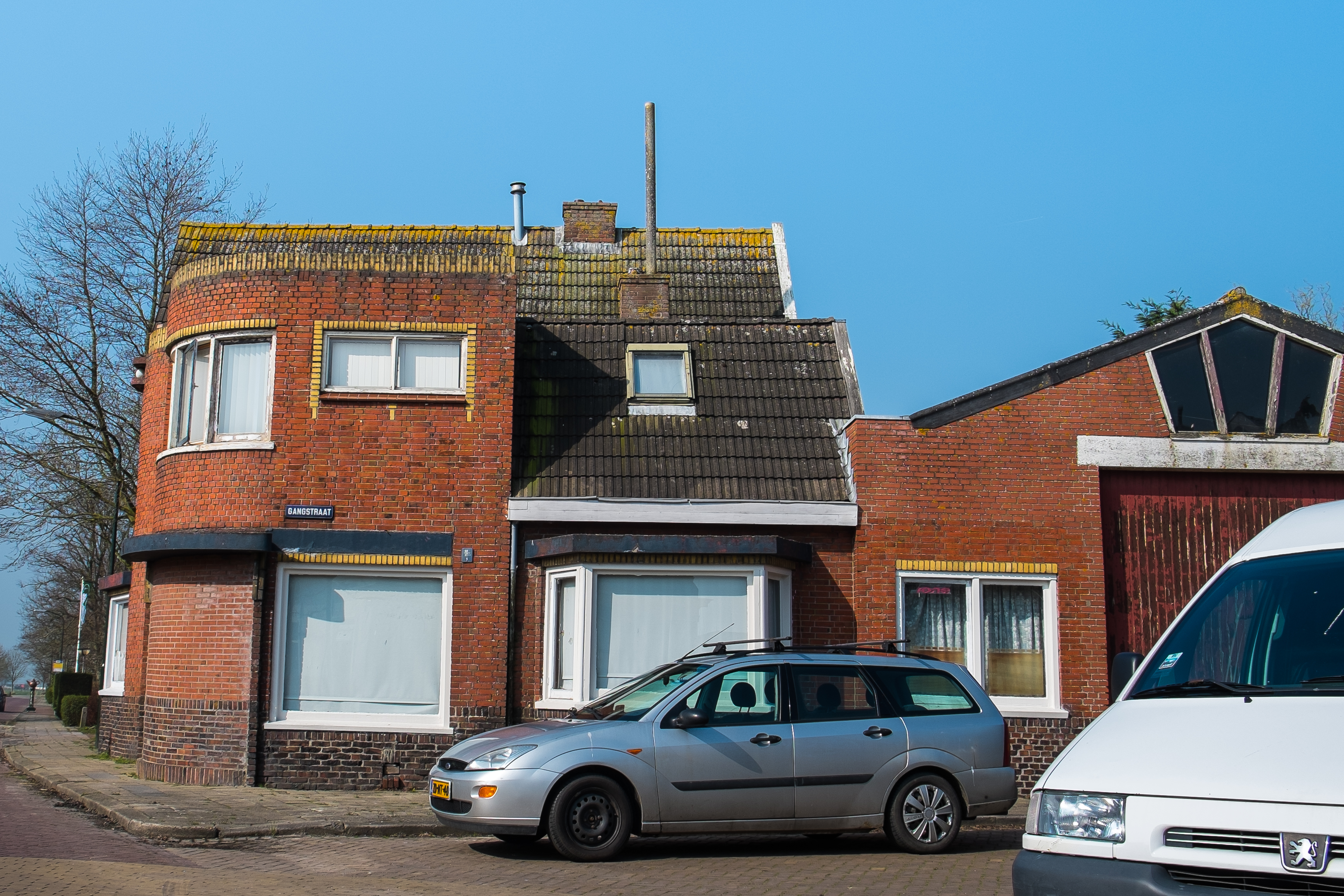
Village street

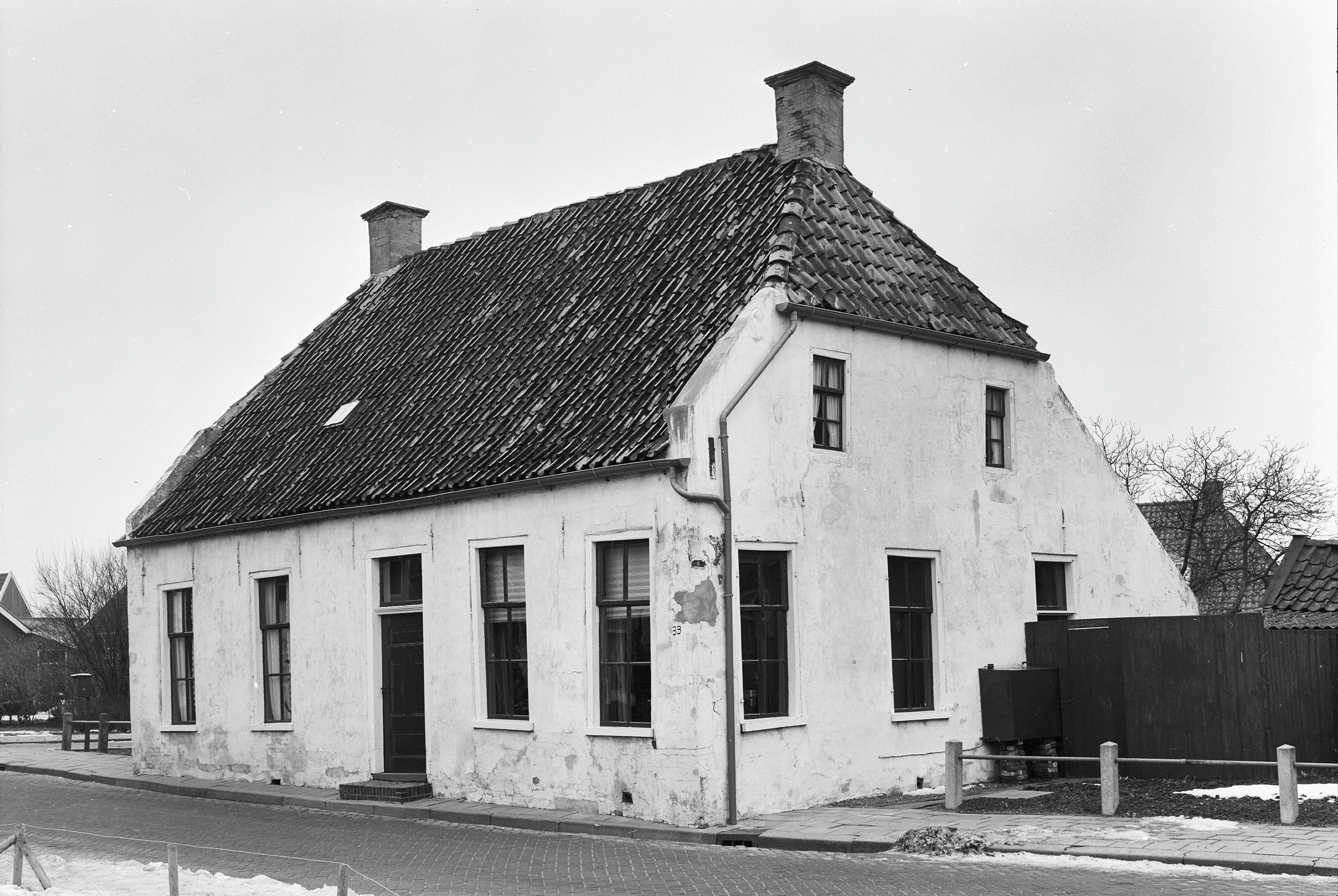
House (1975)

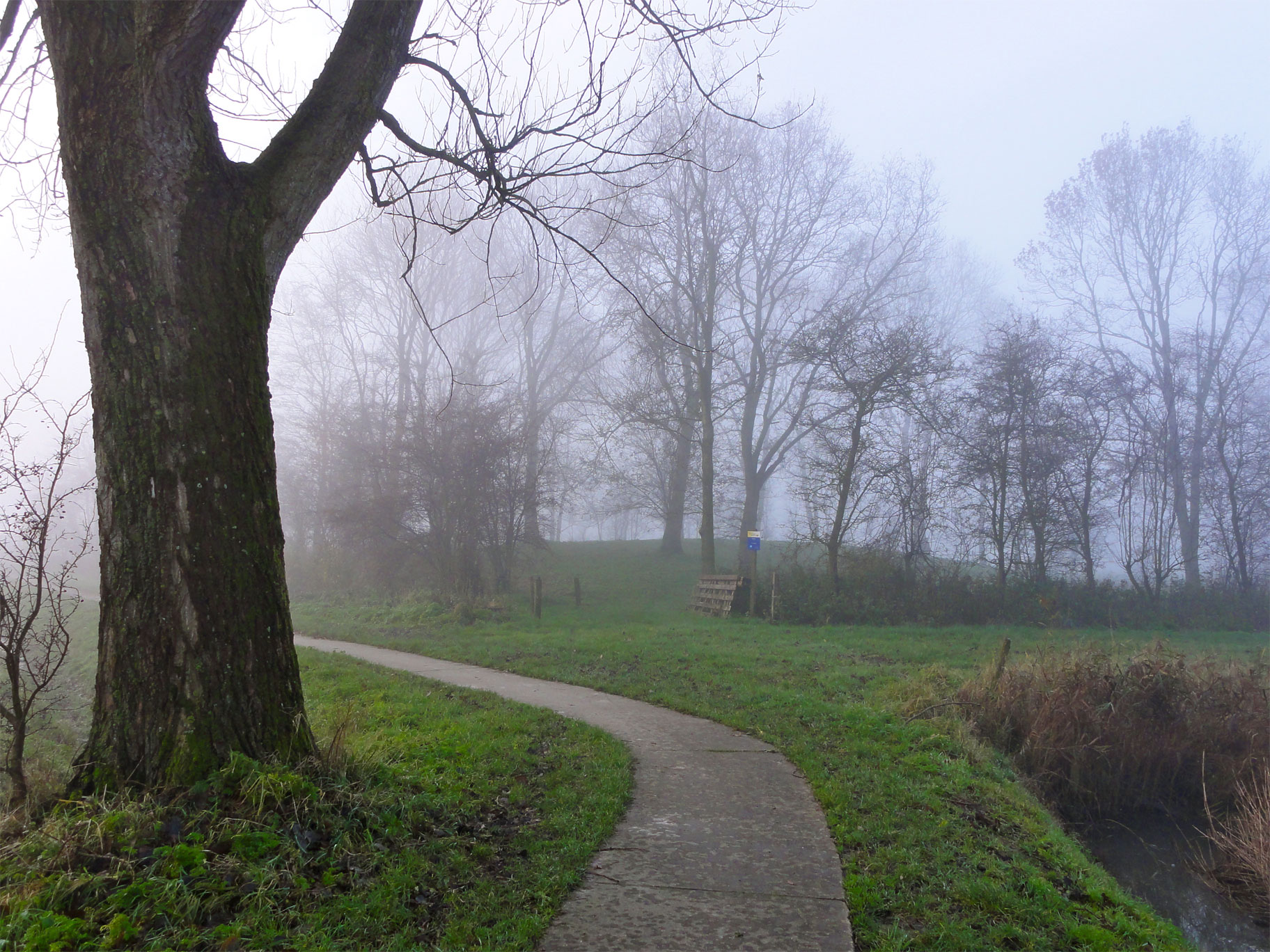
Cemetery on a terp
