= Kloosterburen =

- Village
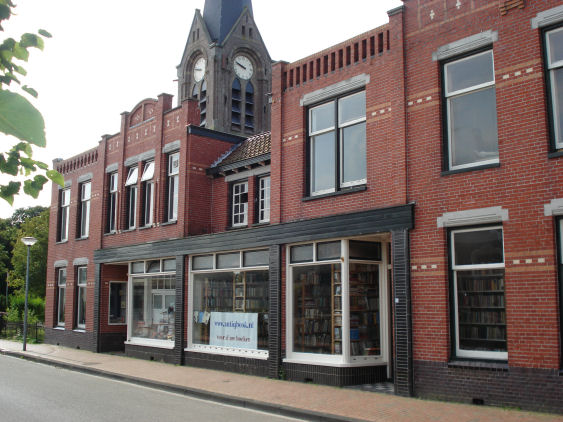
- Village library

- Flag Coat of arms

- Location of Kloosterburen in Groningen Kloosterburen (Netherlands)
- Coordinates: 53°23′10″N 6°23′26″E
- Country: Netherlands
- Province: Groningen
- Municipality: Het Hogeland
- Established: c. 1175

Area
  - Total: 32.24 km^{2} (12.45 sq mi)
- Elevation: 1 m (3.3 ft)

Population (2021)
  - Total: 1,430
  - Density: 44.4/km^{2} (115/sq mi)
- Postal code: 9977
- Dialing code: 0595

Kloosterburen is a village in the Dutch province of Groningen. It is located in the municipality of Het Hogeland. The village developed around a monastery. Kloosterburen was a separate municipality until 1990, when it was merged with Leens, Ulrum and Eenrum. During the combining of the four municipalities they were called 'de LEUK gemeenten'. In 2019, it became part of Het Hogeland.

== History ==
Around 1175, a monastery was established by Taco, a Premonstratensian from Mariëngaarde. In 1204, the monastery was named Oldeklooster after Nijeklooster, a convent was established at a distance of 15 minutes by foot. A village developed around Oldeklooster which was named Kloosterburen. At the end of the 16th century, Nijeklooster was destroyed by the Protestants. Oldeklooster was closed, and the church became Dutch Reformed, however Oldeklooster is one of the two monasteries which still exist in Groningen.

A large part of the population remained Roman Catholic, and in 1840 permission was given to re-establish a parish. The neo-gothic Saint Willibrord Church was built in 1868–69 by Pierre Cuypers. The church has a 56 metres (184 ft) tall tower. Kloosterburen is the most northern place in the Netherlands to celebrate Carnival as Kronkeldörp. From 1926 to 1970, the Roosendaal brothers of the Sacred Heart lived and worked in a Kloosterburen convent, which was converted into Hotel Het Klooster in 1970.

In 2011, the public library closed down. The village community bought the inventory, and operates a free of charge village library. Kloosterburen was an independent municipality until 1990, when it merged into De Marne. In 2019, it became part of Het Hogeland.

== Notable people ==
- Sietje Gravendaal-Tammens (1914-2014), Dutch resistance leader.

== Gallery ==
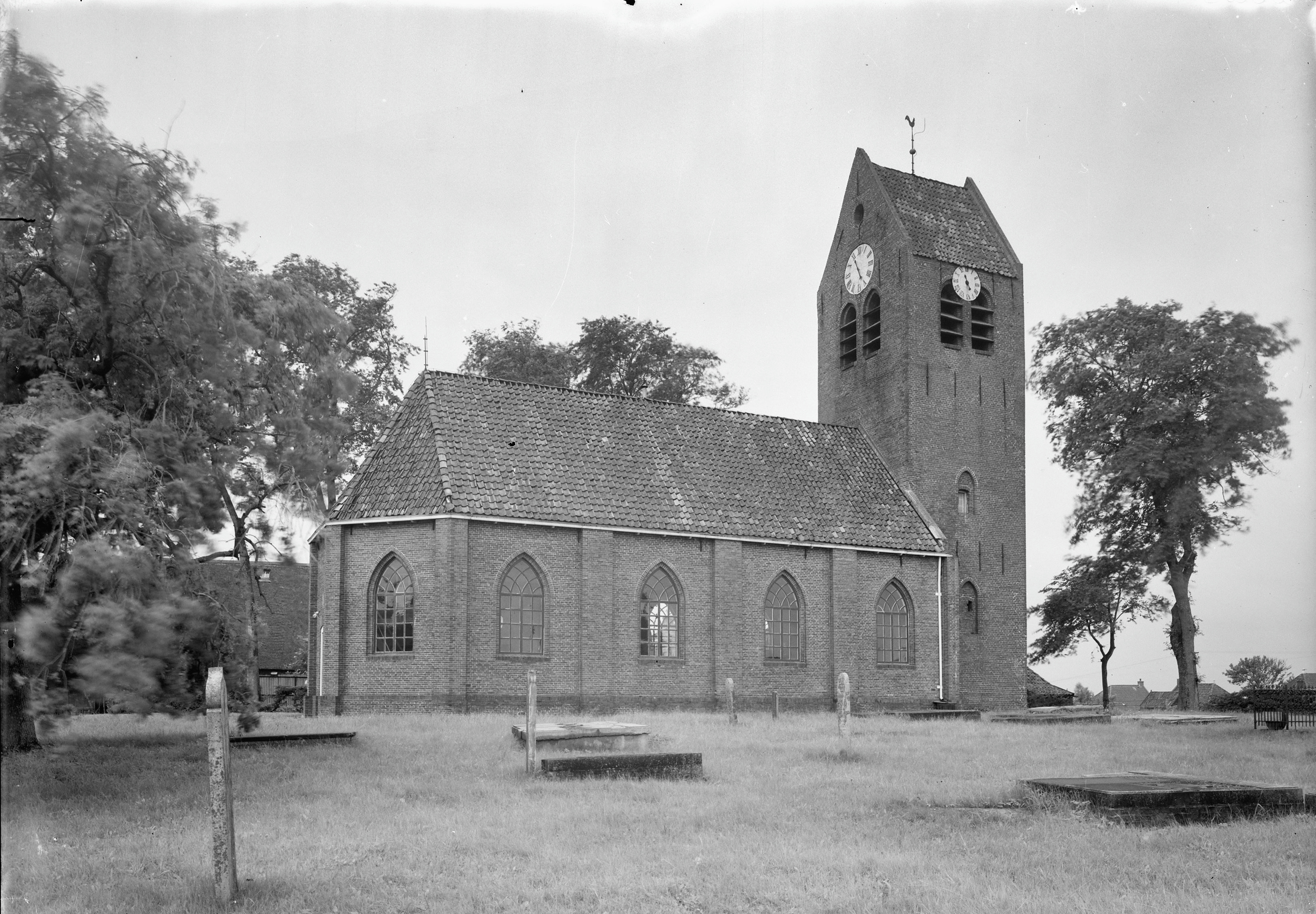
Protestant Church in 1942

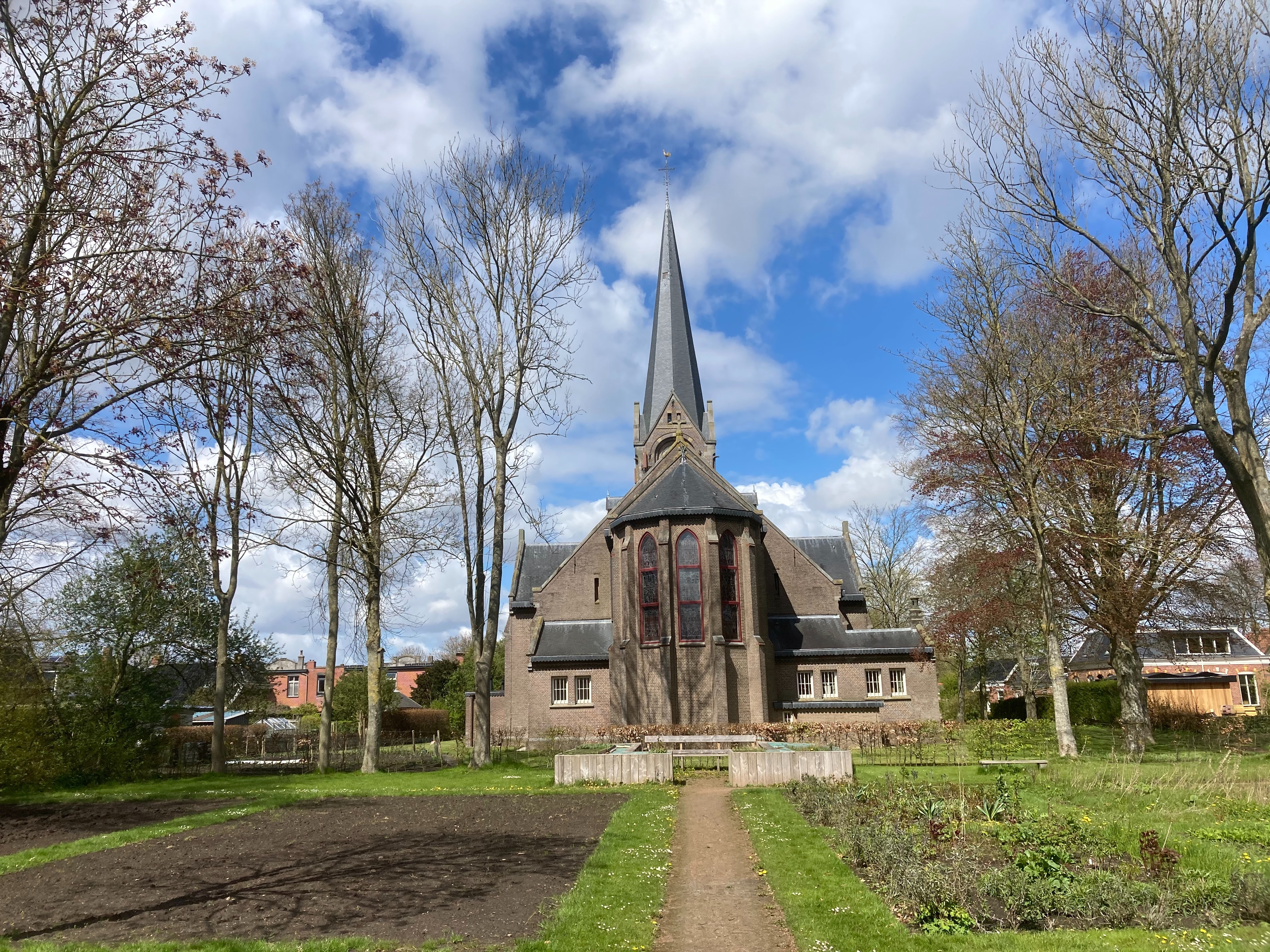
Monastery garden

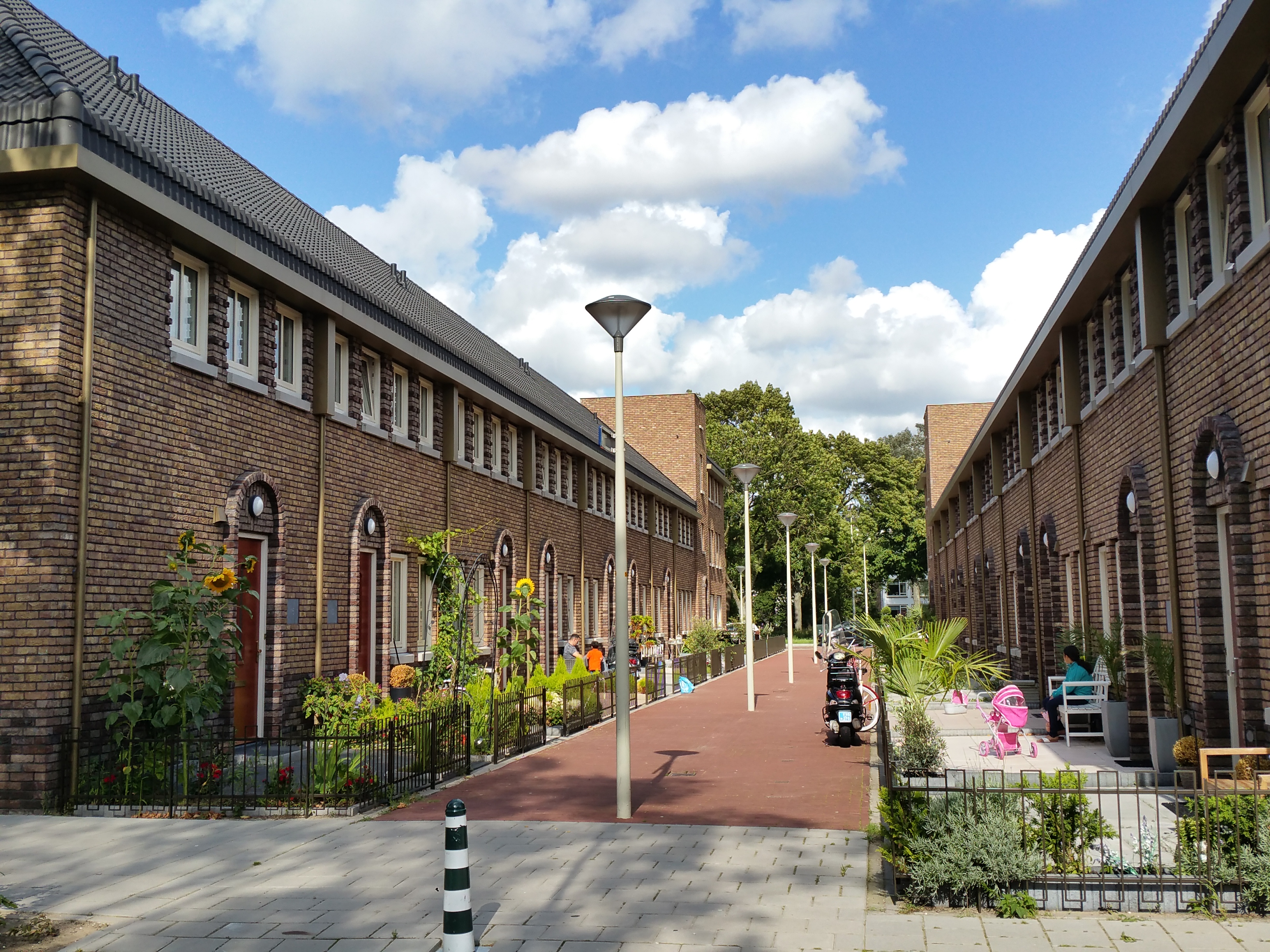
Village street

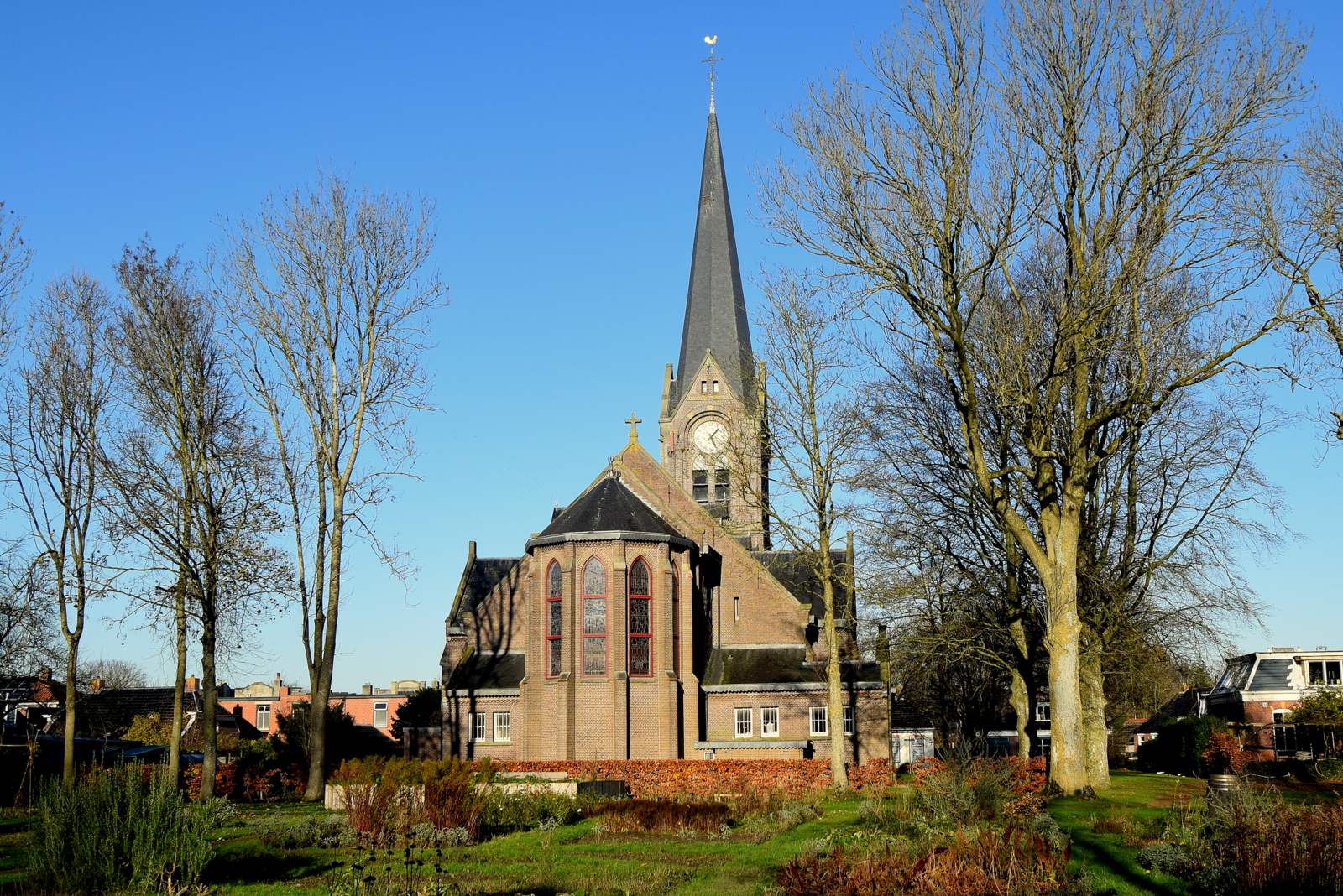
Saint Willibrord Church
