= Kantens =

- Village
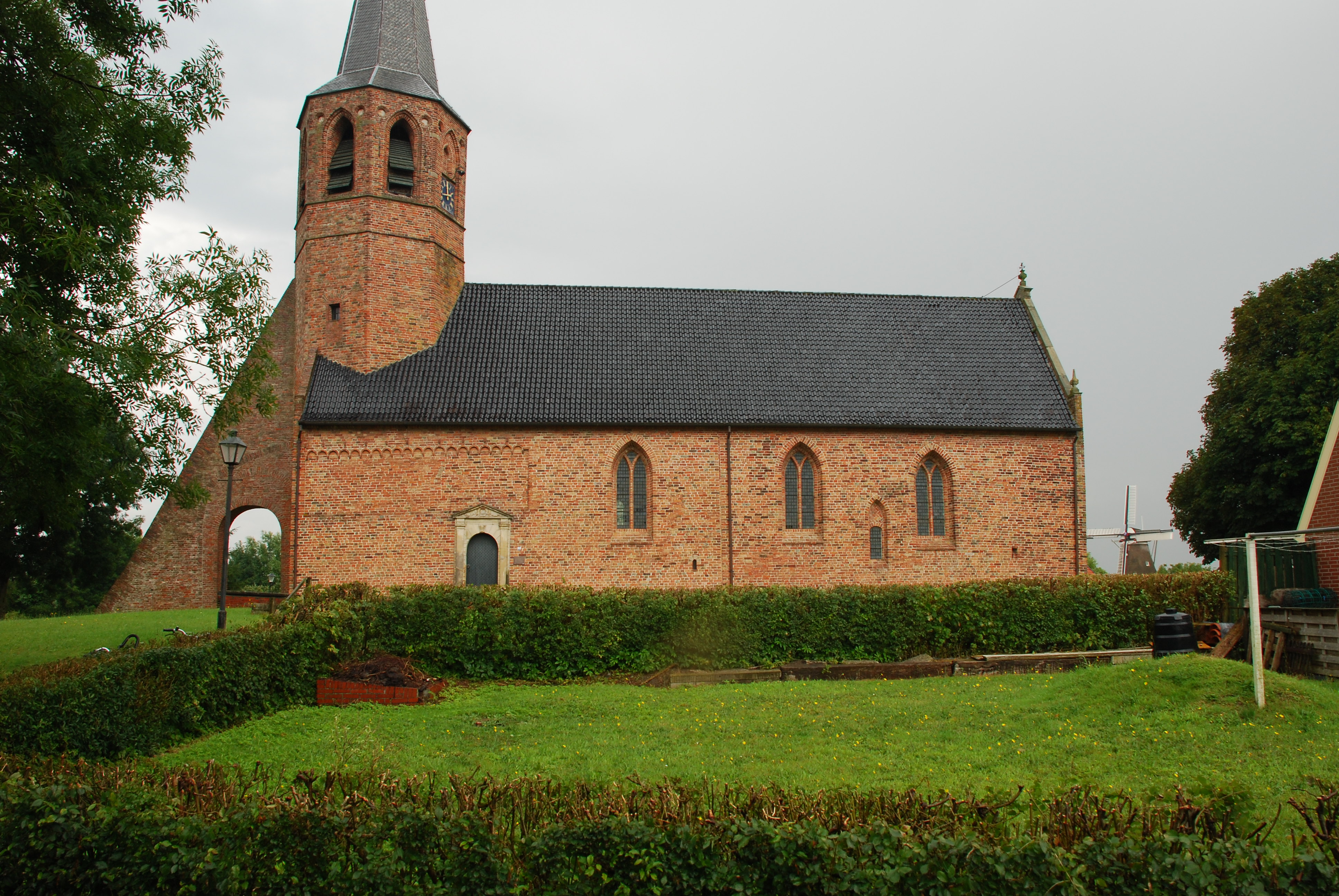
- The church of Kantens

- Coat of arms

- Location of Kantens in the province of Groningen Kantens (Netherlands)
- Coordinates: 53°21′56″N 6°38′2″E
- Country: Netherlands
- Province: Groningen
- Municipality: Het Hogeland

Area
  - Total: 31.54 km^{2} (12.18 sq mi)
- Elevation: 0.3 m (0.98 ft)

Population (2021)
  - Total: 955
  - Density: 30.3/km^{2} (78.4/sq mi)
- Time zone: UTC+1 (CET)
  - Summer (DST): UTC+2 (CEST)
- Postal code: 9995
- Dialing code: 0595

Kantens is a village in the Dutch province of Groningen. It is located in the municipality of Het Hogeland, about 16 km north of the city of Groningen. It had a population of around 965 including the surrounding area in January 2017.

Kantens was a separate municipality until 1990, when it became a part of Hefshuizen.

== Gallery ==
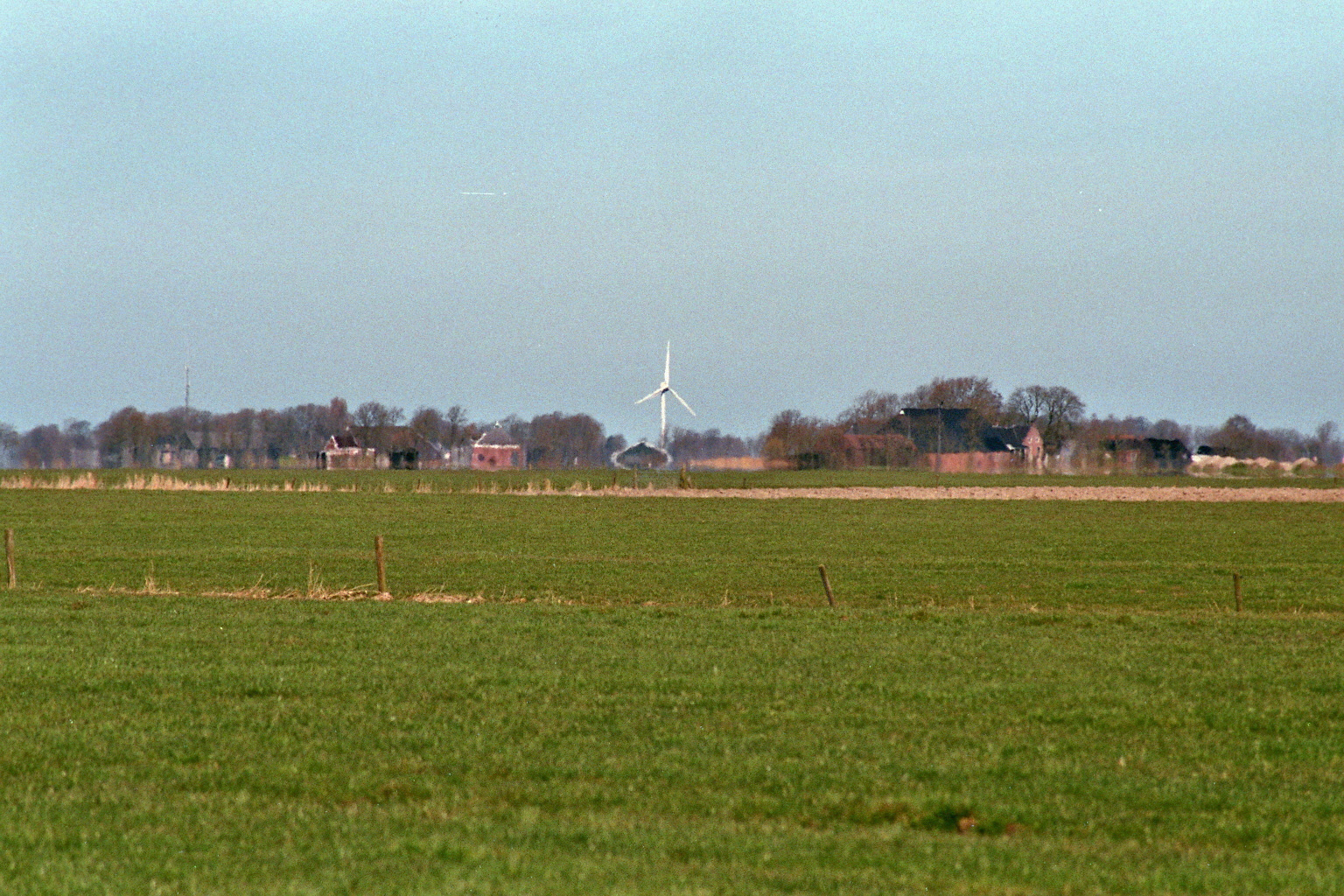
Landscape near Kantens

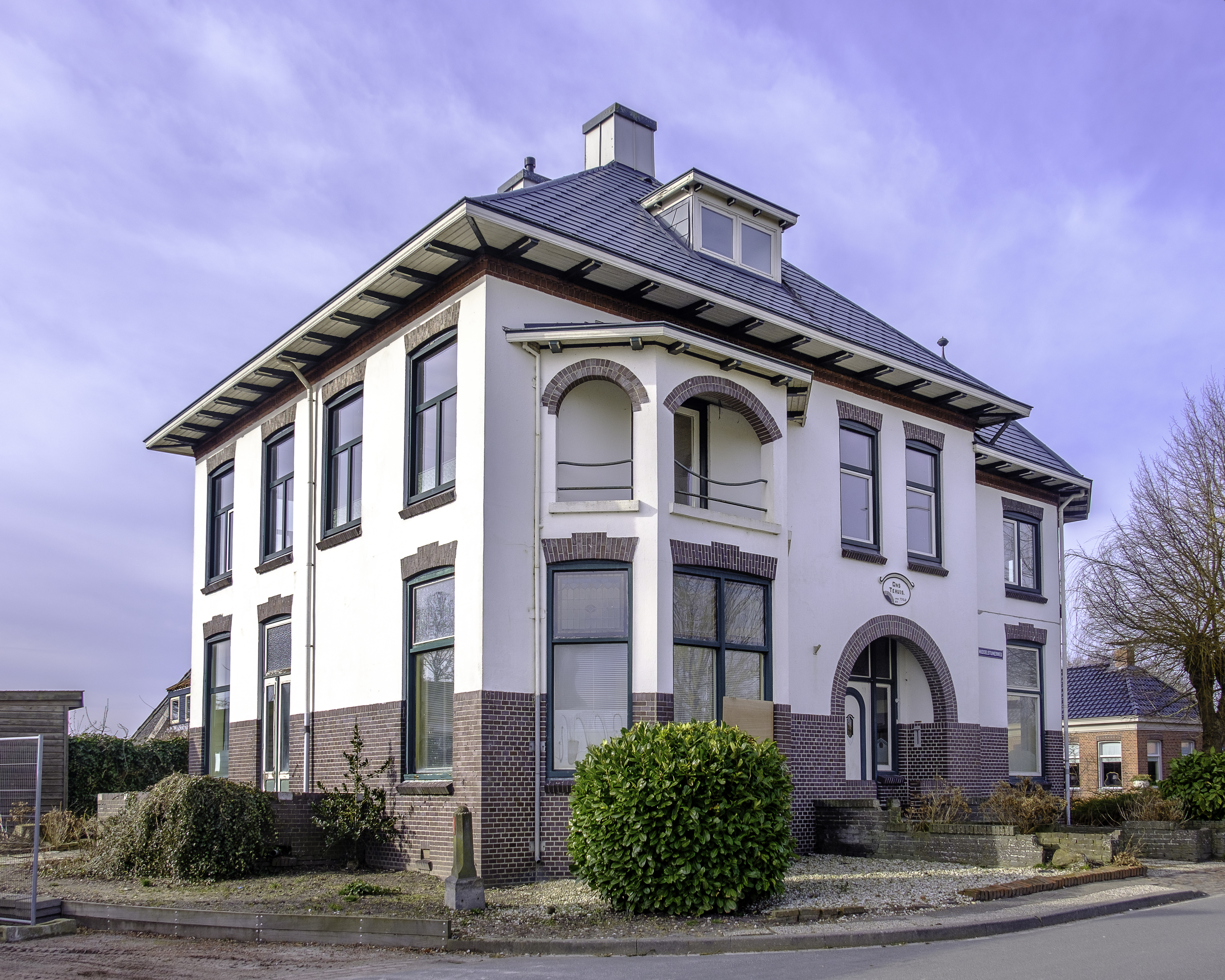
Villa in Kantens

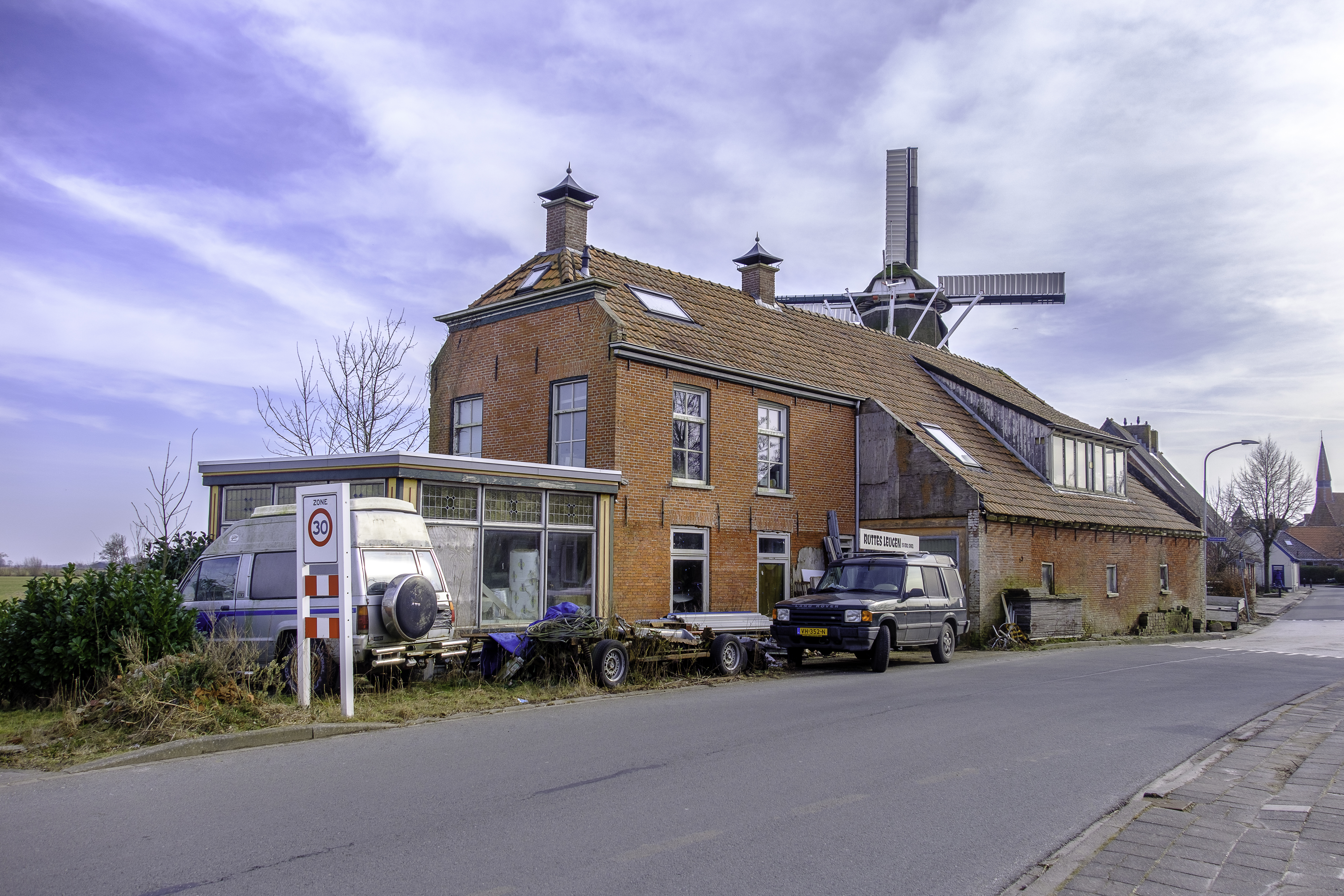
Street view

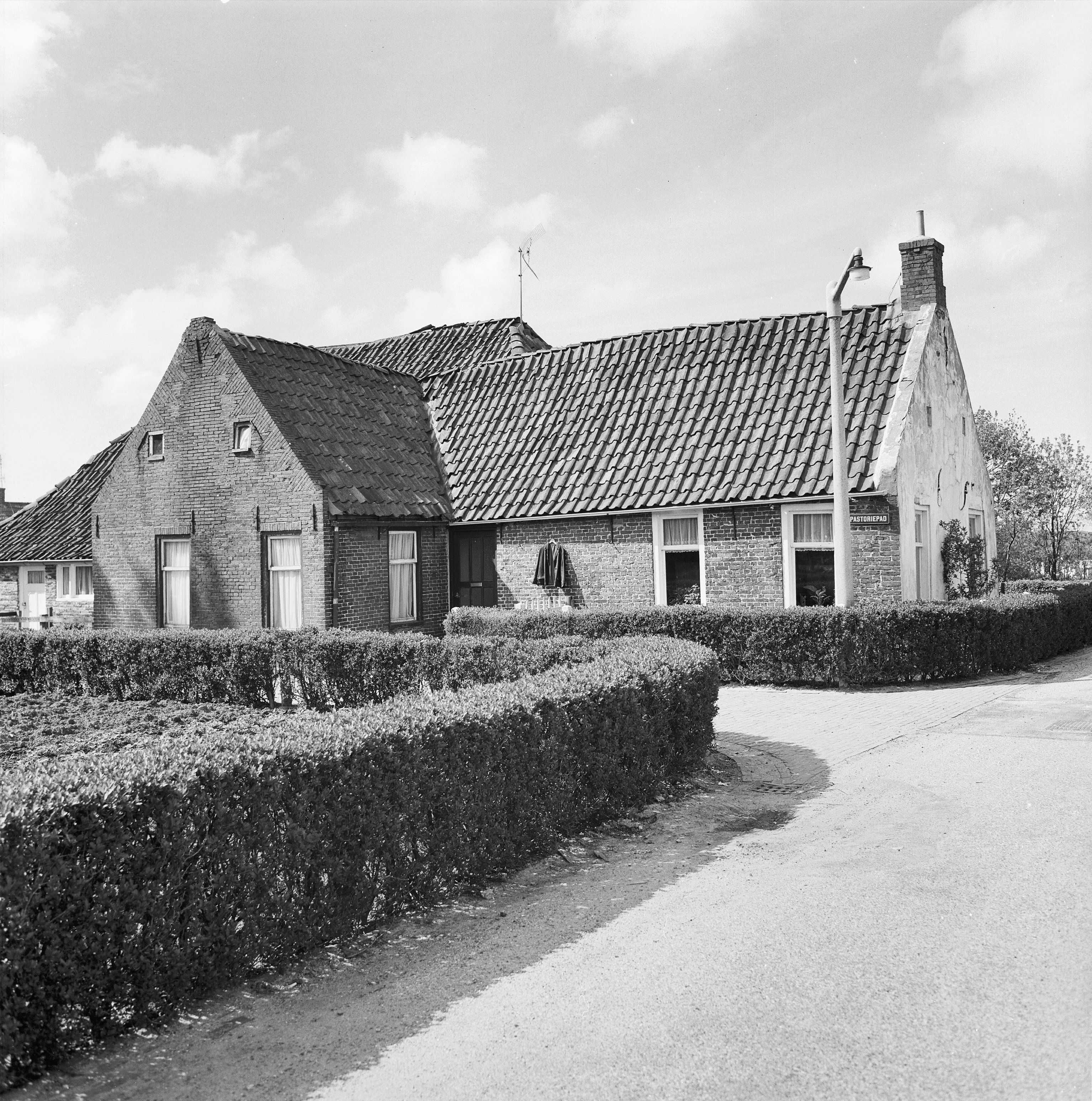
Farm in Kantens
