= Hefshuizen =

Coordinates: 53.415364°N 6.700459°E

Hefshuizen is a former municipality in the Dutch province of Groningen.

Hefshuizen was created in 1979, in the merger of the former municipalities of Uithuizen and Uithuizermeeden. In 1990, Kantens, Usquert, and Warffum were added, and in 1992, the name of the municipality was changed to Eemsmond.

== Symbols ==
Coat of Arms of the Municipality of Hefshuizen

Flag of the Municipality of Uithuizen (1950–1979) and also Flag of the Municipality of Hefshuizen (1979–1991)
