= Nuis, Netherlands =

Nuis Nuus (Gronings)
- Village
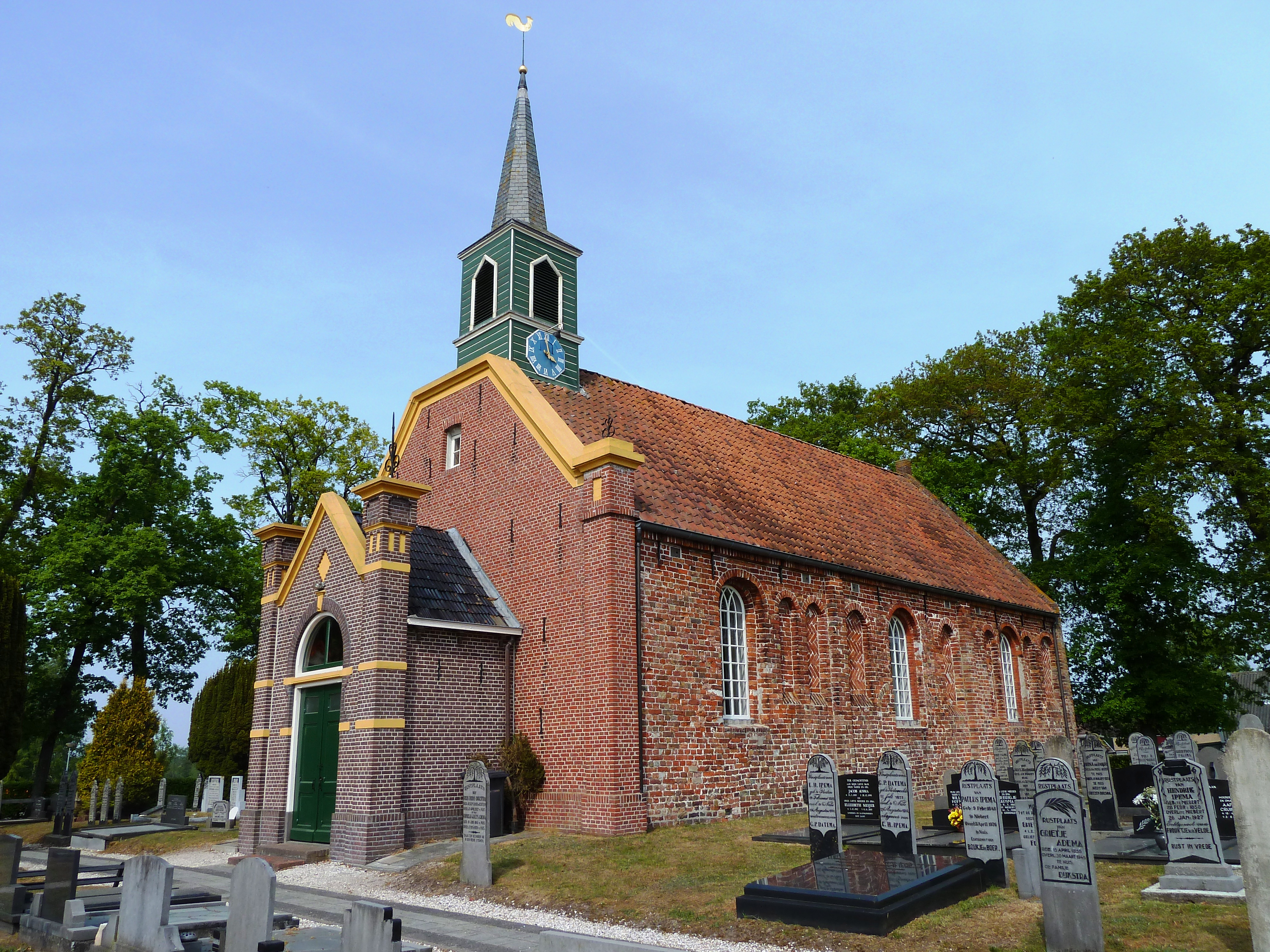
- Church of Nuis

- Flag Coat of arms

- Location in the province of Groningen in the Netherlands Nuis (Netherlands)
- Coordinates: 53°9′N 6°18′E
- Country: Netherlands
- Province: Groningen
- Municipality: Westerkwartier

Area
  - Total: 3.25 km^{2} (1.25 sq mi)
- Elevation: 2.3 m (7.5 ft)

Population (2021)
  - Total: 670
  - Density: 210/km^{2} (530/sq mi)
- Time zone: UTC+1 (CET)
  - Summer (DST): UTC+2 (CEST)
- Postcode: 9364
- Area code: 0594
- Website: nuisniebert.nl

Nuis (Dutch: [nœys]; Gronings: Nuus) is a village in the municipality of Westerkwartier in the province of Groningen in the Netherlands. As of 2021, it had a population of 670.

== Geography ==
The village is located between the villages of Marum and Leek. On the east side of the village is the almost-twin village of Niebert, with which Nuis shares a common residential axis. Outside the built-up area, the postal code area of Nuis extends much further to the west than to the east. On the east side of the village, Nuis changes almost immediately outside the built-up area into the postal code area of Niebert. On the west side are the hamlet of 't Malijk and the village of Marum. To the north of Nuis lies the village of Lucaswolde and the Oude Diep and to the south the Jonkersvaart. The village used to belong to the Vredewold surrounding area and is located on the same Geest as Marum, Niebert, De Holm and Tolbert. In the Middle Ages, this sand ridge in Westerkwartier became populated again and around the 10th century, people also started excavating the surrounding peat. In Nuis and Niebert, this created the characteristic landscape of opstrekkende heerden, from the Oude Diep to far into the peat areas near Zevenhuizen. For example, the then owner of the Coendersborg (at the time still Fossemaheerd) expanded his lands in such a way that it came to an encounter with the Lord of Nienoord at the Bolmeer.

All plots in this bocage landscape were separated from each other by ditches and canals, resulting in the characteristic bocage landscape of the southern Westerkwartier. The old, northern development axis of Nuis-Niebert lies on the Nieuweweg for Nuis and on the Molenweg for Niebert. The places of the church of Nuis and the church of Niebert still remind us of this. This axis was abandoned because the ground settled due to the excavation. Then they started building farms around the Malijksepad, called 'Oudeweg' in Nuis. Later, the development axis shifted north again. Due to the loss of the southern areas to the Lord of Nienoord, Nuis lost half of its area. With the emergence of the village of Jonkersvaart, Nuis lost even more surface area.

== History ==
Nuis was very prosperous in the 19th century. The village had a number of considerable farms, of which the Fossemaheerd, together with the Harkemaplaats and the Heringheplaats, grew into the Coendersborg. Another large farm in the village was the Offeringaheerd. In addition, the village also had three wind mills at that time. There was a corn mill on the plot immediately east of the community school 't Sterrenpad ('the Starry Path'), this was a tower mill, just like the Nieberter molen. There was a buckwheat mill on the Oudeweg between the Fossemalaan and the Van Teijenslaan. The third mill, a water mill, stood on a ditch next to the Schipsloot. The mill was owned by Benedictus van Teyens and was probably a spider's head or a seesaw mill. In the decades after the Second World War, Nuis grew again and a lot of new construction was carried out on the land between the Nieuweweg and the Oudeweg. This is how the Kerklaan, Coenderslaan, Fossemalaan, Van Teijenslaan, and the Offeringalaan developed and Nuis got its current appearance.

Before the merged municipality of Westerkwartier was formed in 2019, Nuis belonged to the municipality of Marum. The flag and coat of arms of Nuis have been applied by both the villages of Nuis and Niebert in 2011, which are sometimes referred to conjointly as 'Nuis-Niebert' because of their relative proximity.

== Sights ==
=== Church ===
On the west side of the village is the Reformed church of Nuis. The church is a medieval hall church from the 13th century and is largely built in Romano-Gothic style. This style is very rare in this region. The church is located on a raised hill that is also very iconic for the village. The interior is strongly influenced by the inhabitants of the Coendersborg. For example, there are twelve funerary hatchments belonging to the Van Teyens and Fockens families in the church.

=== Coendersborg ===
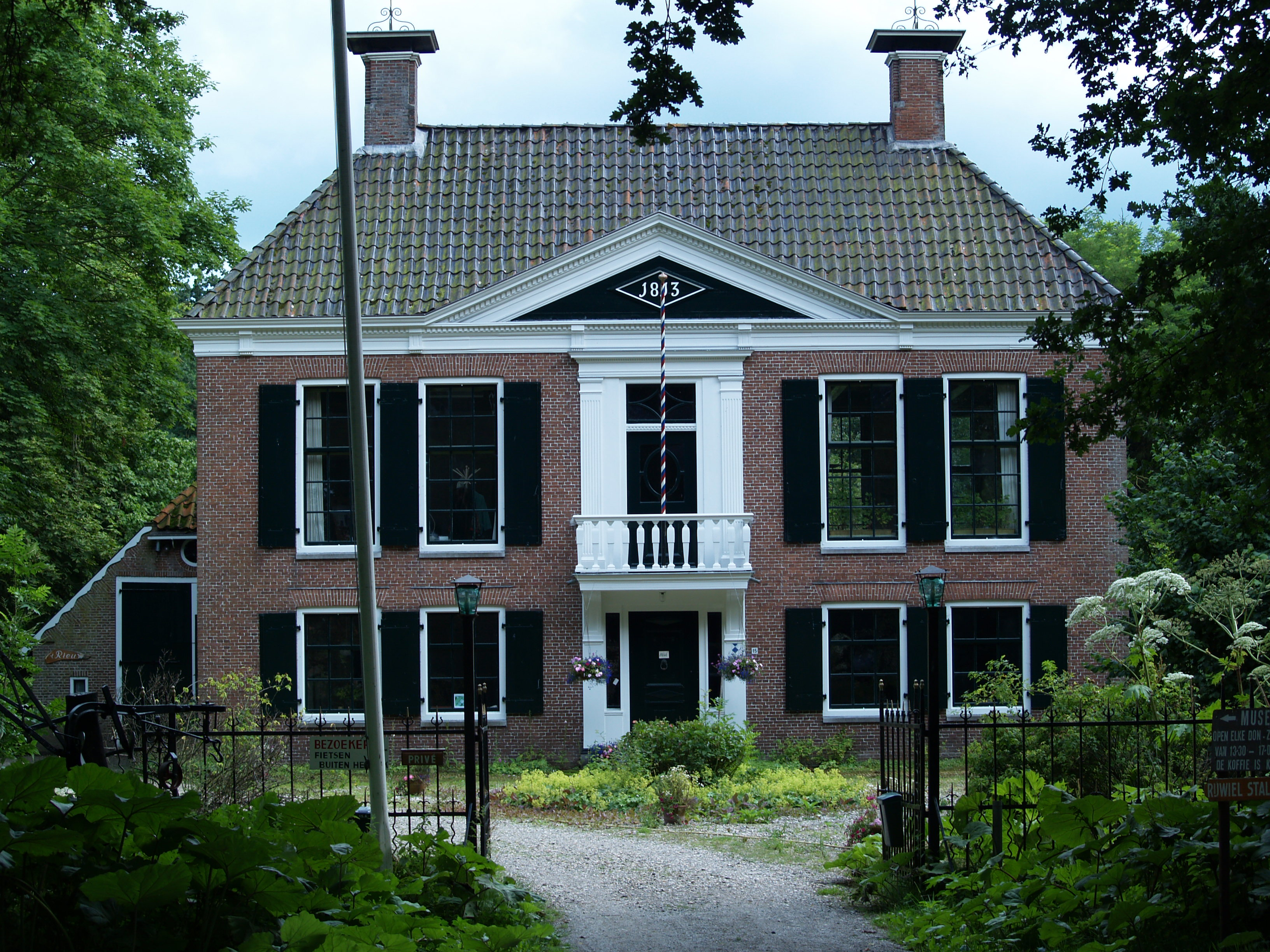
Coendersborg

On the southwest side of the village is the Coendersborg, a moated borg from 1813. The borg is located on the Malijksepad and originated from three heerds, including the Fossemaheerd. On either side of the borg are two monumental farms, the western one of which is still in use as a farm. The part of the estate that was left after the sale of many lands was planted in the 20th century with coniferous and deciduous forest, partly in the English landscape style. Nowadays this nature reserve is called 'Coendersbos'. It is now owned by Het Groninger Landschap Foundation and is freely accessible to cyclists and walkers. Previously, the agricultural museum 't Rieuw (rieuw = 'tools') was housed in the barn and garden of the estate. In 2012, the museum was transferred to the farm east of the deposit, popularly known as Kimm's farm. For this purpose, the farm has been completely renovated and the plot is equipped with a parking space. The front house of the farm is used as a holiday home.

=== Camp Nuis ===
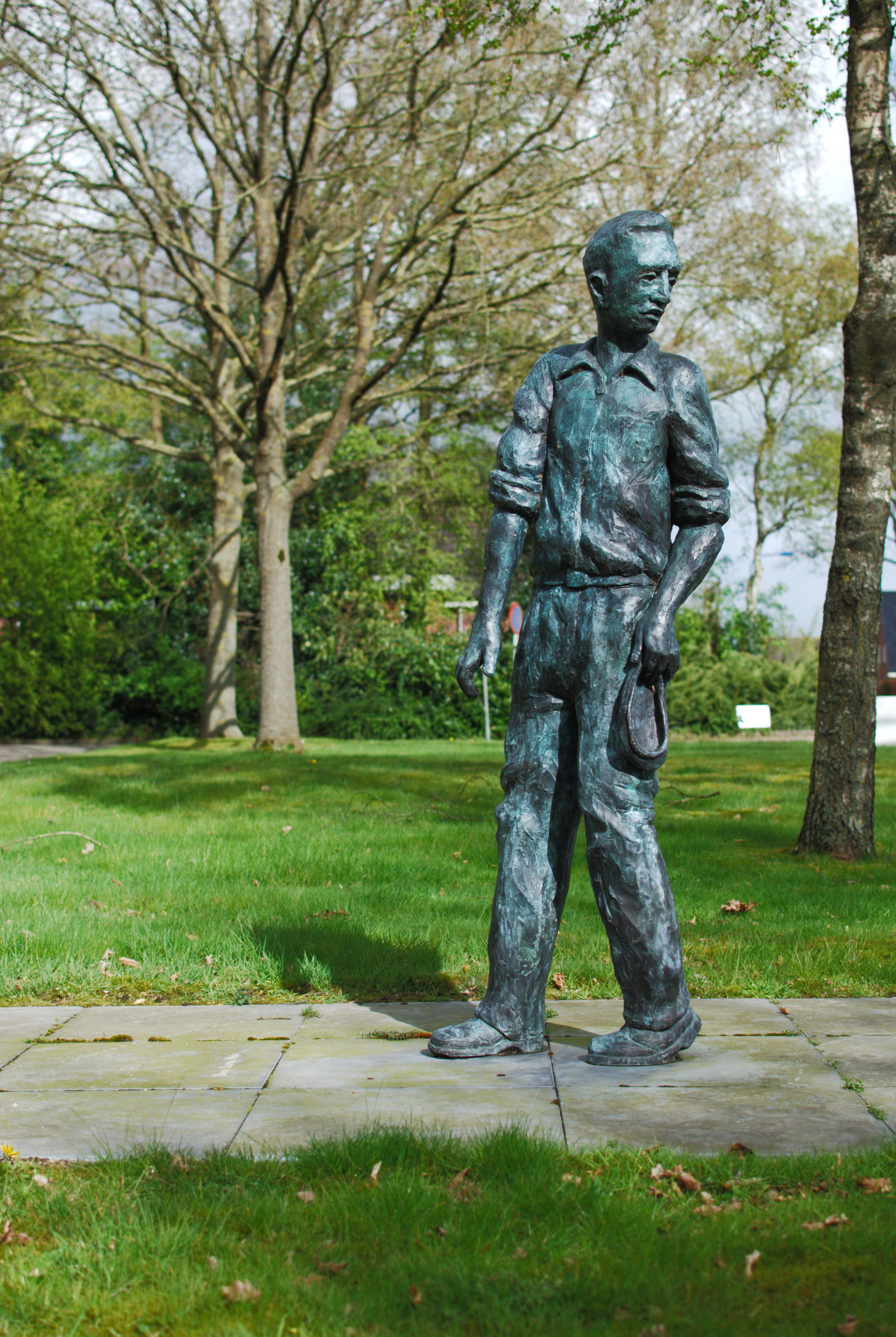
Monument at Camp Nuis

In 1941 a labor camp was set up by the Dutch Labor Service. After the war, captured collaborators were imprisoned in Camp Nuis. After that, the camp housed young prisoners, and after 1951, Ambonese. The camp was demolished after 1964. In 2016, another barrack of the former camp that was used as a shed turned up in Jonkersvaart. It is hoped to be able to return this barrack to Nuis, possibly to museum 't Rieuw.

==== Northern Archaeological Depot ====
Today, the Northern Archaeological Depot (NAD) is located on the site of the camp. All archaeological finds (now a few million) from the three northern provinces are housed here and from here they are loaned to museums.

== Gallery ==
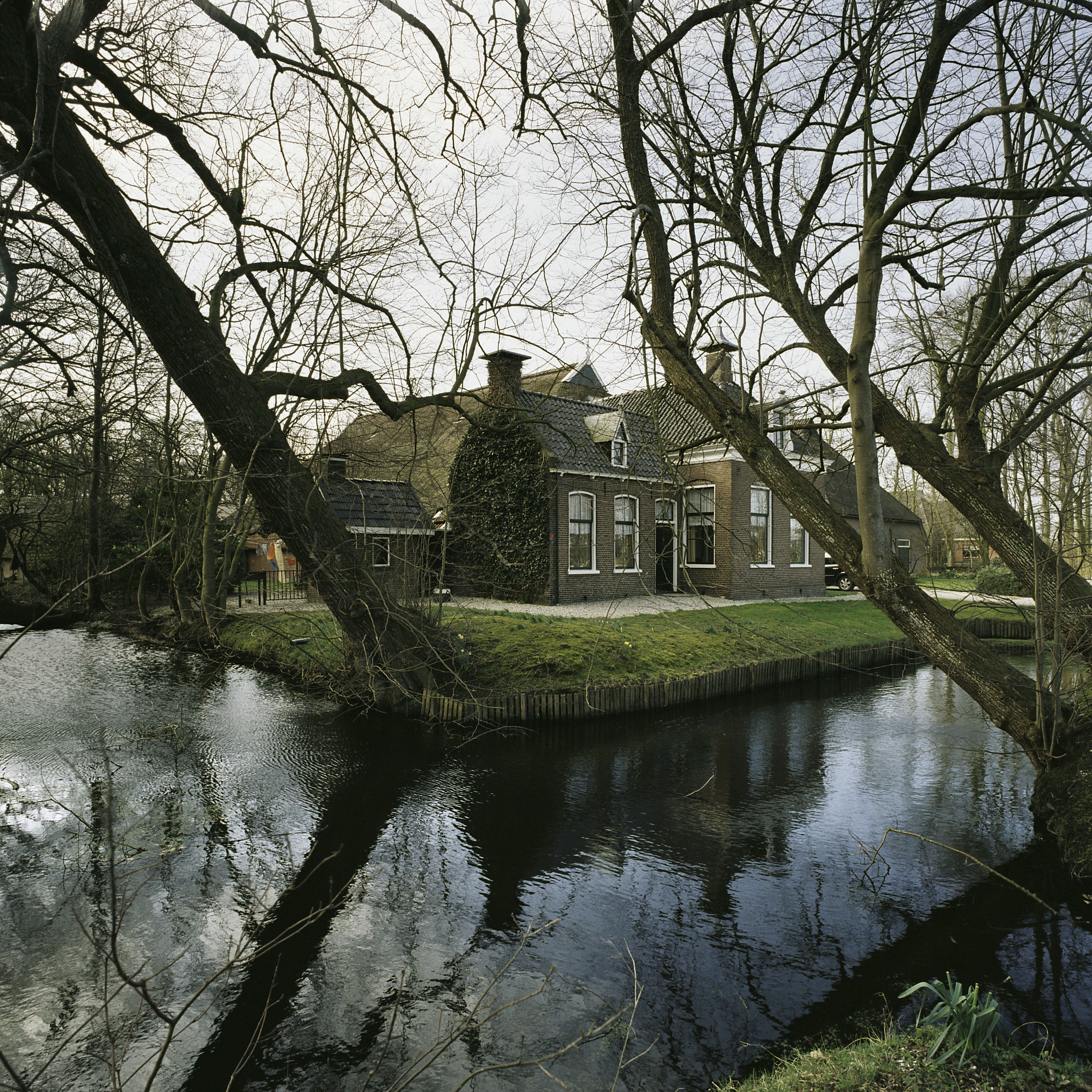
Moated farm in Nuis

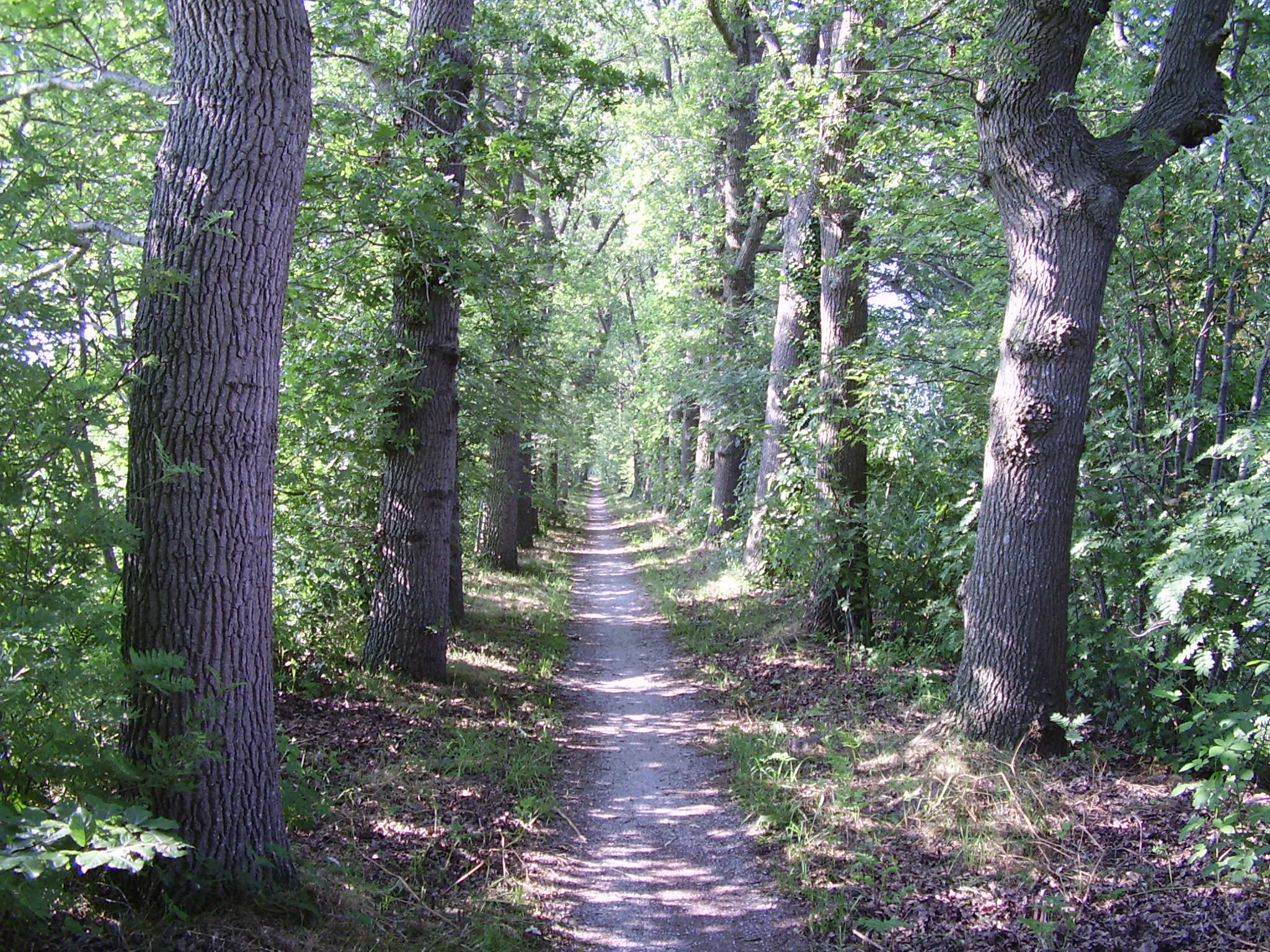
Bicycle path through the Coendersborg garden

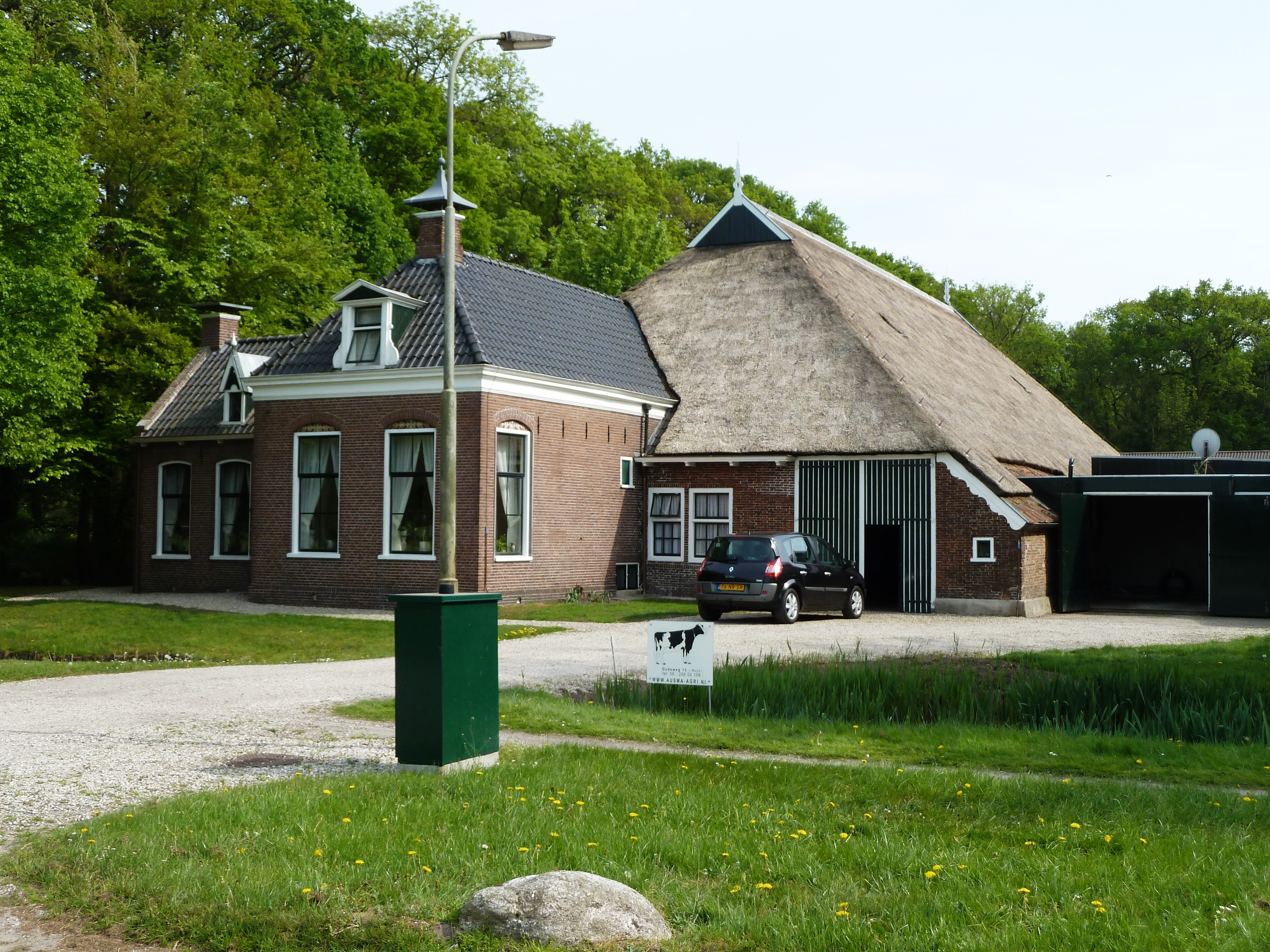
Head-rump farmhouse to the south of Coendersborg
