= Lucaswolde =

- Village
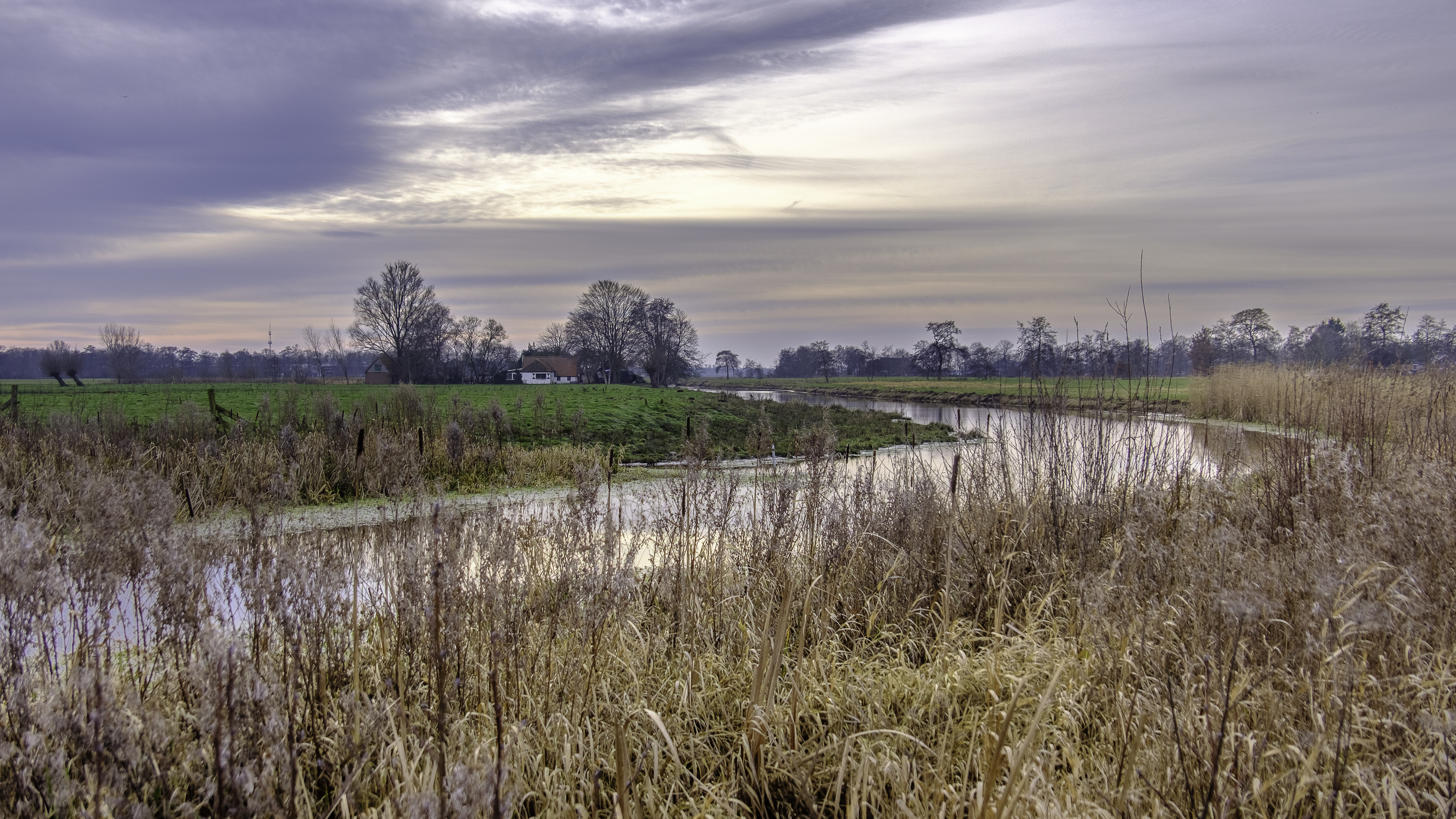
- Landscape near Lucaswolde

- Flag Coat of arms

- Location in the province of Groningen in the Netherlands Lucaswolde (Netherlands)
- Coordinates: 53°11′N 6°18′E
- Country: Netherlands
- Province: Groningen
- Municipality: Westerkwartier

Area
  - Total: 4.87 km^{2} (1.88 sq mi)
- Elevation: 0.3 m (0.98 ft)

Population (2021)
  - Total: 195
  - Density: 40.0/km^{2} (104/sq mi)
- Time zone: UTC+1 (CET)
  - Summer (DST): UTC+2 (CEST)
- Postcode: 9825
- Area code: 0594

Lucaswolde (Dutch pronunciation: [ˌlykɑsˈʋɔldə]) is a linear village in the municipality of Westerkwartier in the province of Groningen in the Netherlands. The village is located between Marum and Boerakker. As of 2021, it had a population of 195.

Just south of the region, on the Dwarsdiep, is a nature reserve in the Oude Riet polder. This is a popular place, especially for bird watchers.

== History ==
This part of the Westerkwartier consisted of wildland, owned by the farmers of Marum, Niebert and Nuis. There were some scattered buildings, which were only accessible from Noordwijk. This remained the case well into the nineteenth century. Only in 1878 was a sand path built to Boerakker.

In the Middle Ages, the village had its own village church, dating from the twelfth or thirteenth century, which fell into disrepair around 1540. In 1596 no one lived there anymore. The parish was merged with Noordwijk, but the lands of the church and presbytery continued to have their own managers. The cemetery still existed in the 19th century. Now this is a farmyard (at Hooiweg 11).

In 1528 the Dominican nuns of Oosterreide bought land here. The Susteren van Reyde ('Sisters of Reide') were looking for a new place to live because of the floods in the Dollart area and had a monastic grange or uythof built in Lucaswolde, which still existed in 1539.

The flag and coat of arms of Lucaswolde have been applied by both the villages of Boerakker and Lucaswolde in 2009, which are sometimes referred to conjointly as 'Boerakker-Lucaswolde' because of their relative proximity.
