= Niebert =

Niebert Nijbert (Gronings)
- Village
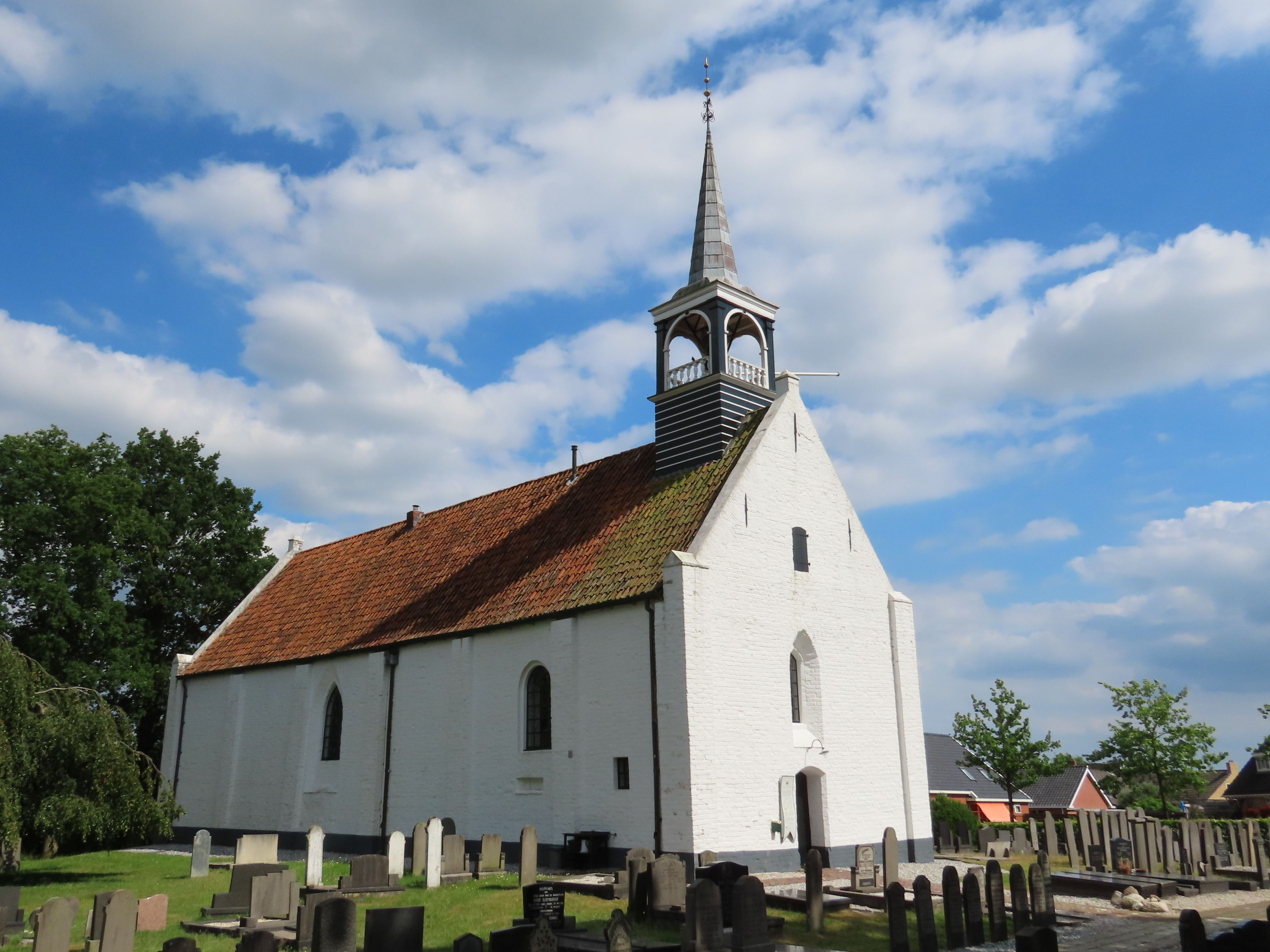
- Church of Niebert

- Flag Coat of arms

- Location in the province of Groningen in the Netherlands Niebert (Netherlands)
- Coordinates: 53°10′N 6°20′E
- Country: Netherlands
- Province: Groningen
- Municipality: Westerkwartier

Area
  - Total: 4.24 km^{2} (1.64 sq mi)
- Elevation: 2.3 m (7.5 ft)

Population (2021)
  - Total: 745
  - Density: 176/km^{2} (455/sq mi)
- Time zone: UTC+1 (CET)
  - Summer (DST): UTC+2 (CEST)
- Postcode: 9365
- Area code: 0594
- Website: nuisniebert.nl

Niebert (Dutch pronunciation: [ˈnibɛrt]; Gronings: Nijbert) is a village in the municipality of Westerkwartier in the province of Groningen in the Netherlands. As of 2021, it had a population of 745.

== Geography ==
Niebert is located in the bocage landscape of the southern Westerkwartier in the former Ommeland Vredewold. The village originated as a linear village on the old Geest of Vredewold. Characteristic are the opstrekkende heerden that extend far to the south of the village and are bordered in the north by the Oude Diep.

Niebert actually consists of two habitation axes. The northern one (the Molenweg) is the primary extraction axis where most of the buildings and the old church are located today. The southern one is the Malijksepad (locally called 't Pad), a footpath that runs over the old sand ridge between Marum and Tolbert. Here are a number of farms and the Iwema stone house (see history). Traditionally, the farms were located on the primary extraction axis, but after the soil had settled as a result of peat extraction there, they were moved to the south. The church was left alone. In the 19th century, the buildings shifted again to the northern axis. The Malijksepad has never been more than a footpath, which was connected to the primary extraction axis by the driveways of the farms.

To the east of the village lies the hamlet of De Holm and to the southwest, around the Grouwweg, the neighborhood of Grouw. To the south lies Jonkersvaart. To the west lies the village of Nuis, and to the north the villages of Lucaswolde and Boerakker.

== History ==
The foundation of Niebert probably originated from Tolbert. The name Tolbert is a contraction of het (the definite article), ol(de) ('old'), and bert ('neighbourhood'), and, therefore, literally means "the old neighbourhood". As such, Niebert means "new village" (nie = 'new', bert = 'neighbourhood'). Further to the northeast is the village of Lettelbert; "little neighborhood". The village was probably founded as a marginal peat reclamation in the late Middle Ages.

In the 16th century, large-scale peat bogs around Niebert began to be extracted and many peat workers came to live in the village. In the 19th century, Niebert more or less had a central function for the surrounding area and was a prosperous village. In the 20th century, development stagnated.

The flag and coat of arms of Niebert have been applied by both the villages of Niebert and Nuis in 2011, which are sometimes referred to conjointly as 'Nuis-Niebert' because of their relative proximity.

== Sights ==
=== Church ===
The church of Niebert is a white-plastered hall church, built in the second half of the fourteenth century. The church is owned by the Stichting Oude Groninger Kerken (Old Groninger Churches Foundation).

The church has a roof turret that was built in 1773. The bell from 1681 was stolen by the German occupiers. The current clock is from 1949.

=== Steenhuis ===
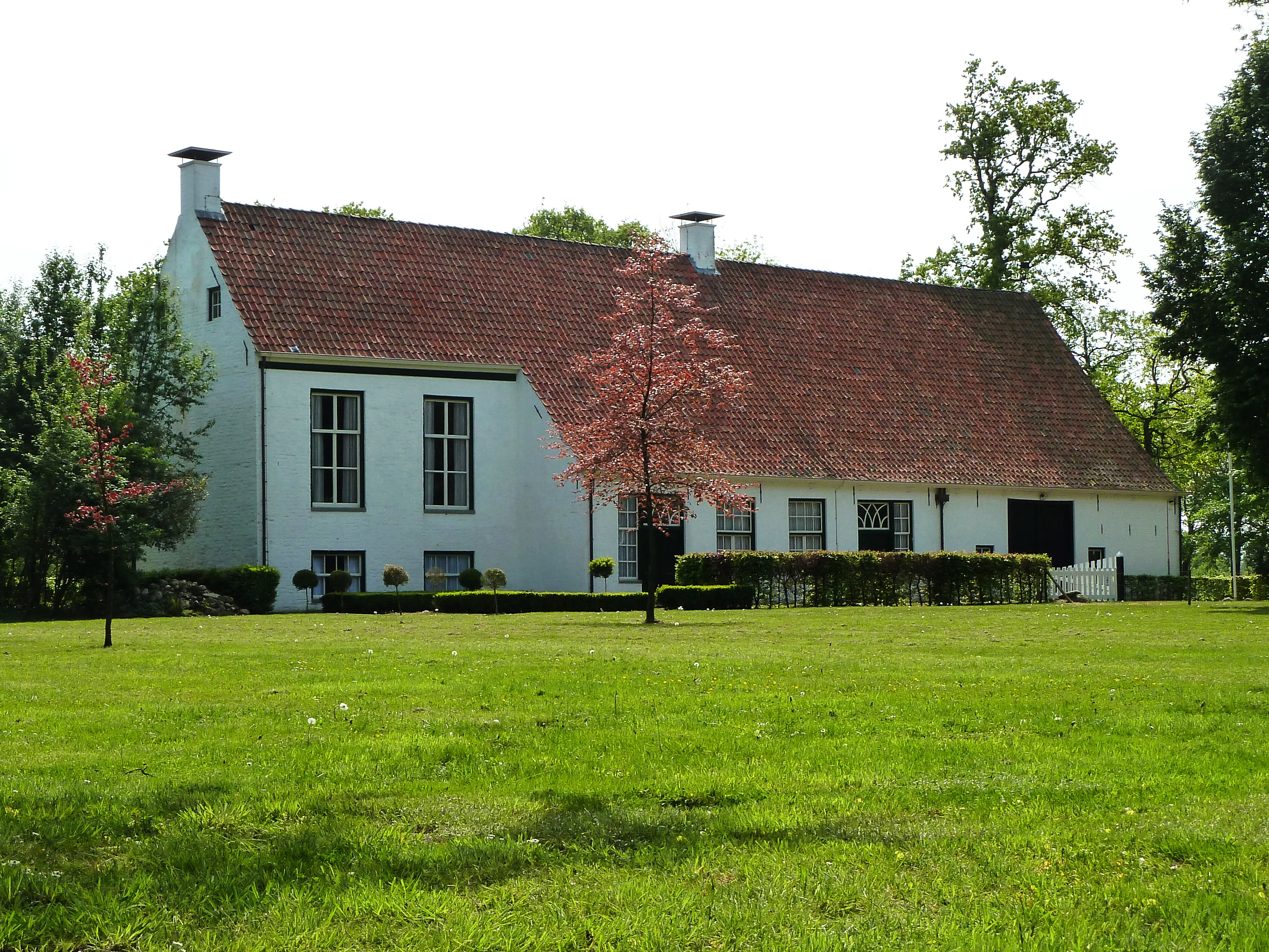
Iwema steenhuis

Probably between 1375 and 1400, the steenhuis ('stone house') Iwema was built south of Niebert. Unlike many other steenhuizen, this steenhuis never evolved into a borg, probably because the Iwema family was not of nobility. They did, however, sometimes fulfill the function of grietman and redger. Later, the house was inhabited by the Ibema family. The house was renovated in 1847 by the local reverend Reinder Damsté, who wanted to use it as a presbytery, transformed into a head-rump farm, whereby the steenhuis was also lowered and the whole was plastered white. A barn on the north side and a small shed on the east side were demolished and a new barn was built on the west side. In 1851 the house was bought by the De Boer family (who bought the adjacent Bouwsemaheerd in 1844), who are related to the Iwemas along the female line. Their descendants still live there, but in 1988 they sold the property to the Het Groninger Landschap foundation, so that they could restore it. Today Iwema is the only remaining steenhuis in the province of Groningen. The house cannot be visited, but the barn was converted in 1988 into the 'painters and bakery museum 't Steenhuus'. The museum was previously located in the Nieberter molen, a nearby windmill, and the barn behind it from 1986. The garden of the house is said to be the largest red beech in the province of Groningen. The moat around the stone house has grown over the years.

=== Farms ===
On the east side of the steenhuis, at 't Pad 17, is the Bouwsemaheerd farm, whose family was related to the Iwema family. Three canals have been dug around this farm in the shape of the letters J, F, and L. According to one story, this is the result of a marriage in 1738. On the west side of the steenhuis, at 't Pad 4, is a farm that was built between 1851 and 1852.

=== Other buildings ===
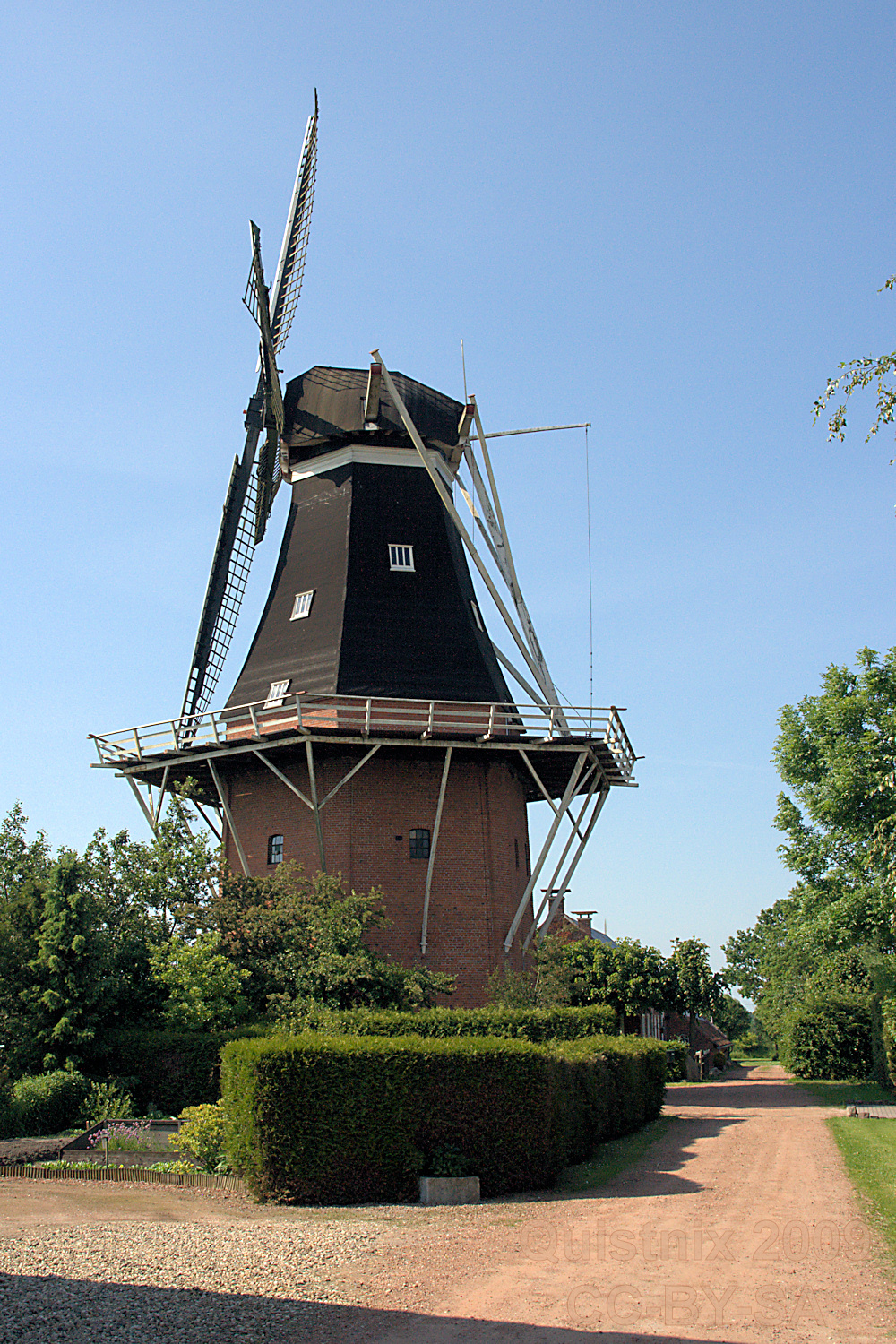
The Nieberter molen

There was already a corn mill in the village before 1628, which was demolished in 1895. In 1899, a peeling and oil mill from 1818 was removed from Zandeweer as a replacement and rebuilt in Niebert as a flour mill in the form of a hexagonal scaffolding mill; the Nieberter molen. The mill house with the transverse front house next to it also dates from around 1899. The Nieberter molen was the only remaining mill in the former municipality of Marum and is the only hexagonal mill in the north of the country. The mill was restored in 1965 and 1973. The municipality of Marum bought the mill in 1973 for the latter restoration. In 2011, the municipality transferred the mill to the Het Groninger Landschap foundation.

Niebert has had a public and a Christian primary school for a long time. The public one was the oldest. In 1883 a new building was built for this purpose. Until 1909, the children from Boerakker also went to school here. In 1932, a school teacher and her husband died when they were hit by a tram. The public primary school was closed around 1990.

In 1928, a Christian primary school was built in Niebert. In 1992 it was given the name De Kring ('The Circle'), when the school officially switched to Jenaplan education. In 2002, the school was faced with a lack of space, which was the prelude to discussions about cooperation with a public school in Nuis. In 2011, both schools moved to the community school 't Sterrenpad ('the Starry Path') in Nuis, and the village lost its last school.

== Gallery ==
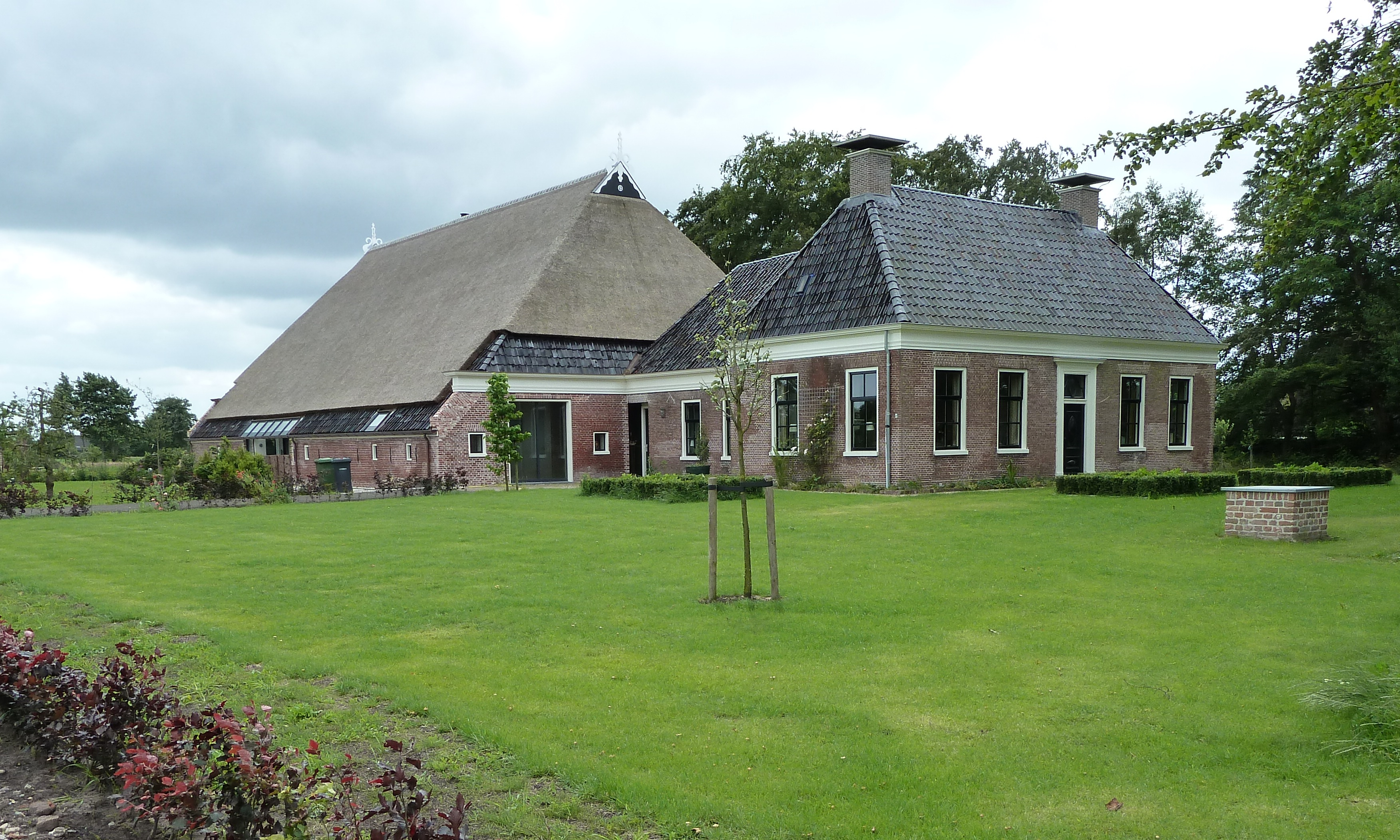
Farm at 't Pad 4

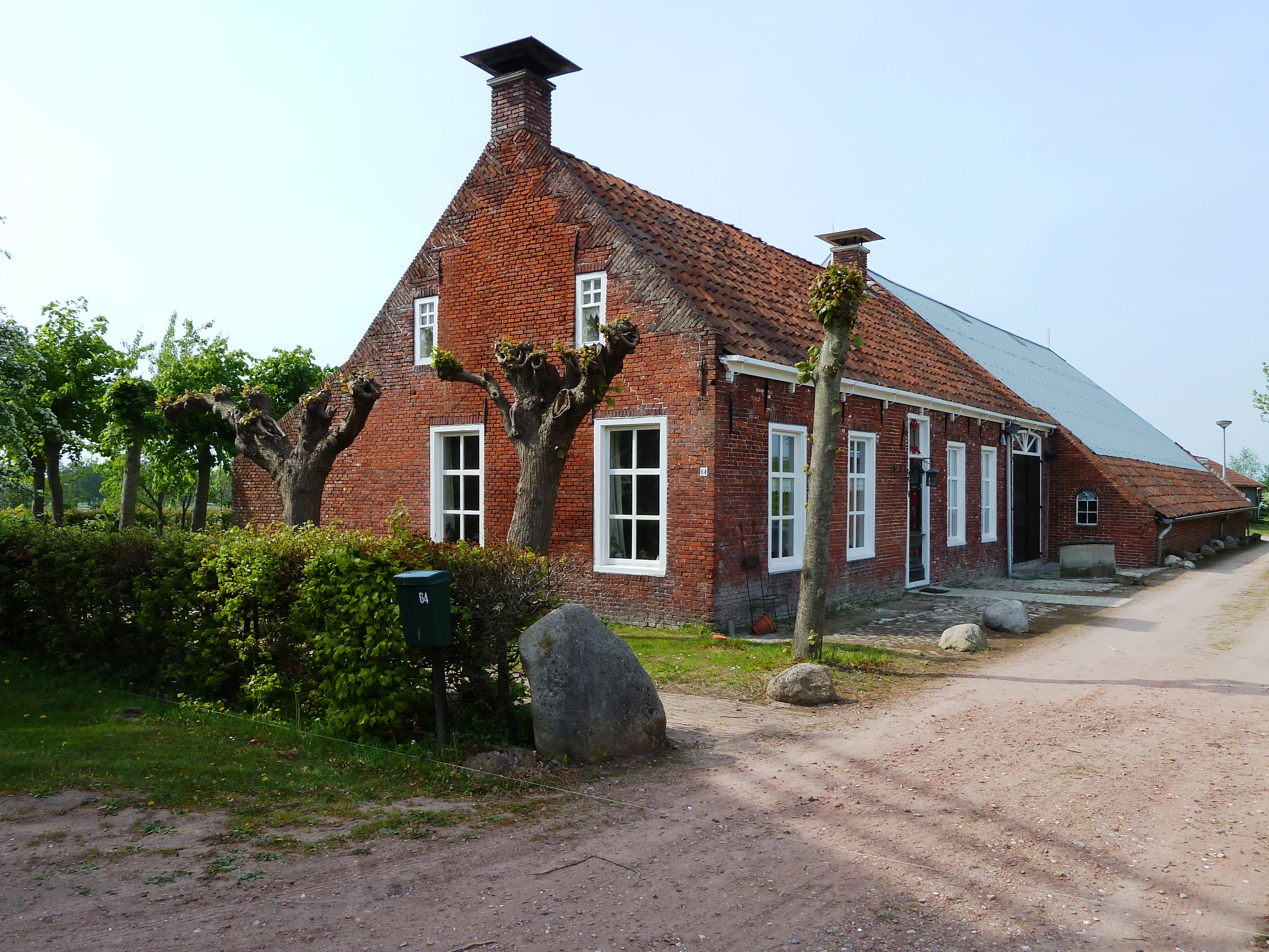
Mill house

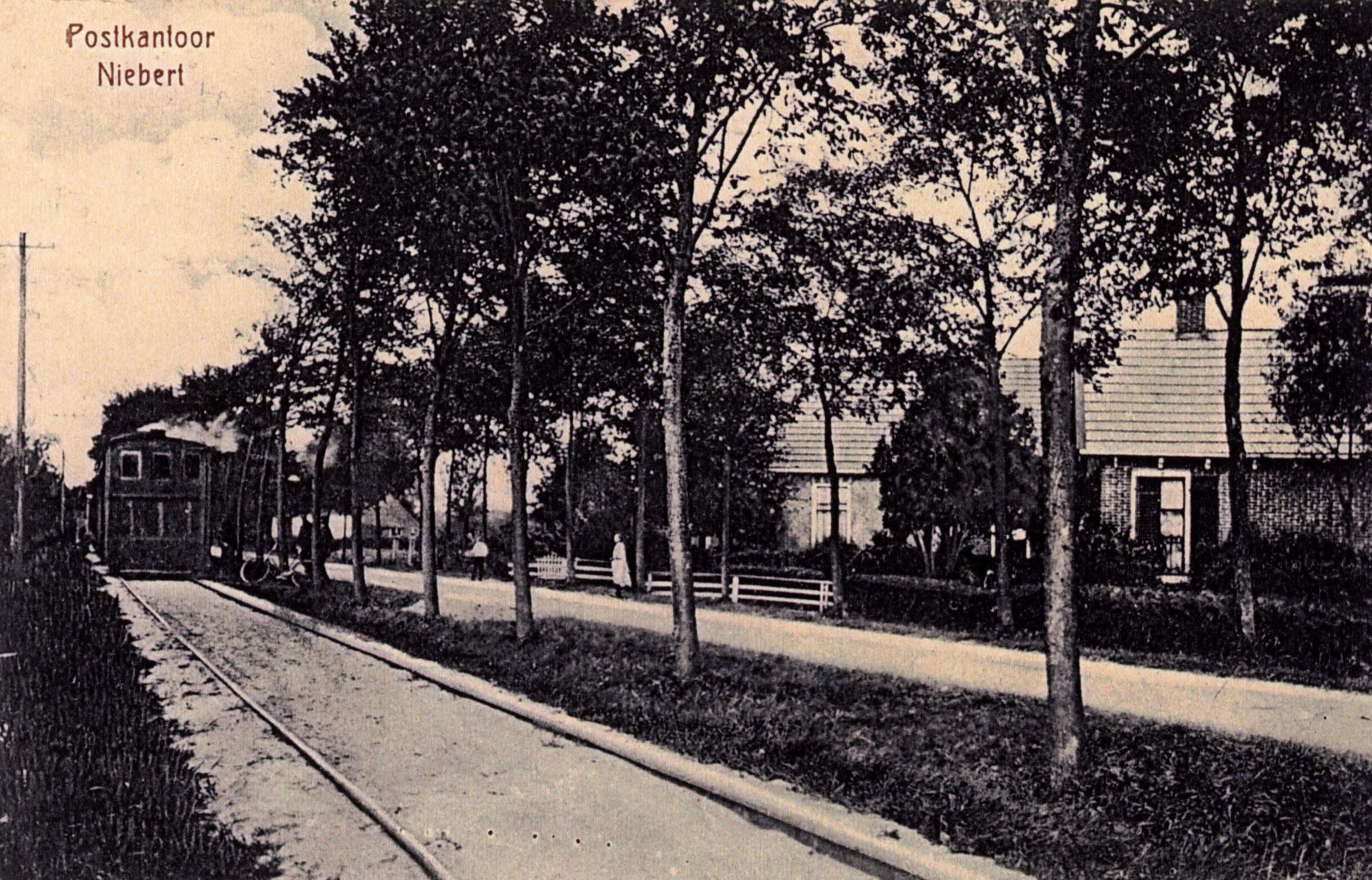
Old tram line in Niebert

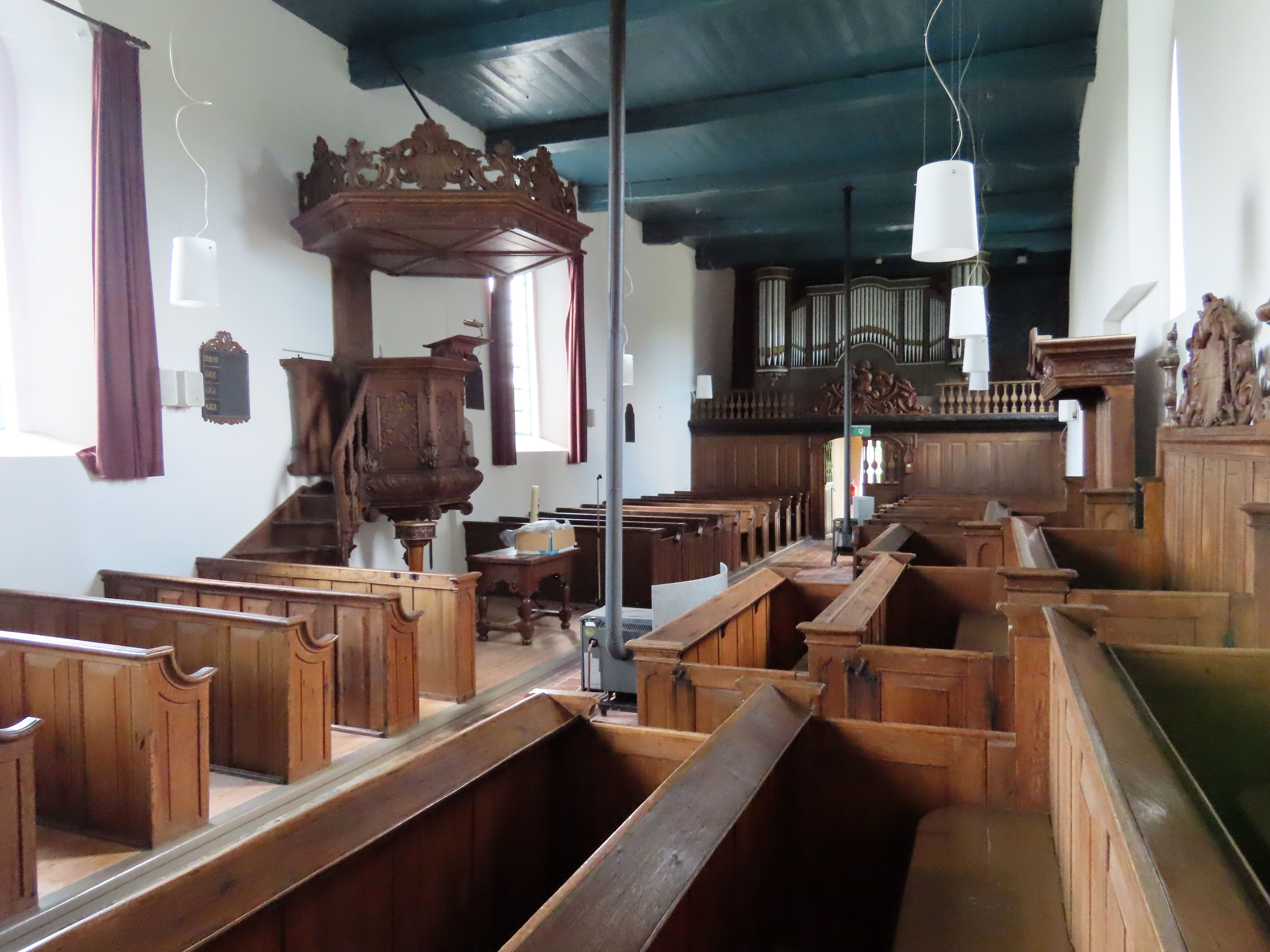
Interior of the church

== Notable people ==
- Andrea Deelstra (1985), long-distance runner
