= Deelstra =

Deelstra is a Dutch surname. Notable people with the surname include:

- Andrea Deelstra (born 1985), Dutch long-distance runner
- Atje Keulen-Deelstra (1938–2013), Dutch speed skater
