= Boerakker =

- Village
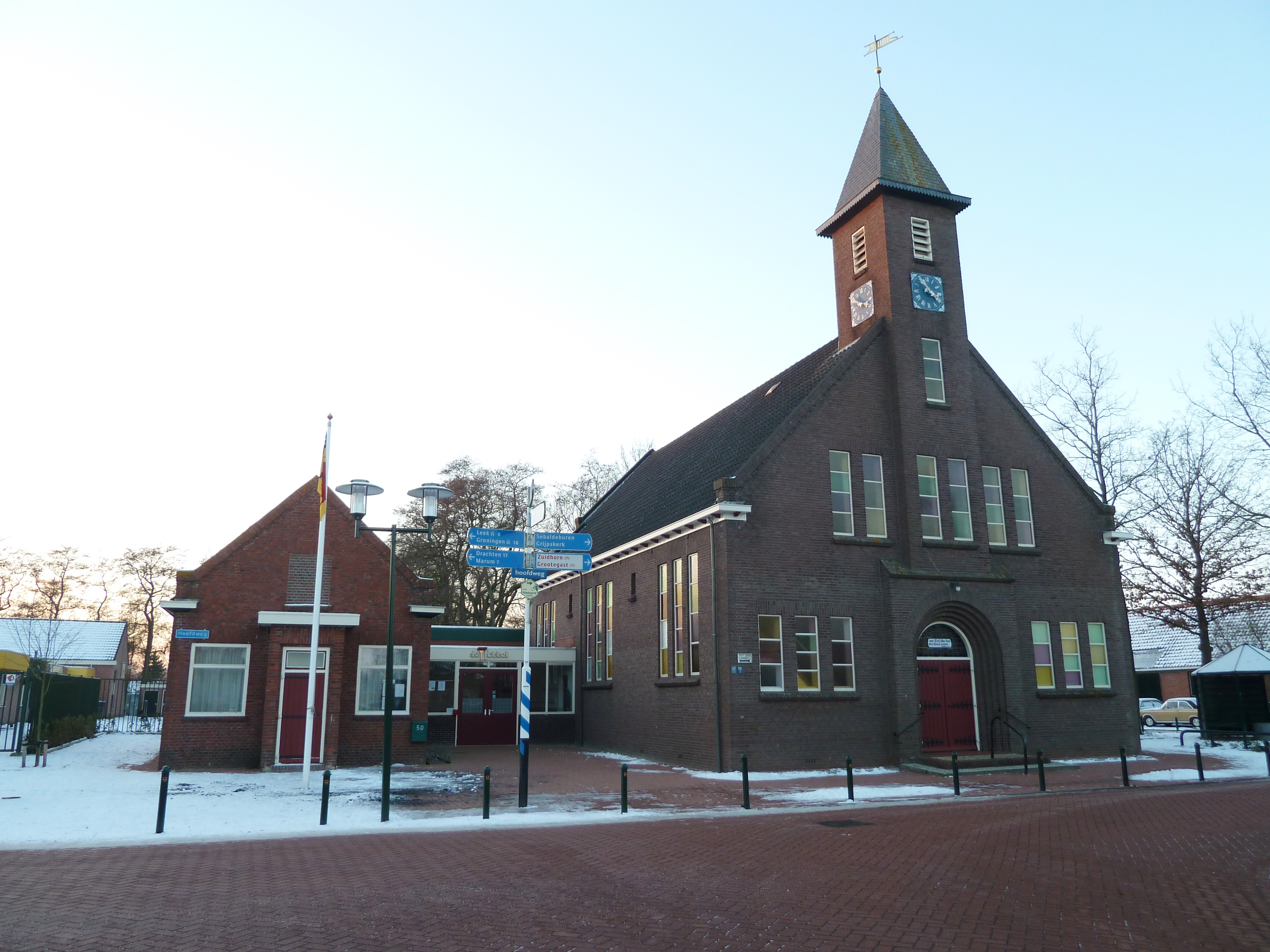
- Reformed church of Boerakker

- Flag Coat of arms

- Location in the province of Groningen in the Netherlands Boerakker (Netherlands)
- Coordinates: 53.18671°N 6.32943°E
- Country: Netherlands
- Province: Groningen
- Municipality: Westerkwartier

Area
  - Total: 0.65 km^{2} (0.25 sq mi)
- Elevation: 0.6 m (2.0 ft)

Population (2021)
  - Total: 800
  - Density: 1,200/km^{2} (3,200/sq mi)
- Time zone: UTC+1 (CET)
  - Summer (DST): UTC+2 (CEST)
- Postcode: 9361
- Area code: 0594

Boerakker (Dutch pronunciation: [buːrˈɑkər]) is a village in the municipality of Westerkwartier in the province of Groningen in the Netherlands. It is located to the north of the village of Marum. As of 2021, it had a population of 800.

== History ==
Boerakker originated in a peat area that is located between the high sand ridges of Langewold in the north and Vredewold in the south of the Westerkwartier. The dirt road Boerenakkers or Buurackers may date back to the late Middle Ages. The name Buiracker appears on a so-called seal from 1686, in which Lubbe Iwema sells a farm in Niebert to Jan and Johannes Engberts. The first demonstrable buildings are indicated on a military topographical map from the early 19th century. The cadastral map of the former municipality of Marum en Leek from 1829 shows the Reformed church and two houses. In 1867 there were ten houses.

Between 1900 and 1910 an actual village was created, with about fifteen houses. In the following decades it grew into the current village. In the 1970s and 1980s, the village was expanded with new construction on the west side of the village, on the Olde Ee. In 2006, expansion took place in a southerly direction along the Hoofdweg.

For a long time, Boerakker was not an 'ordinary' village. Until the municipal reorganization in 1990, it was divided into two municipalities, namely the municipality of Marum and Leek. The main road formed the border. After the reclassification, the village in its entirety fell into Marum. It was striking that both municipalities gave a different status to the village. The municipality of Leek considered Boerakker to be part of Tolbert, while Marum gave the village Boerakker the status of village. The outlying area of Boerakker on the east and north side of De Jammer belonged to the municipality of Leek as 'Boerakker, municipality of Leek'. After the municipal reorganization of 1 January 2019 this all belongs to the municipality of Westerkwartier.

The flag and coat of arms of Boerakker have been applied by both the villages of Boerakker and Lucaswolde in 2009, which are sometimes referred to conjointly as 'Boerakker-Lucaswolde' because of their relative proximity.

== Gallery ==
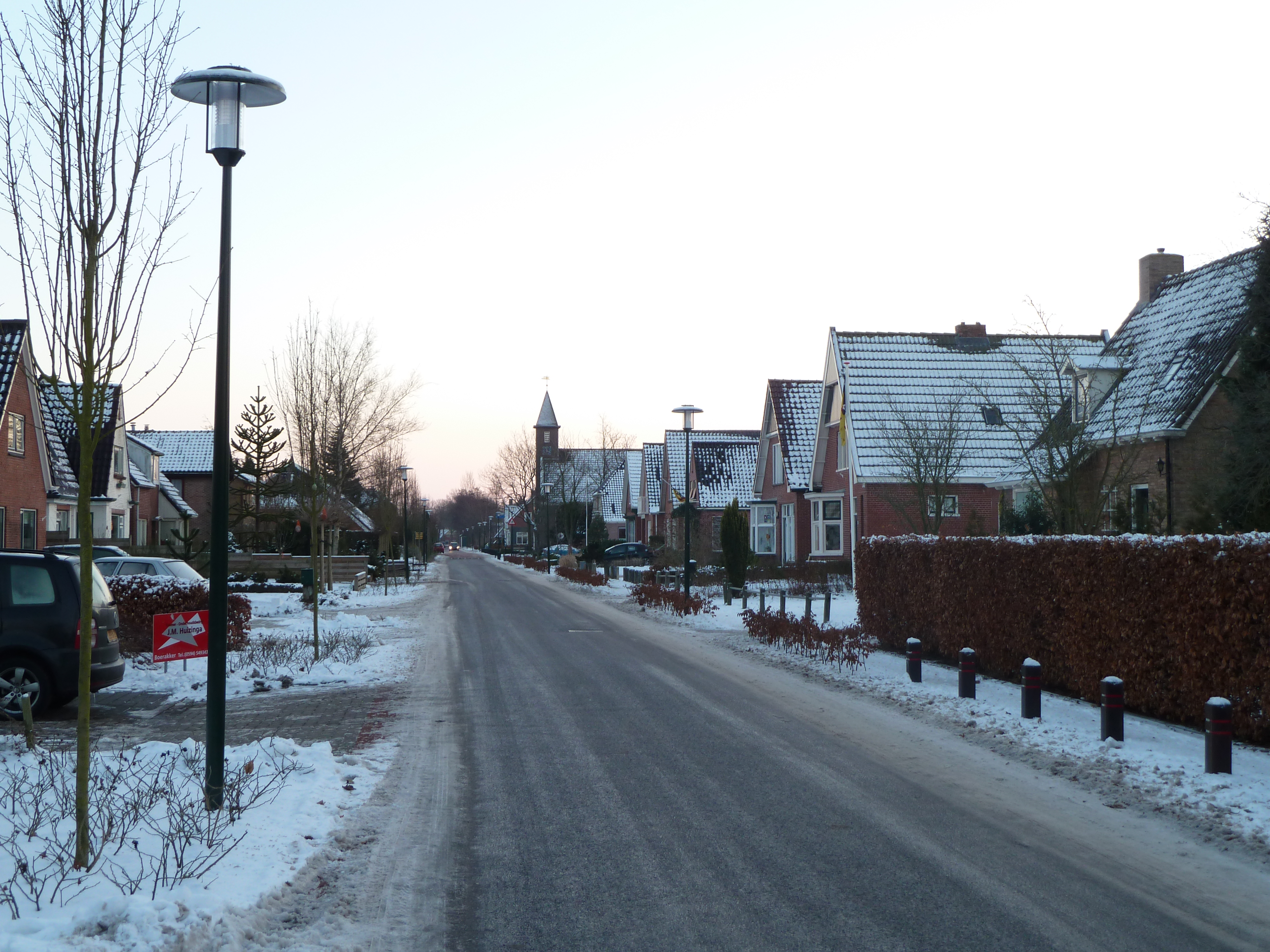
The main road during winter

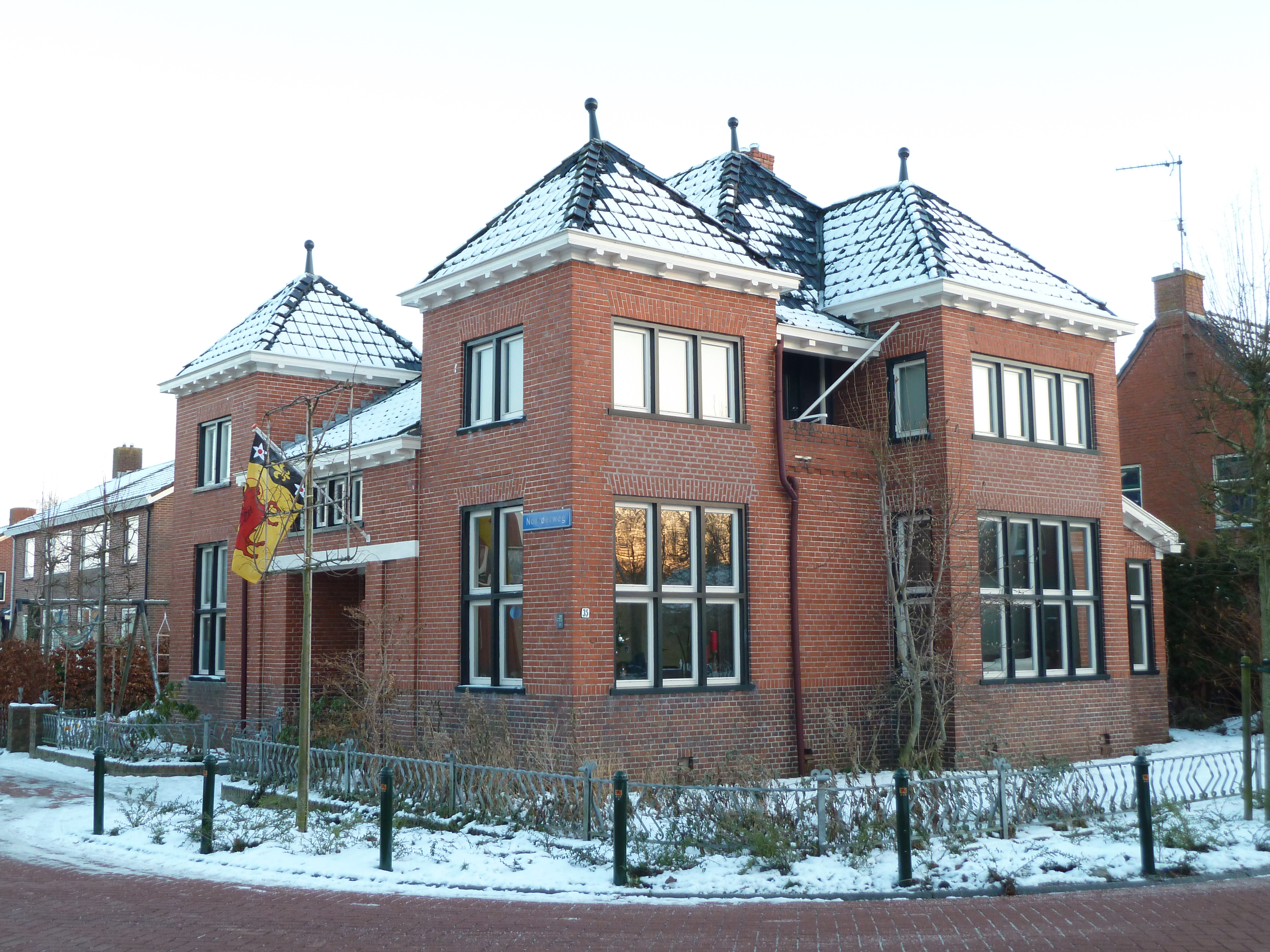
Presbytery across the reformed church

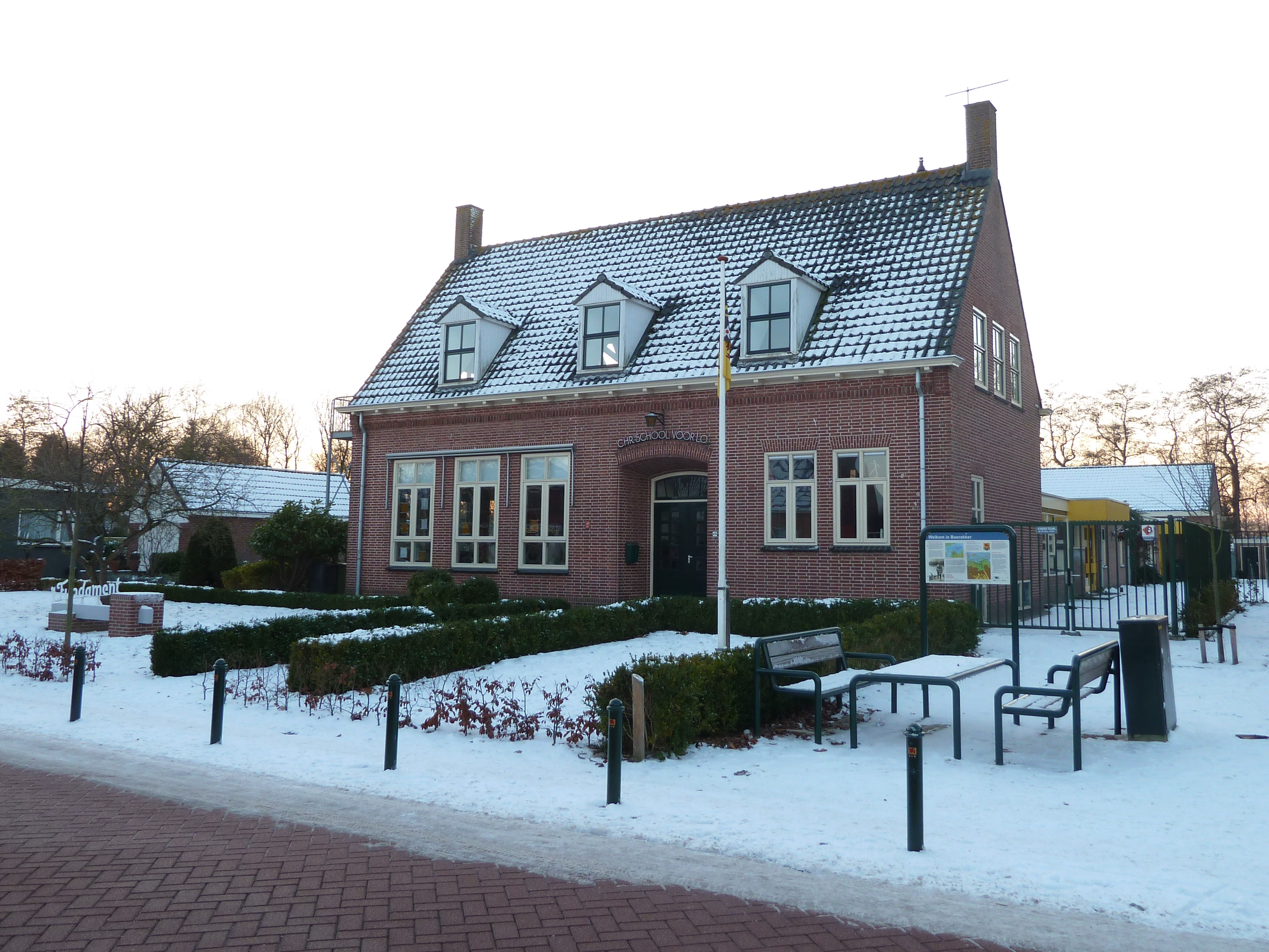
Primary school
