= Aafje Looijenga-Vos =

Dutch crystallographer and professor (1928–2018)

Aafje Looijenga-Vos (29 April 1928 in Marum – 4 November 2018 in Amersfoort) was a Dutch crystallographer. She was a professor for general chemistry and later for structural chemistry at the University of Groningen.

== Life ==
She studied chemistry at the University of Groningen from 1946 to 1952. Already in 1948, she met other crystallographers during the first Congress of the International Union of Crystallography (IUCr). In 1952, she started her PhD in the group of the Eelco Wiebenga. Her PhD thesis dealt with the structures of P_{4}S_{10} and P_{4}S_{7} and was named "De kristalstructuur van P_{4}S_{10} and P_{4}S_{7} ". She defended the thesis in 1955. The first two years after defending her thesis, she worked at UK crystallographic institutions (Glasgow, Leeds, Oxford, and Cambridge), where she also worked with Dorothy Hodgkin. In 1962, she became a professor for general chemistry and, in 1967, she became a professor of structural chemistry at the University of Groningen. She was the secretary of the IUCr Commission on the International Tables and was involved in realising the 1983 edition of Volume A of the International Tables for Crystallography. In 1982, she married Hans Looijenga, a widower with eight children. She was survived by 21 grandchildren and 4 great-grandchildren.

== Research ==
Together with Philip Coppens, she performed neutron diffraction experiments on cyanuric acid crystals. She also worked on direct methods together with Isabella Karle. She was also involved in the development of the CAD-4, the Computer Automated Diffractometer with 4 circles. Furthermore, her research dealt with the following topics: cyclophosphazenes, electron-density distribution studies based on high-resolution data at low temperature, and relations between structure and both electrical and magnetic properties of morpholinium-TCNQ compounds.

== Selected publications ==
- Aafje Vos (1955). De Kristalstructuur van P4S10 en P4S7. W.J.E. Tjeenk Willink.
- Wiebenga, E. H.; Vos, A. (1955-04-10). "The crystal structures of P4S10 and P4S7". Acta Crystallographica. 8 (4): 217–223. Bibcode:1955AcCry...8..217V. doi:10.1107/S0365110X5500073X. ISSN 0365-110X.
- Looijenga-Vos, Aafje (1993). "Herinneringen aan de kristalchemie". Werken aan scheikunde, 24 memoires van hen die de Nederlandse Chemie deze eeuw groot hebben gemaakt (PDF). Delft: Delftse Universitaire Pers. pp. 443–464.
- Vos, A.; Meertens, P.; Hoekstra, A. (1975-12-15). "Refinement of the crystal structure of trans-stilbene (TSB). The molecular structure in the crystalline and gaseous phases". Acta Crystallographica Section B. 31 (12): 2813–2817. Bibcode:1975AcCrB..31.2813H. doi:10.1107/S0567740875008953. ISSN 0567-7408.
- Vos, A.; Migchelsen, T.; Hazekamp, R. (1962-06-10). "Refinement of the structure of metastable phosphonitrilic chloride, (PNCl2)4". Acta Crystallographica. 15 (6): 539–543. Bibcode:1962AcCry..15..539H. doi:10.1107/S0365110X62001395. ISSN 0365-110X.
- Looyenga-Vos, A. (1988). "Levensbericht G. Hägg". Jaarboek (PDF). Amsterdam. pp. 126–131.
- Looyenga-Vos, A. (1999). "Levensbericht P.M. de Wolff". Levensberichten en herdenkingen (PDF). Amsterdam. pp. 51–56.
- Looyenga-Vos, A. (1993). "Levensbericht C.H. MacGillavry". Levensberichten en herdenkingen (PDF). Amsterdam. pp. 53–59.
- Drenth, J.; Looyenga-Vos, A. (1995). "Levensbericht D.M.C. Crowfoot Hodgkin". Levensberichten en herdenkingen (PDF). Amsterdam. pp. 23–28.

== Awards ==
Since 1980, she was a member of the Royal Netherlands Academy of Arts and Sciences.
