= Andrea Deelstra =

Dutch long-distance runner

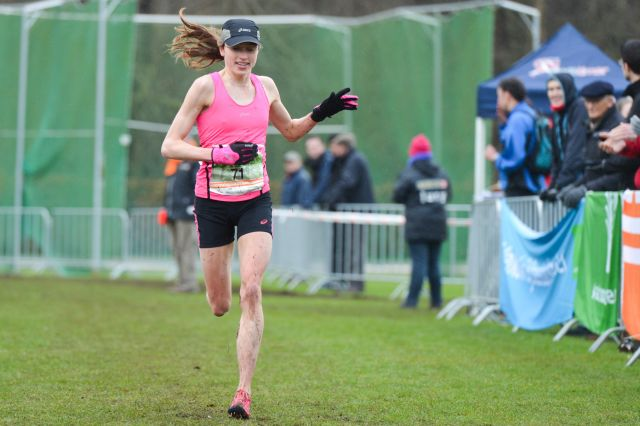
Andrea Deelstra 2015

Andrea Deelstra (born 6 March 1985, in Niebert) is a Dutch long-distance runner.

Deelstra finished fifth at the 2015 Berlin Marathon and this finish qualified her for the 2016 Olympics.
