= Marum =

- Town and former municipality
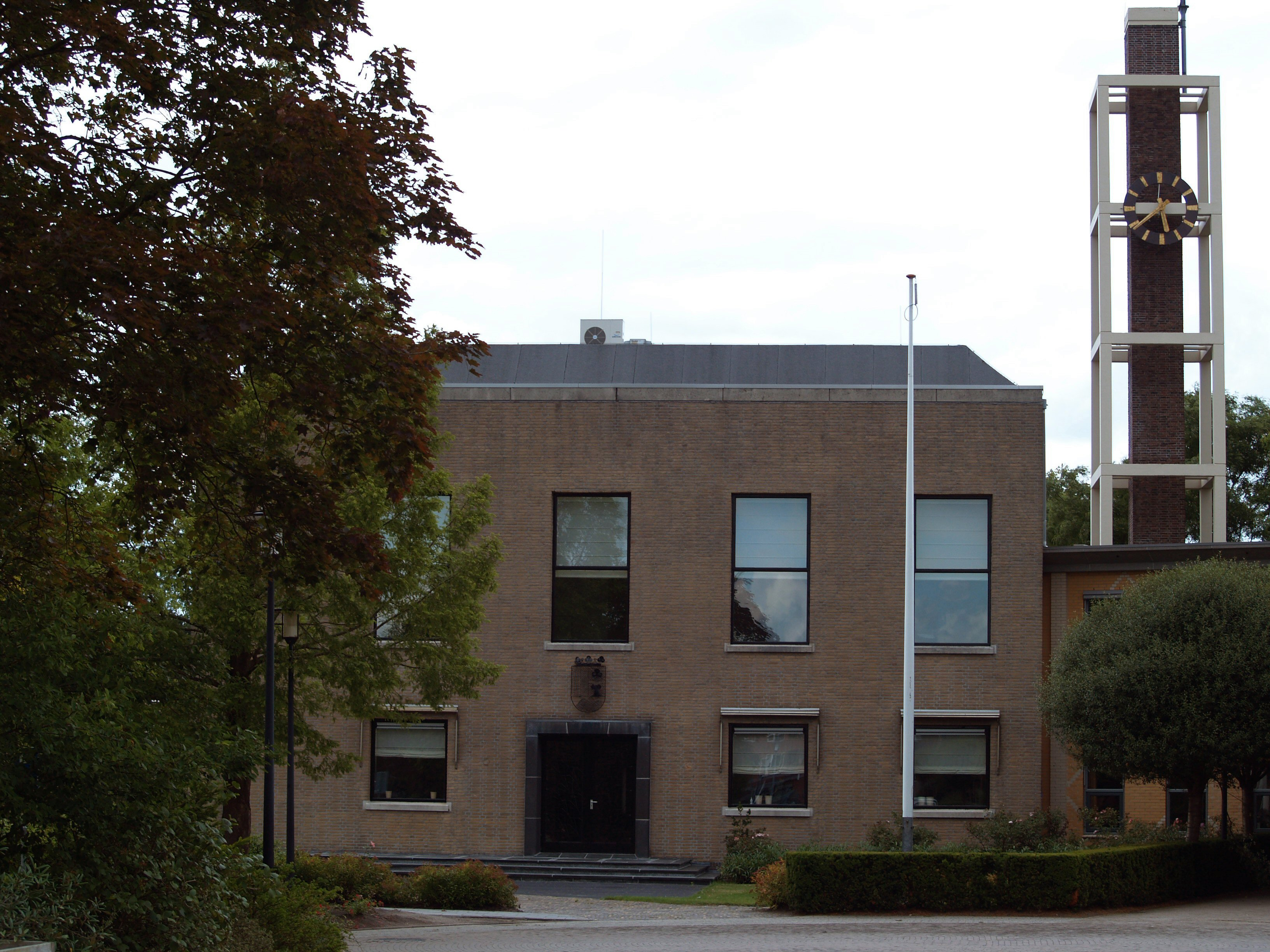
- Marum town hall

- Flag Coat of arms

- Location in Groningen

- Location in the province of Groningen in the Netherlands Marum (Netherlands)
- Coordinates: 53°9′N 6°16′E
- Country: Netherlands
- Province: Groningen
- Municipality: Westerkwartier
- Merged: 2019

Area
  - Total: 43.58 km^{2} (16.83 sq mi)
- Elevation: 3 m (9.8 ft)

Population (2021)
  - Total: 8,125
  - Density: 186.4/km^{2} (482.9/sq mi)
- Time zone: UTC+1 (CET)
  - Summer (DST): UTC+2 (CEST)
- Postcode: 9363
- Area code: 0594

Marum (Dutch pronunciation: [ˈmaːrʏm]) is a town and a former municipality in the northeastern Netherlands. The municipality was merged into the municipality of Westerkwartier on 1 January 2019.

== History ==
Marum is located in the peat area, and was an agricultural village. It was first mentioned in 1385 and probably means village near the lake. In 1795, it was home to 351 people.

Marum started to industrialise in the early 20th century, the tram from Groningen to Drachten resulted in further growth. The construction of the A7 motorway has resulted in the development of a suburban town. In 2019, it ceased to be an independent municipality and was merged into Westerkwartier.

== Former population centres ==
Boerakker, Jonkersvaart, Lucaswolde, Marum, Niebert, Noordwijk, Nuis, De Wilp.

== Notable people ==
- Tjeerd van Dekken (born 1967), politician
- Aafje Looijenga-Vos (1928–2018), crystallographer

== Gallery ==
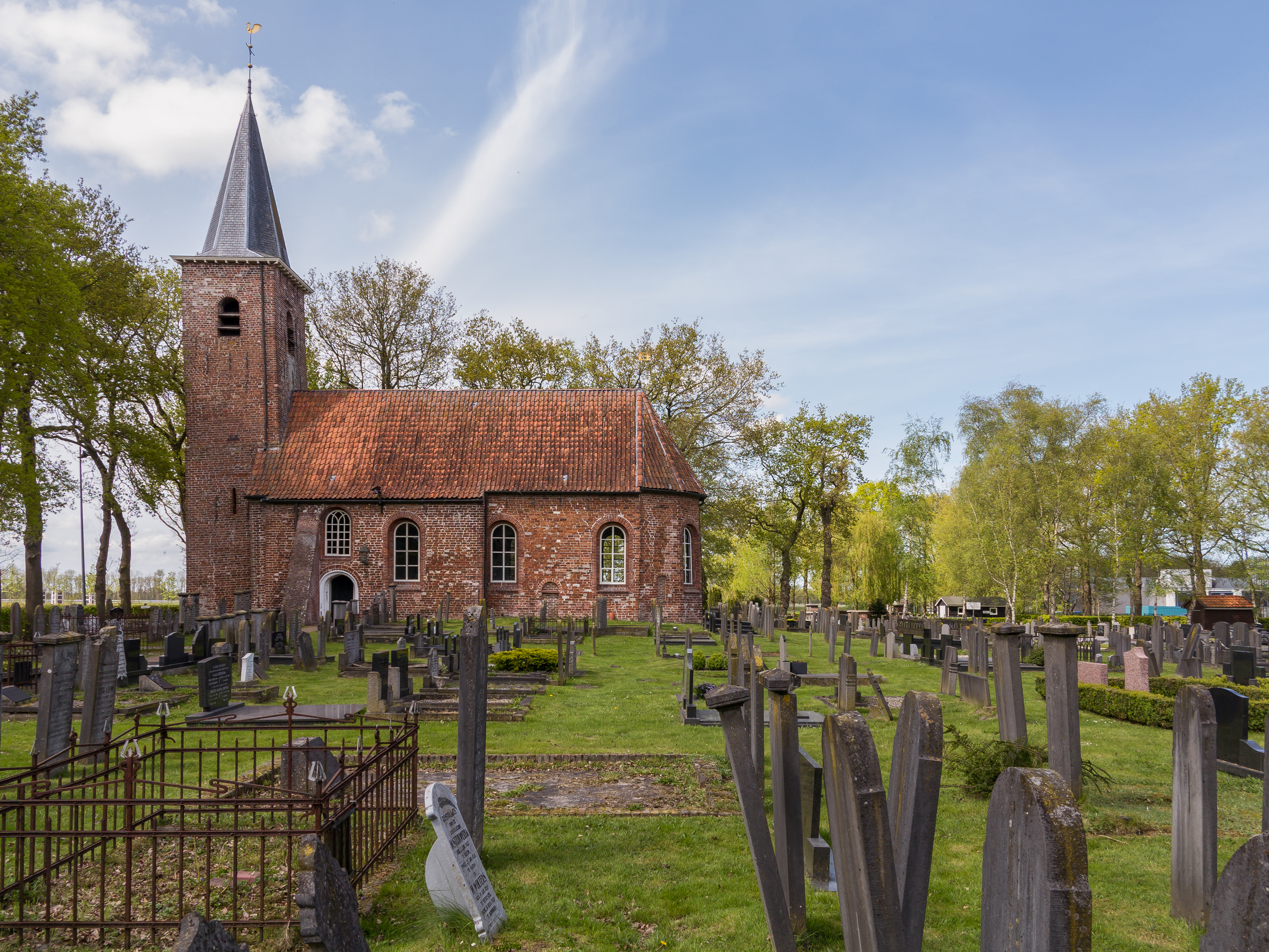
Marum, reformed church

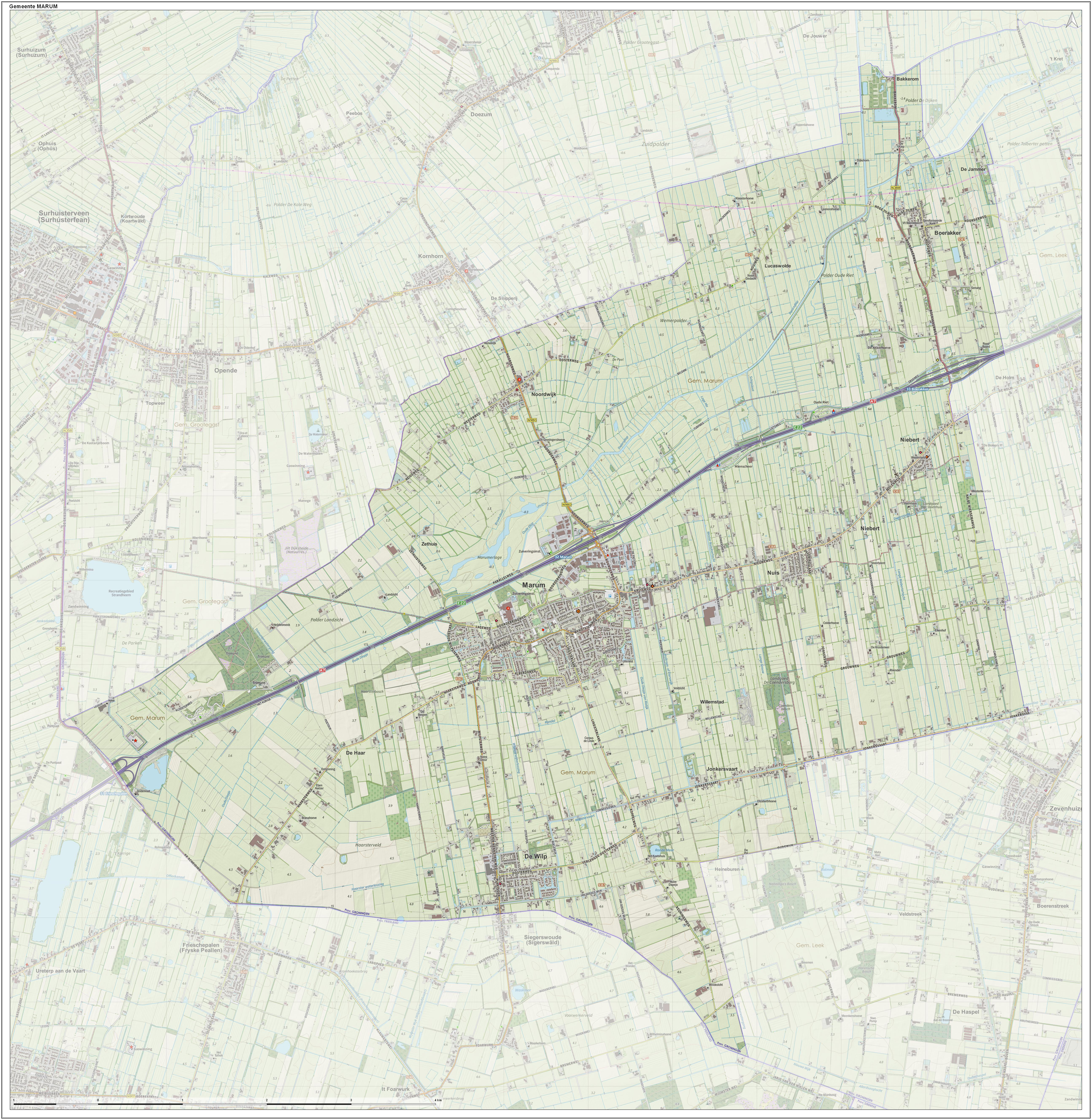
Dutch Topographic map of the municipality of Marum, June 2015

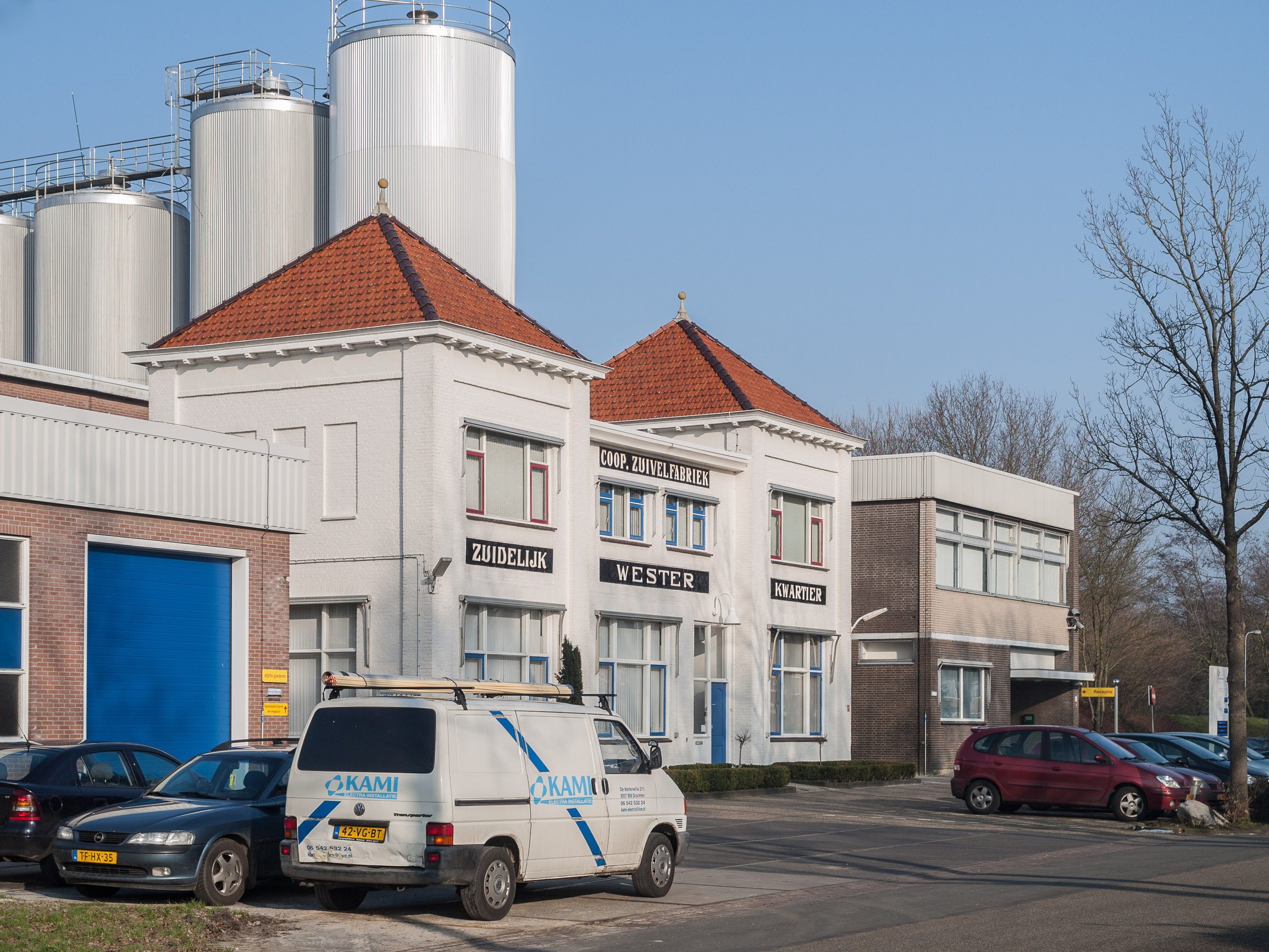
Dairy factory

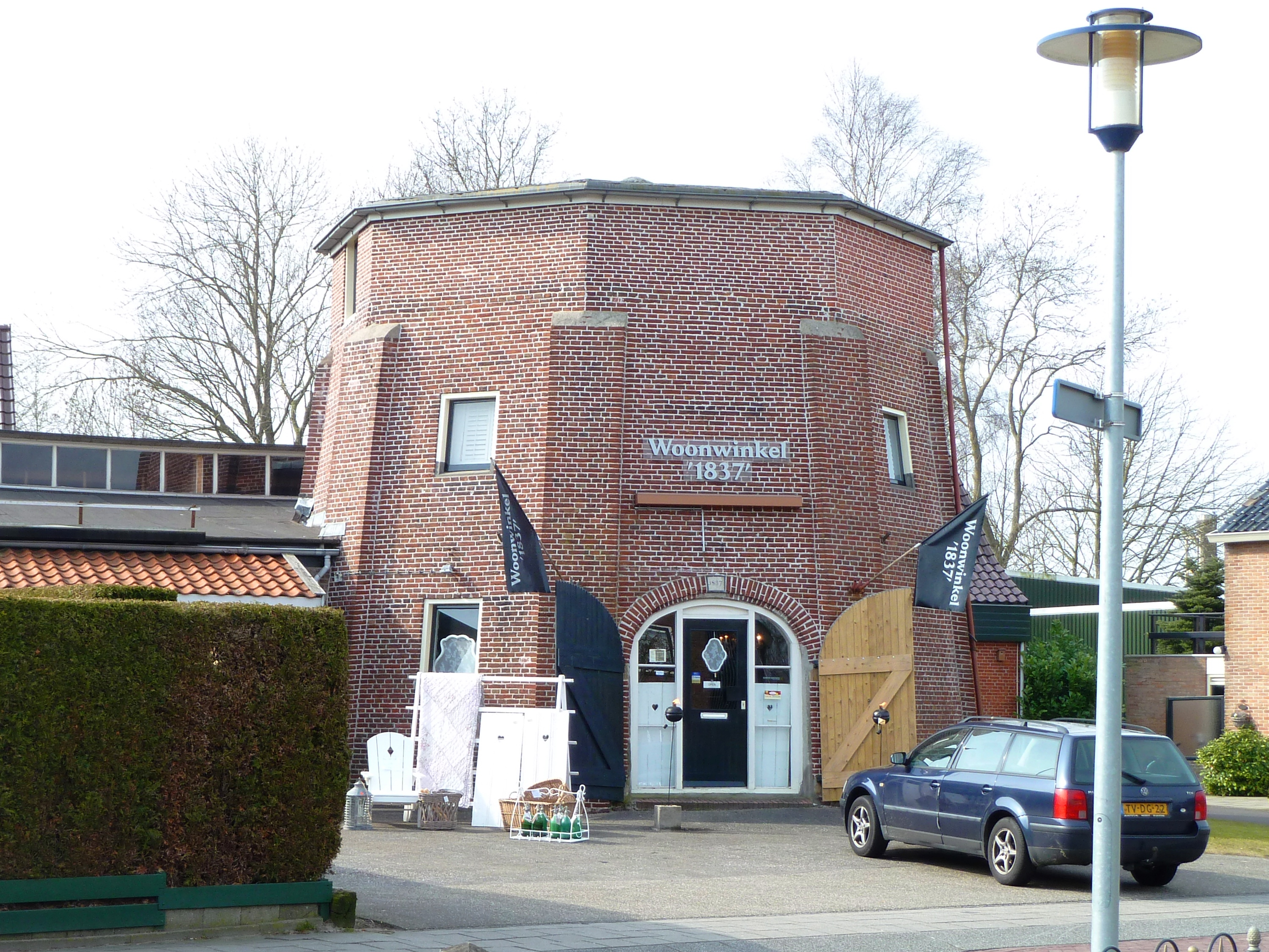
Base of a former windmill
