= Noordwijk, Groningen =

Noordwijk Noordwiek (Gronings)
- Village
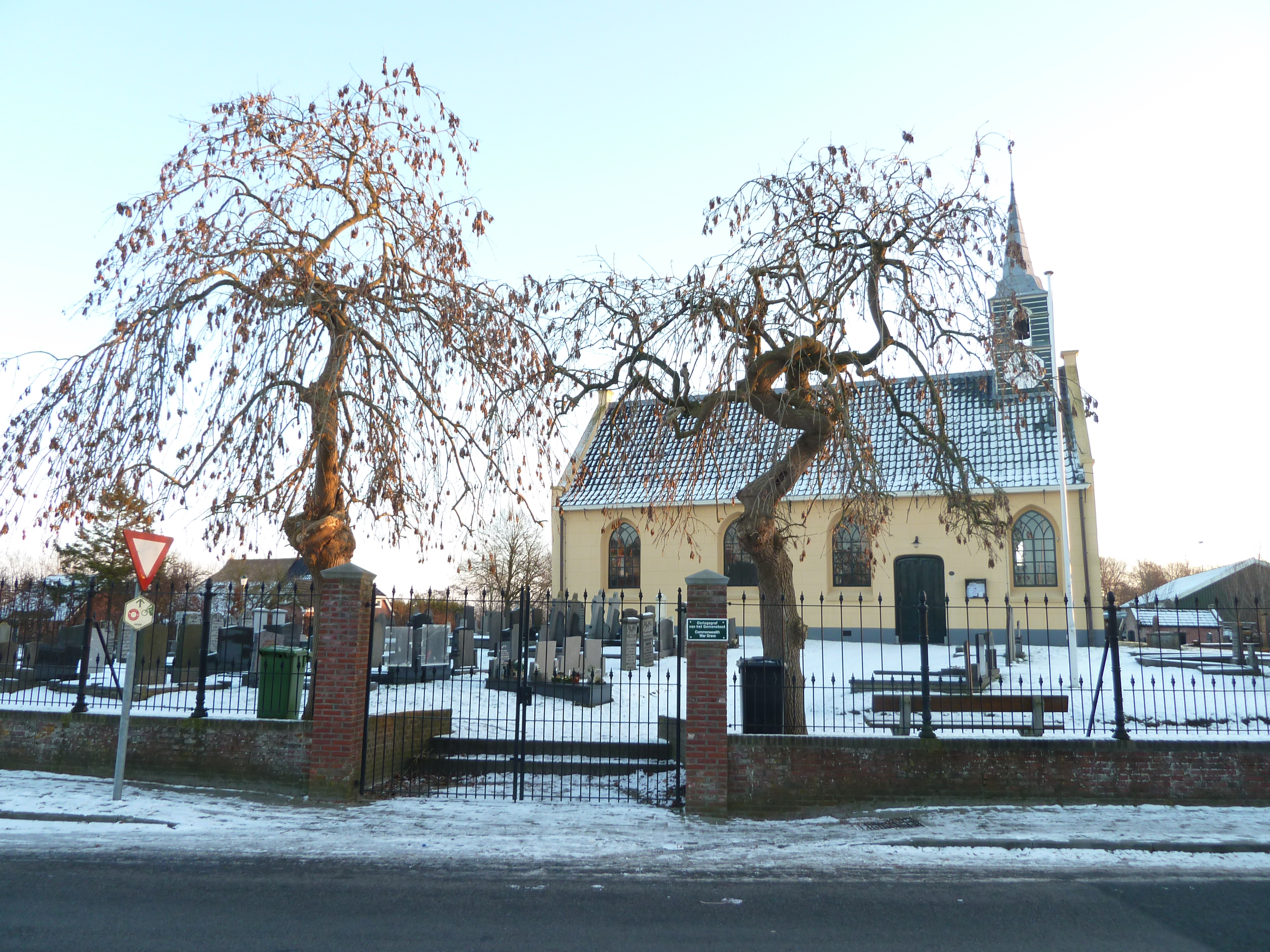
- Protestant church in 2010

- Coat of arms

- Location of Noordwijk in the province of Groningen Noordwijk (Netherlands)
- Coordinates: 53°10′11″N 6°15′24″E
- Country: Netherlands
- Province: Groningen
- Municipality: Westerkwartier

Area
  - Total: 0.36 km^{2} (0.14 sq mi)
- Elevation: 1.8 m (5.9 ft)

Population (2021)
  - Total: 225
  - Density: 630/km^{2} (1,600/sq mi)
- Time zone: UTC+1 (CET)
  - Summer (DST): UTC+2 (CEST)
- Postal code: 9824
- Dialing code: 0594

Noordwijk (Dutch: [ˈnoːrtʋɛik]; Gronings: Noordwiek) is a small village in the municipality of Westerkwartier, in the province of Groningen in the Netherlands, about three km north of the town of Marum. Until 2019, it was part of the municipality of Marum. As of 2021, it had a population of 225.

The name Noordwijk is said to have been derived from a neighborhood north of Marum. Noordwijk is located at a junction whose street names indicate the direction: Noorderweg, Westerweg and Oosterweg.

The church of Noordwijk dates from the early fourteenth century. The church is now owned by the Stichting Oude Groninger Kerken ('Old Groninger Churches Foundation') and has recently been restored. The Leedaanzeggerspad runs from the mortuary behind the church, a walk during which the history of the village in the nineteenth century is discussed.

== Gallery ==
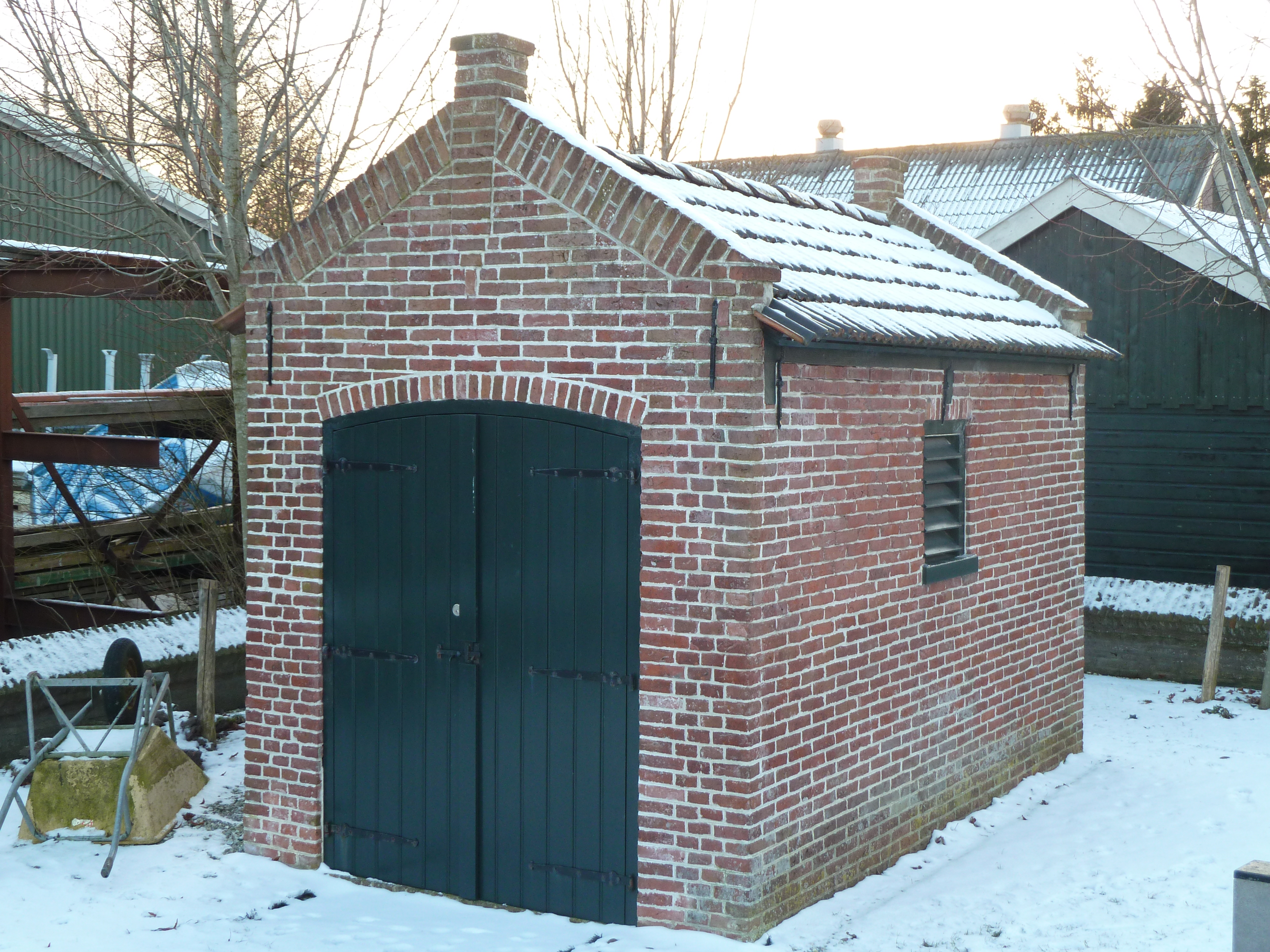
Mortuary behind the church

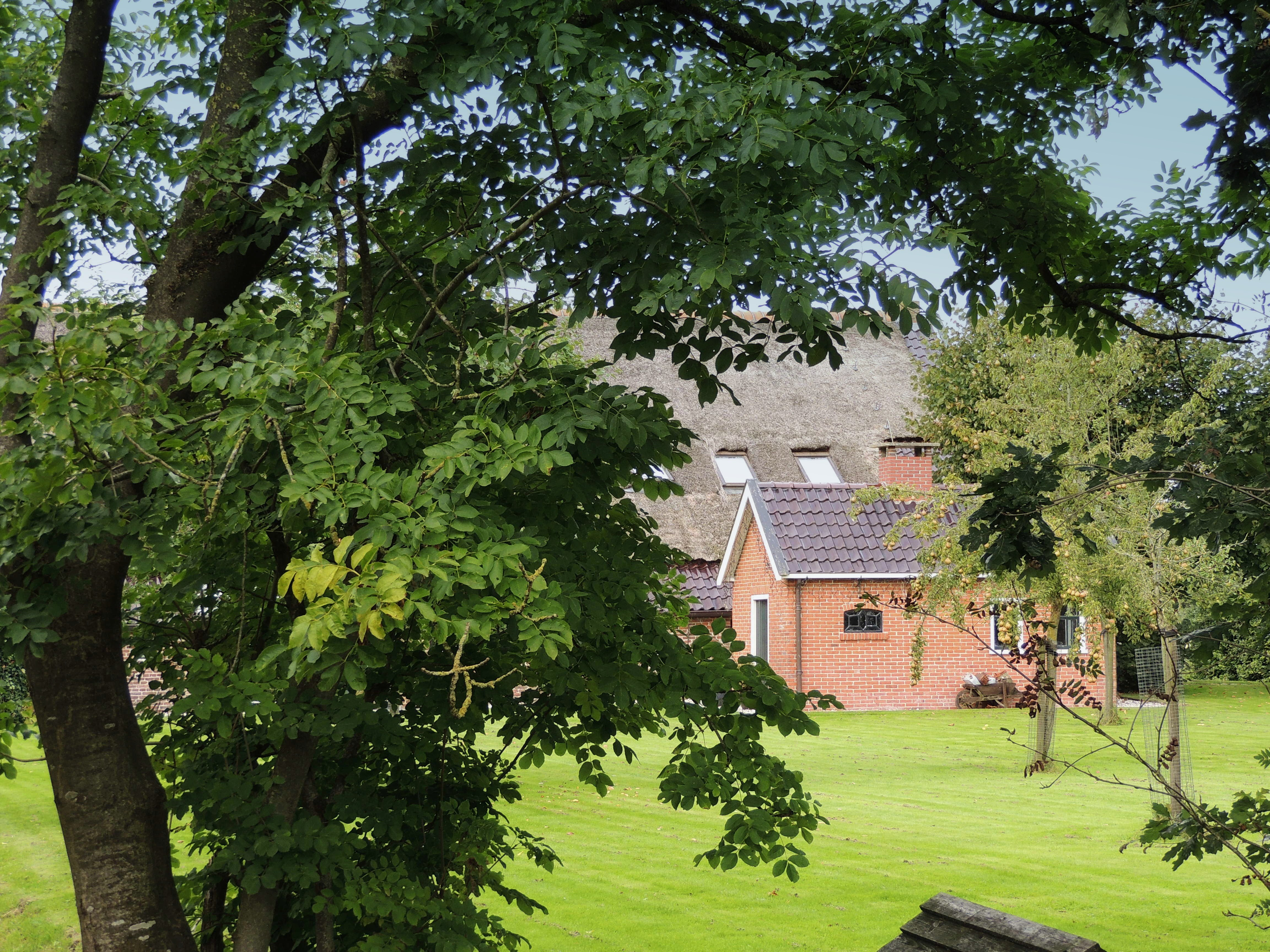
Farm near Noordwijk

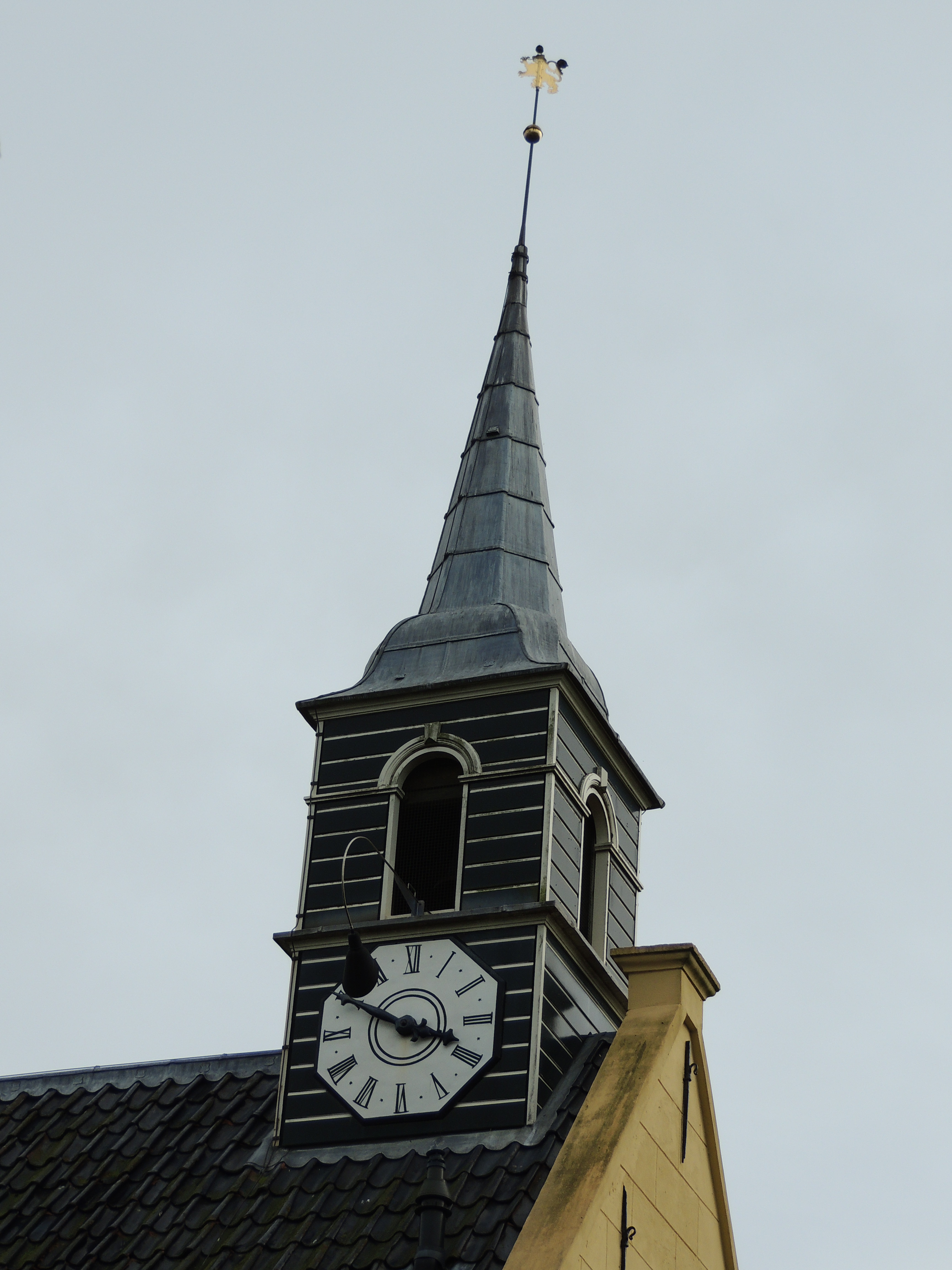
Close-up of the church's belltower
