= De Wilp =

- Village
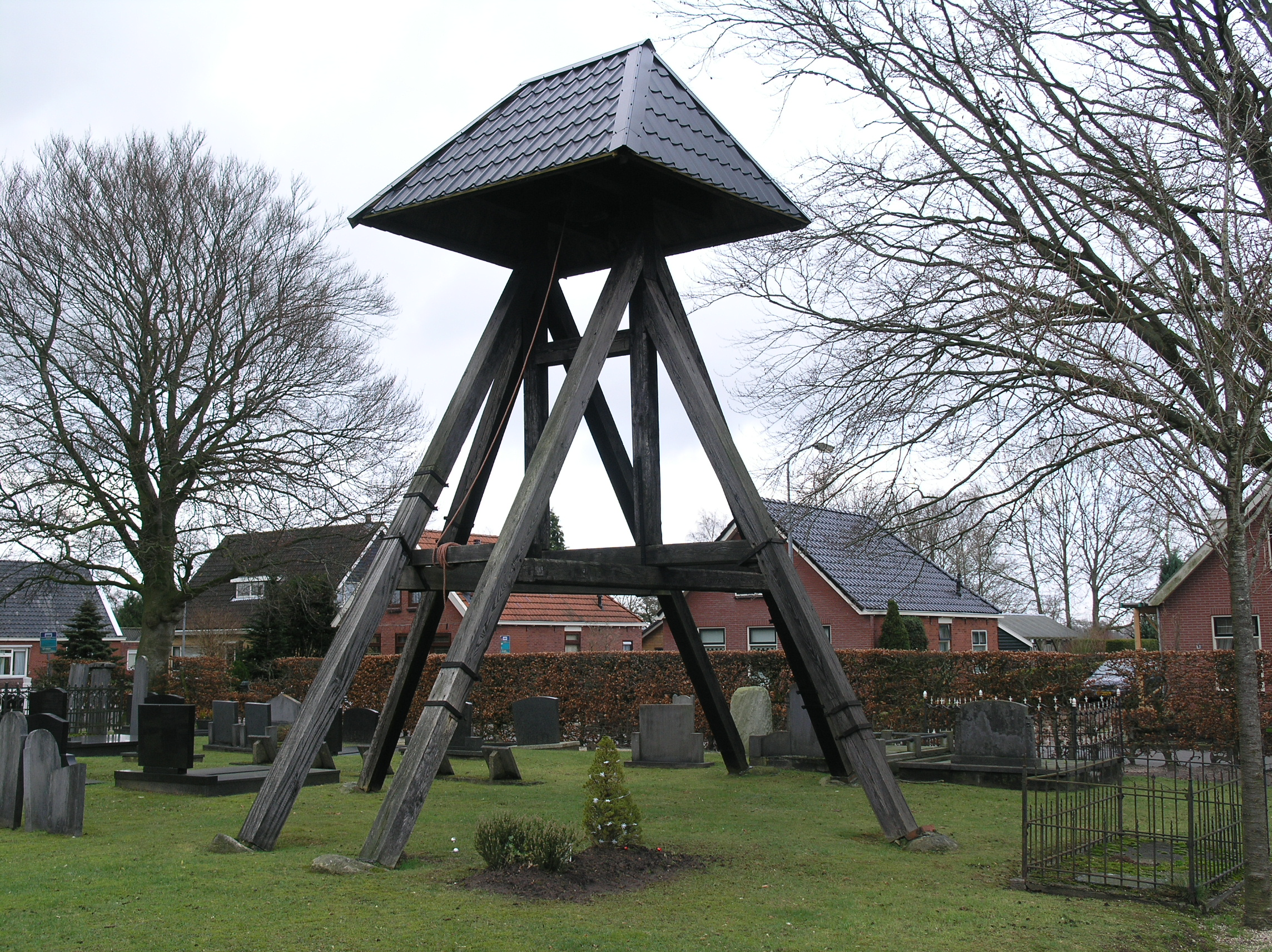
- Wooden bell tower in 2007

- Coat of arms

- Location of De Wilp in the province of Groningen De Wilp (Netherlands)
- Coordinates: 53°7′6″N 6°15′21″E
- Country: Netherlands
- Province: Groningen
- Municipality: Westerkwartier

Area
  - Total: 21.31 km^{2} (8.23 sq mi)
- Elevation: 5 m (16 ft)

Population (2021)
  - Total: 2,330
  - Density: 109/km^{2} (283/sq mi)
- Time zone: UTC+1 (CET)
  - Summer (DST): UTC+2 (CEST)
- Postal code: 9367
- Dialing code: 0594

De Wilp (West Frisian: De Wylp) is a village in the Netherlands south of the town of Marum. It is largely located in the municipality of Westerkwartier in the province of Groningen, but a few houses of the village are in the municipality of Opsterland in the province of Friesland.

The village was founded by labourers from Friesland; a part of the population still speaks West Frisian.

== History ==
The area around De Wilp was a raised bog which formed the boundary between the province of Friesland and Groningen. The border was not defined, because it contained swamps and heaths with few inhabitants. In the late-18 century, the Company of Drachten started exploiting the peat. The labour force mainly came from Friesland. A linear settlement appeared along the canal, and was named De Wilp after a sign with a Eurasian curlew (Wylp in Frisian) of a local tavern. The border was defined later, and the Frisian side of the village is in Siegerswoude. The village was first mentioned in 1828.

The peat workers were joined by small farmers. In 1838, a school was founded, and in 1868, the Dutch Reformed Church was built. In 1840, the population was 482 people and 142 in Siegerwoude. De Wilp has an active village community which organises many events and is home to several sports organisation. In 2018, it became part of the municipality of Westerkwartier.
