= Westerkwartier =

Region in Groningen, The Netherlands

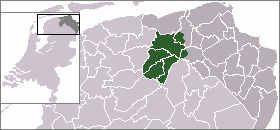
Location of the Westerkwartier in the province Groningen

The Westerkwartier (Dutch pronunciation: [ˈʋɛstərkʋɑrˌtiːr]; Gronings: Westerkertaaier; West Frisian: Westerkertier; English: Western Quarter) is a historical region in the Dutch province of Groningen, at the border with the provinces of Drenthe and Friesland. In the past the area was part of the historical region of Frisia. The West Frisian language is still spoken in the western parts of the area (the villages Marum, De Wilp and Opende). In the rest of the Westerkwartier, "Westerkertiersk", a local variant of Low Saxon, is spoken.

The biggest town in the Westerkwartier is Leek.

At January 1, 2019, the four municipalities Leek, Zuidhorn, Marum, and Grootegast have merged to become the municipality of Westerkwartier. Also the villages Garnwerd, Feerwerd and Ezinge (municipality of Winsum) have been added to this new municipality.
