= Jonkersvaart =

Jonkersvaart Jonkersvoart (Gronings)
- Village
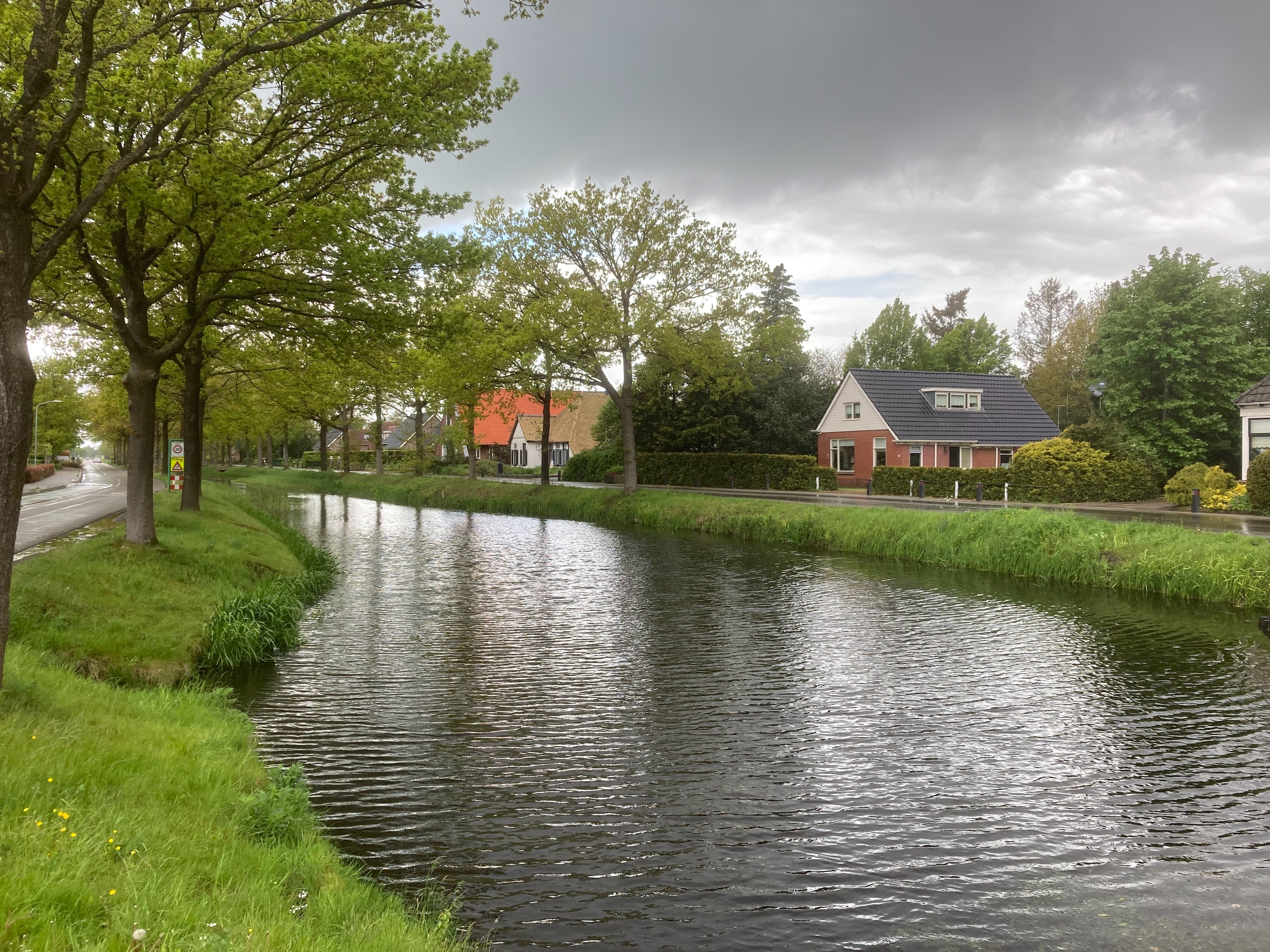
- View of Jonkersvaart

- Flag Coat of arms

- Location in the province of Groningen in the Netherlands Jonkersvaart (Netherlands)
- Coordinates: 53°8′N 6°18′E
- Country: Netherlands
- Province: Groningen
- Municipality: Westerkwartier

Area
  - Total: 8.41 km^{2} (3.25 sq mi)
- Elevation: 4.8 m (16 ft)

Population (2021)
  - Total: 225
  - Density: 26.8/km^{2} (69.3/sq mi)
- Time zone: UTC+1 (CET)
  - Summer (DST): UTC+2 (CEST)
- Postcode: 9366
- Area code: 0594
- Website: jonkersvaart.com

Jonkersvaart (Dutch: [ˈjɔŋkərsˌfaːrt]; Gronings: Jonkersvoart) is a linear village in the municipality of Westerkwartier in the province of Groningen in the Netherlands. As of 2021, it had a population of 225.

== History ==
Already in 1765, there was mention of the Jonkersgruppel, a waterway for the drainage of water during peat extraction. Around 1780, peat extraction received a new impulse under squire Ferdinand Folef von Innhausen und Kniphausen (1735-1795) and his wife Anna Maria Graafland, who had a navigable canal built. The canal and the village owe their name to this squire. The Gravelandwijk is named after Anna Maria Graafland, a neighborhood that is connected to the Jonkersvaart via the Zandwijk.

In 1871, a connection with Friesland was made via the Wilpstervaart. The Jonkersverlaat was constructed for this purpose.

== Gallery ==
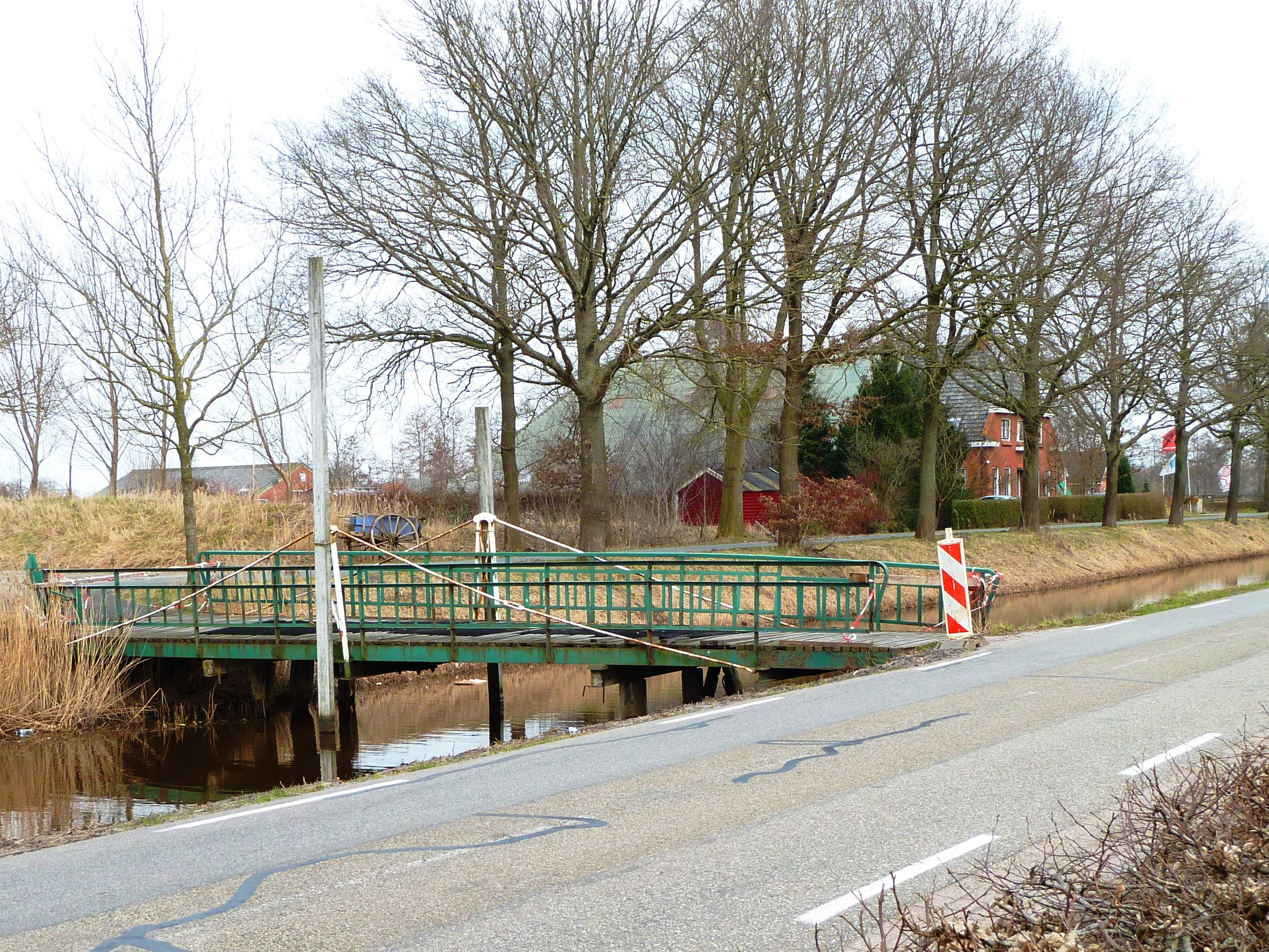
Old bridge in Jonkersvaart

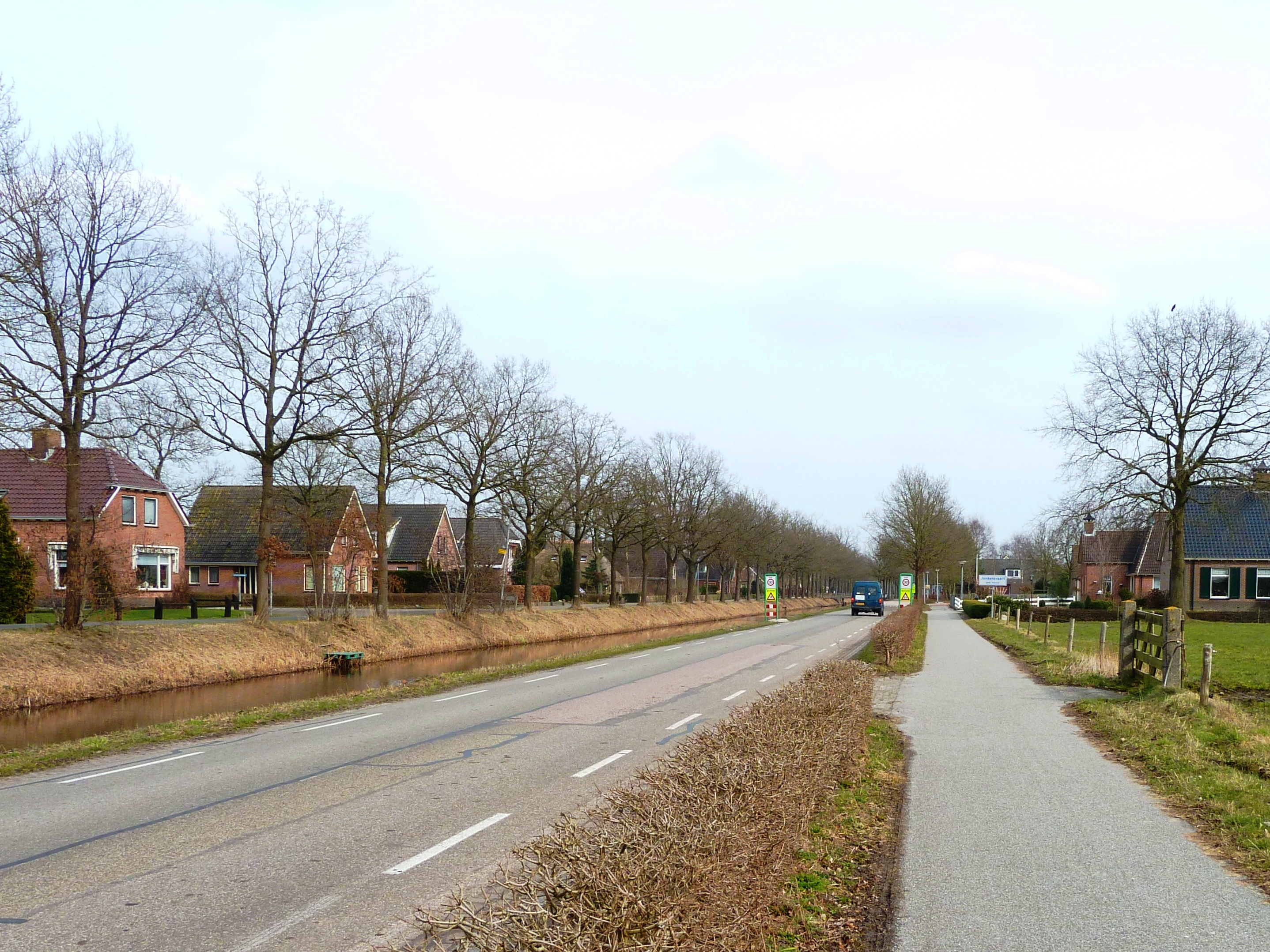
Entrance to the village

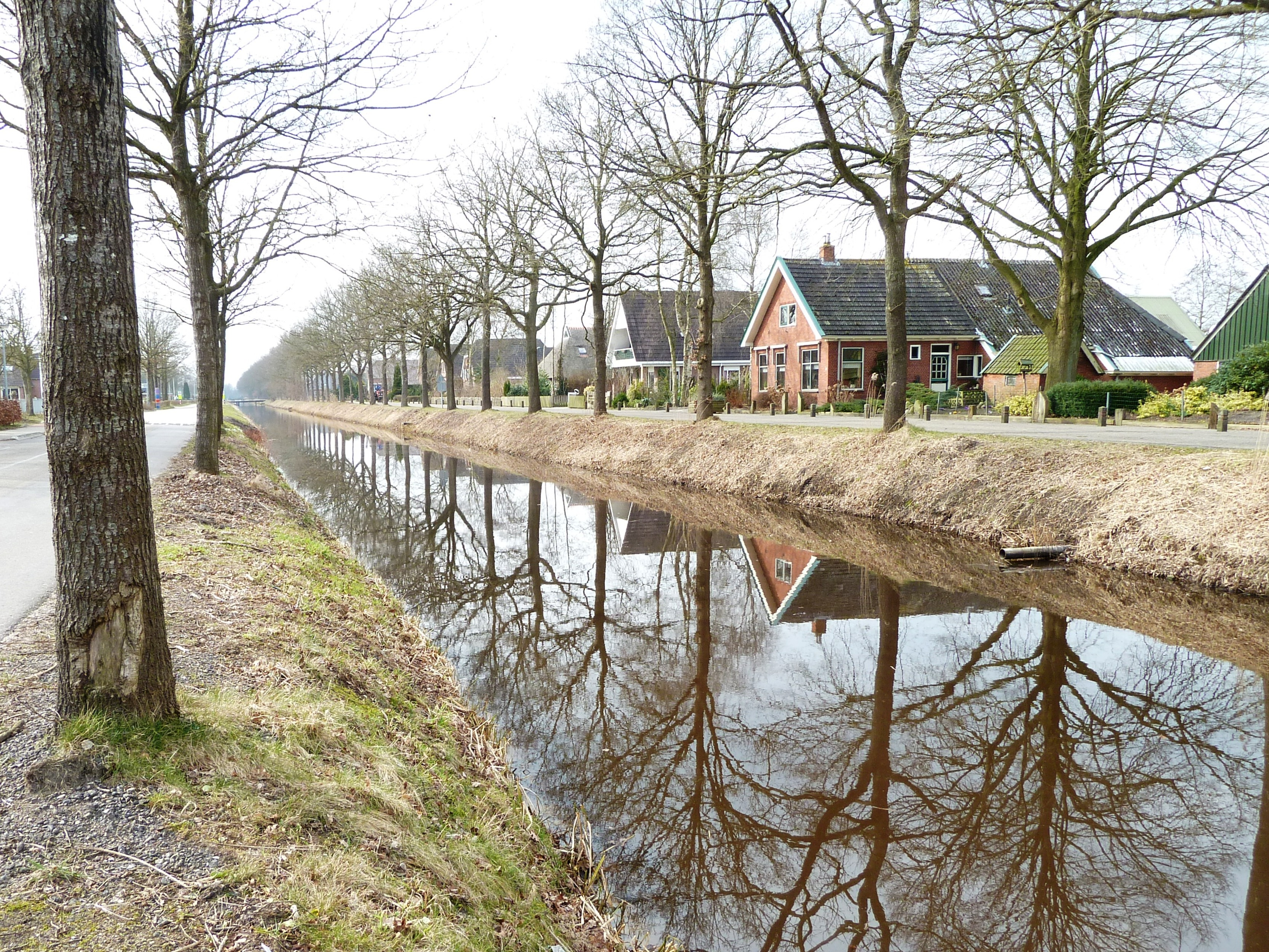
Houses along the water
