= Glossary of stock market terms =

Following is a glossary of stock market terms.

- All or none or AON: in investment banking or securities transactions, "an order to buy or sell a stock that must be executed in its entirely, or not executed at all".
- Ask price or Ask: the lowest price a seller of a stock is willing to accept for a share of that given stock.
- Bear market: a general decline in the stock market over a period of time. See Market trend.
- Bookrunner: in investment banking, usually the main underwriter or lead-manager/arranger/coordinator in equity, debt, or hybrid securities issuances.
- Bull market: a period of generally rising prices. See Market trend.
- Closing print: a report of the final prices for the day on a stock exchange.
- Fill or kill or FOK: "an order to buy or sell a stock that must be executed immediately"—a few seconds, customarily—in its entirety; otherwise, the entire order is cancelled; no partial fulfillments are allowed.
- Green sheet: a document that accompanies a prospectus for most initial public offerings, and describes the basic terms of the offering that are of the most important to a registered representative.
- Greenshoe: A special arrangement in a share offering, for example an IPO, which enables the investment bank representing the underwriters to support the share price after the offering without putting their own capital at risk.
  - Reverse greenshoe: a special provision in an IPO prospectus, which allows underwriters to sell shares back to the issuer.
- Immediate or cancel, IOC, or accept order: "an order to buy or sell a stock that must be executed immediately"; if the entire order is not available at that moment for purchase a partial fulfillment is possible, but any portion of an IOC order that cannot be filled immediately is cancelled, eliminating the need for manual cancellation.
- Initial public offering or IPO: a type of public offering in which shares of a company are sold to institutional investors.
- Institutional investor: an entity which pools money to purchase securities, real property, and other investment assets or originate loans.
- Market top: the highest point of trading before the market shifts from a bull market to a bear market.
- Market trend: the tendency of financial markets to move in a particular direction over time.
- Public float or Free float: the portion of shares of a corporation that are in the hands of public investors as opposed to locked-in stock held by promoters, company officers, controlling-interest investors, or government.
- Pump and dump or P&D: a form of securities fraud that involves artificially inflating the price of an owned stock through false and misleading positive statements, in order to sell the cheaply purchased stock at a higher price.
- Runoff or run-off: the period at the end of a stock market trading session originally reserved for printing end-of-trading share prices and values onto ticker tape; now used to describe trades at the end of a session that may not be announced or reported until the start of the next session.
- Securities special settlement: special settlement procedures that include the mechanisms to extinguish obligations stemming from unfulfilled obligations on their settlement date.
- Stub: the stock representing the remaining equity in a corporation left over after a major cash or security distribution from a buyout, a spin-out, a demerger or some other form of restructuring removes most of the company's operations from the parent corporation.
- Theoretical ex-rights price: a situation where the stock and the right attached to the stock is separated.
- Trade: the buying and selling of financial instruments.
- Two-tier tender offer: an offer to purchase a sufficient number of stockholders' shares so as to gain effective control of a firm at a certain price per share, followed by a lower offer at a later date for the remaining shares.
- Variable prepaid forward contract: an investment strategy that allows a shareholder with a concentrated stock holding to generate liquidity for diversification or other purposes.
- Widow-and-orphan stock: a stock that reliably provides a regular dividend while also yielding a slow but steady rise in market value over the long term.
- Witching hour: the last hour of stock trading between 3 pm (when the bond market closes) and 4 pm EST (when the stock market closes), which can be characterized by higher-than-average volatility.
  - Triple witching hour: the last hour of the stock market trading session (3:00-4:00 P.M., New York City local Time) on the third Friday of every March, June, September, and December, when three kinds of securities expire - stock market index futures, stock market index options, and stock options.
- Yellow strip price or Touch price: in the UK stock market (LSE), the highest bid price or lowest offer price, shown on the SEAQ or SETS screen in a yellow strip.
