= Feerwerd =

Feerwerd Fiwwerd (Gronings)
- Village
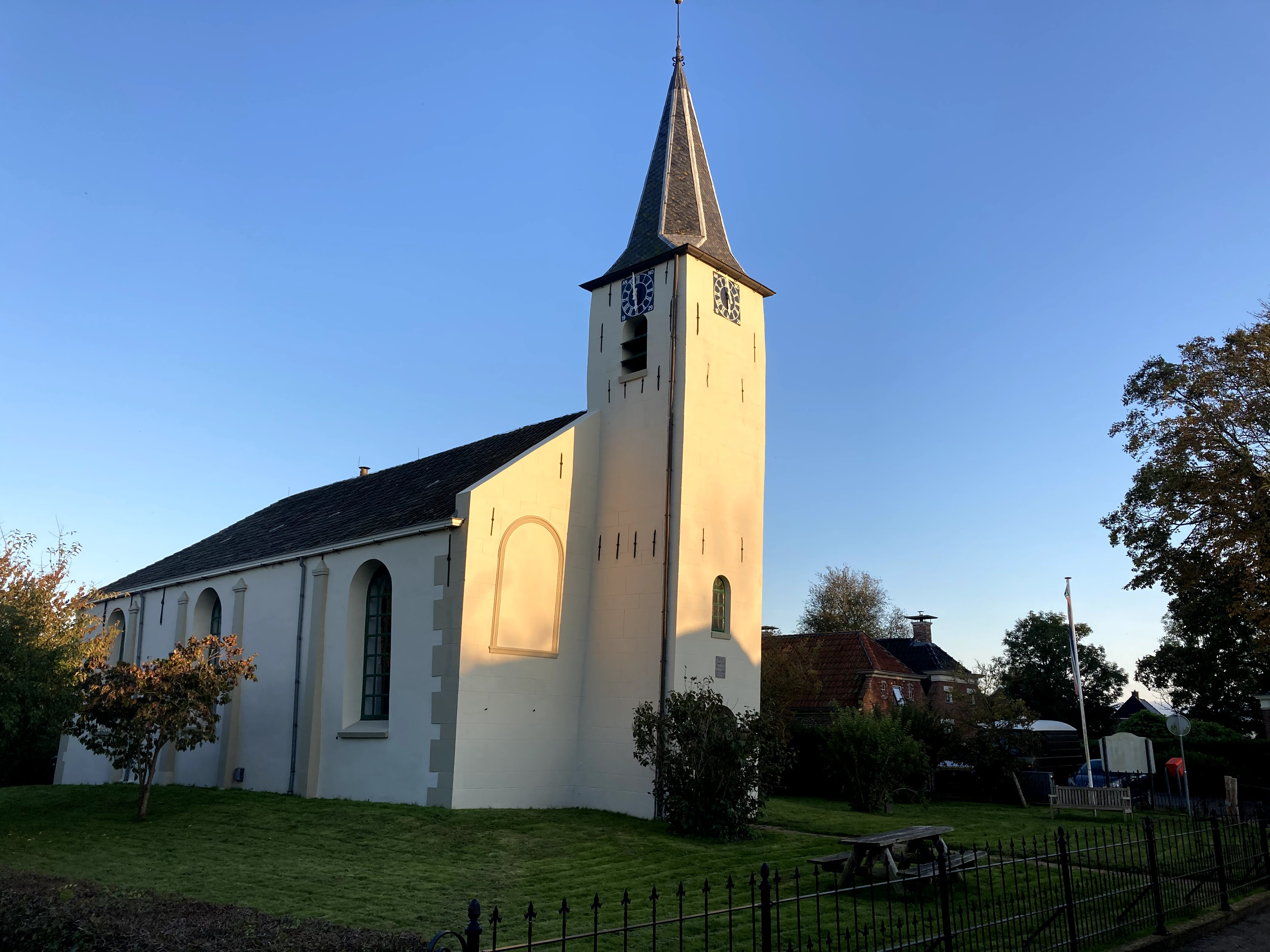
- Church of Feerwerd

- Location in the province of Groningen in the Netherlands Feerwerd (Netherlands)
- Coordinates: 53°18′N 6°28′E
- Country: Netherlands
- Province: Groningen
- Municipality: Westerkwartier

Area
  - Total: 0.18 km^{2} (0.069 sq mi)
- Elevation: 1.8 m (5.9 ft)

Population (2021)
  - Total: 520
  - Density: 2,900/km^{2} (7,500/sq mi)
- Time zone: UTC+1 (CET)
  - Summer (DST): UTC+2 (CEST)
- Postcode: 9892
- Area code: 0594
- Website: www.feerwerd.com

Feerwerd (Dutch: [ˈfeːrʋərt]; Gronings: Fiwwerd) is a village in the municipality of Westerkwartier in the province of Groningen in the Netherlands. As of 2021, Feerwerd had a population of 520.

== Geography ==
Feerwerd is a small village in the Middag region, between Ezinge, Garnwerd, and Aduarderzijl. The village is located on a double wierde, which is intersected by the Oldehoofsch canal. Most of the houses are located north of this canal and mainly date from the end of the 19th and the beginning of the 20th century. These closely spaced brick houses with their corresponding roofs along Valgeweg, Aldringaweg, and Oosterweg together form the compact old village centre. The entire village has been designated as a protected villagescape.

Around the village are several hamlets that fall under the village. Four of these are located along the Aduarderdiep to the east of the village. From north to south, these are Aduarderzijl, Schifpot, Bolshuizen, and Brillerij. In the low-lying older Feerwerdermeeden to the south of the village are the hamlets of Beswerd and Joeswerd, which until 1900 fell under the neighboring village of Garnwerd, but are still part of that village ecclesiastically. Northwest of the village is the Lucaspad ('Lucas' Path'), the old road connection to Ezinge, which was improved into a cycle path in the 1930s by order of the then mayor of Ezinge, Lucas Wildervanck de Blécourt. To the west of the village are remnants of the stream bed of the former Middagster Riet, which was part of the Peizerdiep, but gradually silted up after the breakthrough of the Kliefsloot around 800 AD.

=== Transport ===
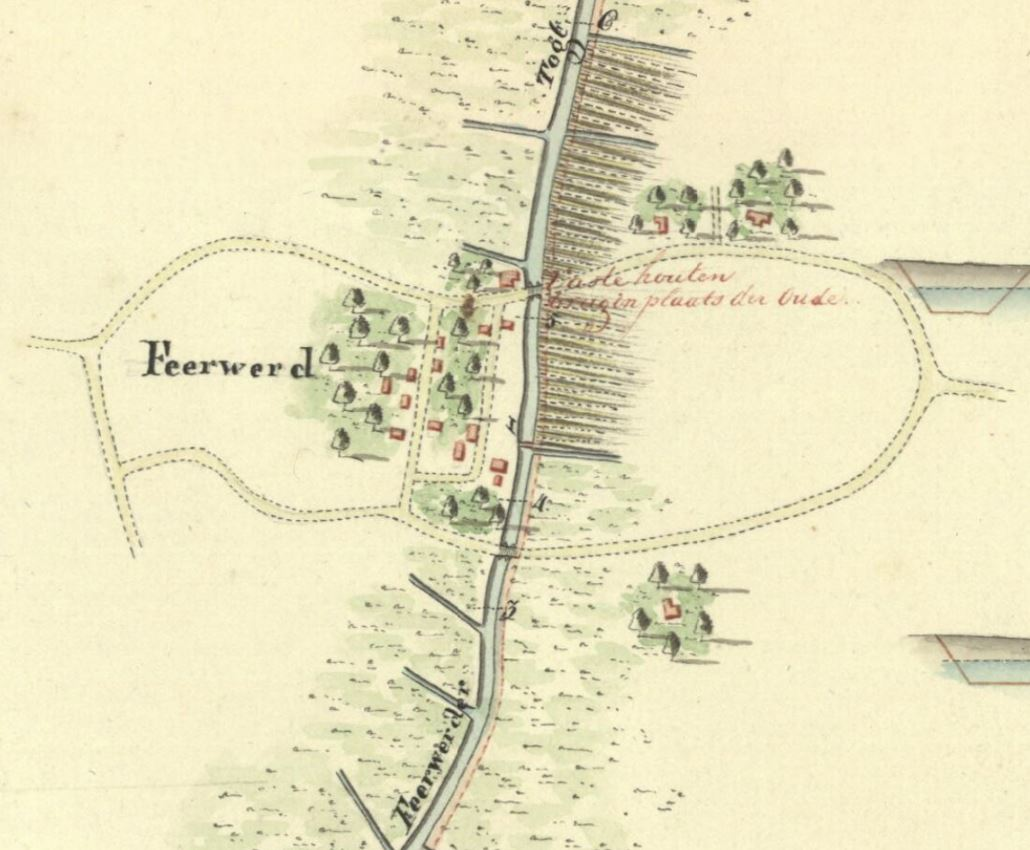
Fragment of a plan map from 1825 for the Oldehoofsch canal to be constructed

Until the early 19th century, the thoroughfares through Feerwerd mainly ran along the higher places in the landscape and avoided the watercourses where possible. These were the Meedenerweg to Aduard, located further south, the Lucaspad and the Allersmaweg to Ezinge and the Zijlsterweg via Aduarderzijl and the Antumerweg to Garnwerd. These clay roads were maintained according to the rules of the Aduarderzijlvest by the owners of the lands on these roads.

Until the digging of the Oldehoofsch canal, the Feerwerdertocht flowed through the village. This drainage ditch was formerly also used for the transport of goods, but in 1757 it is written that the transport had stopped because the residents then transferred their goods via the Het Schoor region to ships across the Reitdiep. There were two bridges over this watercourse in Feerwerd: one on the west side ('westertil') and one on the east side ('oostertil') of the wierde, on the outer edge thereof. This is still visible on the course of the roads on the north and south sides of the current canal. When the Oldehoofsch canal was dug, both bridges were replaced by a new bridge in the center of the village, which replaced a footbridge at this location. This wooden bridge was replaced in 1885 by a stone bridge. Until the Second World War, a transport service (beurtvaart) was carried out over the canal from Ezinge via Feerwerd and Garnwerd to Groningen. For a long time, this was by snik, from 1910 steamboat and later with a diesel boat. Along the south side of the canal, the embankment was reinforced when excavating with soil from the canal, and a widened towpath with rolling posts was built, which soon developed into a rubble road between Saaksum and Feerwerd. In 1859 this road was improved to a gravel road, followed by the other roads between 1870 and 1880, which were financed with money from the Ommelander treasury, which was liquidated in 1875. After a bridge was built over the Reitdiep near Garnwerd in 1933 and a bridge over the Aduarderdiep near Schifpot in 1939, Feerwerd was given a shorter road connection to the east. Next to the bridge in Feerwerd, there is an old kilometer marker that recalls the time when Feerwerd was still at the end of a western road connection to Groningen, which was 2 kilometers longer than the current eastern road connection.

== History ==
=== Etymology ===
The first mention of Feerwerd probably dates from 820, when a certain Diederik donated part of his heritage Feerwerd (Federwrt or Federfurt) to the monastery of Fulda, upon entering this monastery. Diederik is the first count mentioned in the area between the Lauwers and Eems. -werd comes from Old Frisian wrt ("wierde"), but the origin of Feer- is unknown. Just like Fer- with Ferwerd, it is seen as the uninflected form of the man's name Feder, identical to the Old Frisian feder ("father"). An older hypothesis of Kuhn (1968) is that it goes back to the Old Frisian faþr and is therefore related to the river names Pader and Po, which he himself later dropped.

=== Wierde ===
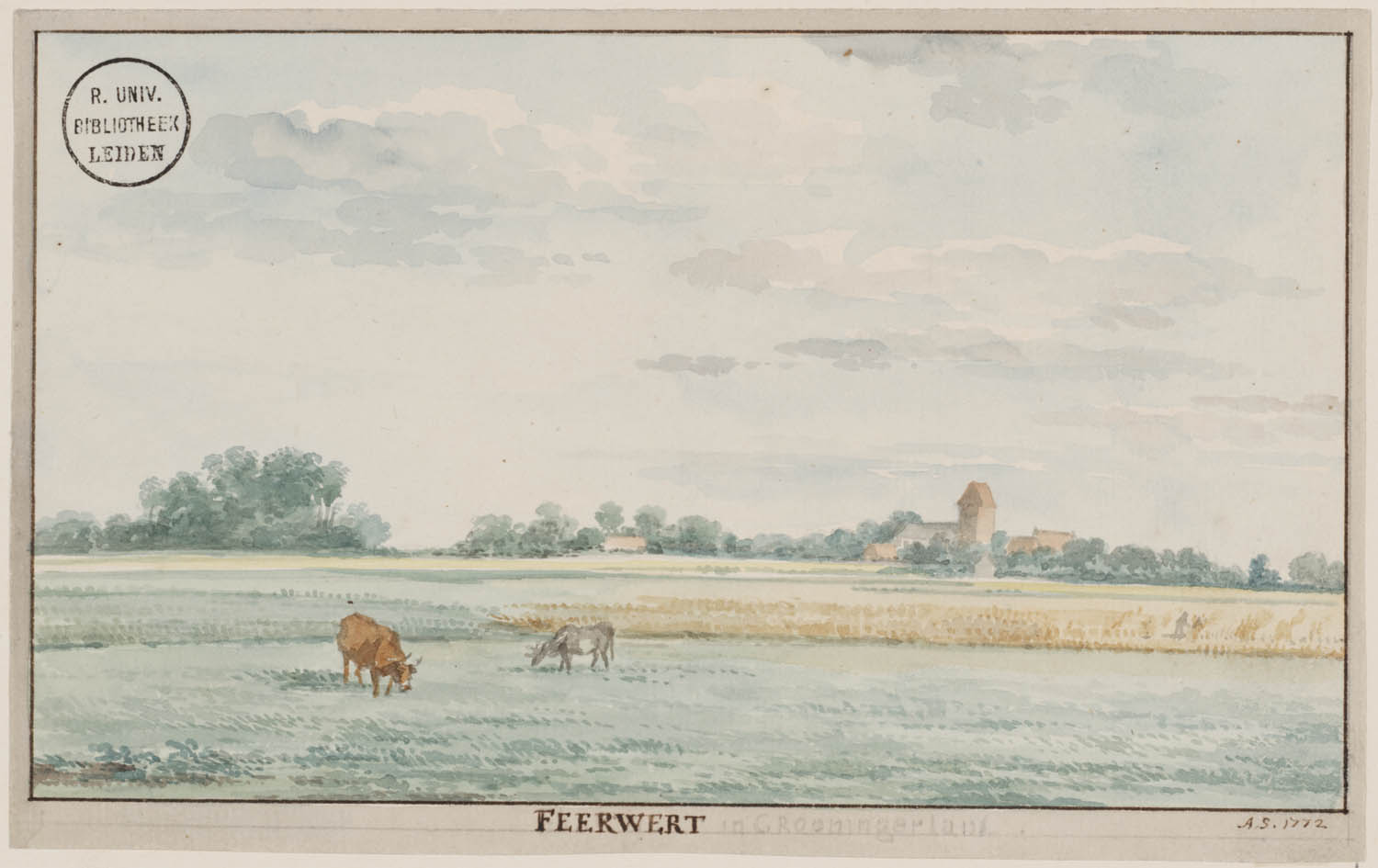
View of Feerwerd (Aart Schouman, 1772)

Feerwerd is built on several wierdes. A double mound is often assumed: a northern mound between Zijlsterweg and Aldringaweg and a southern mound between Aldringaweg and the confluence of Meedenerweg and Onnesweg. The southern wierde is then intersected by the Oldehoofsch canal and its predecessor the Feerwerdertocht. According to another theory, however, this Feerwerdertocht is the separation between the central village wierde between the Aldringaweg and the water and the southern wierde south of the water. There are therefore three wierdes to be distinguished. The central wierde is the highest, at 2.6 meters above NAP. According to Ter Laan, the (double) wierde would have been about 12 hectares in size.

Together with Ezinge and Oostum, the mound complex is one of the oldest mounds in the area. These wierdes are located on a salt marsh wall that runs from Panser to Wierum. The northern wierde has the oldest traces of habitation; between 600 and 400 BC. Remains of human presence have been found on the southern wierde from about 400 BC (Middle Iron Age) and on the central mound from ca. 200 BC. In the 15th century a Feerwerder falch is mentioned. This high clay area (valge) was probably on the eastern bank of the Feerwerdertocht between Feerwerd and Aduarderzijl.

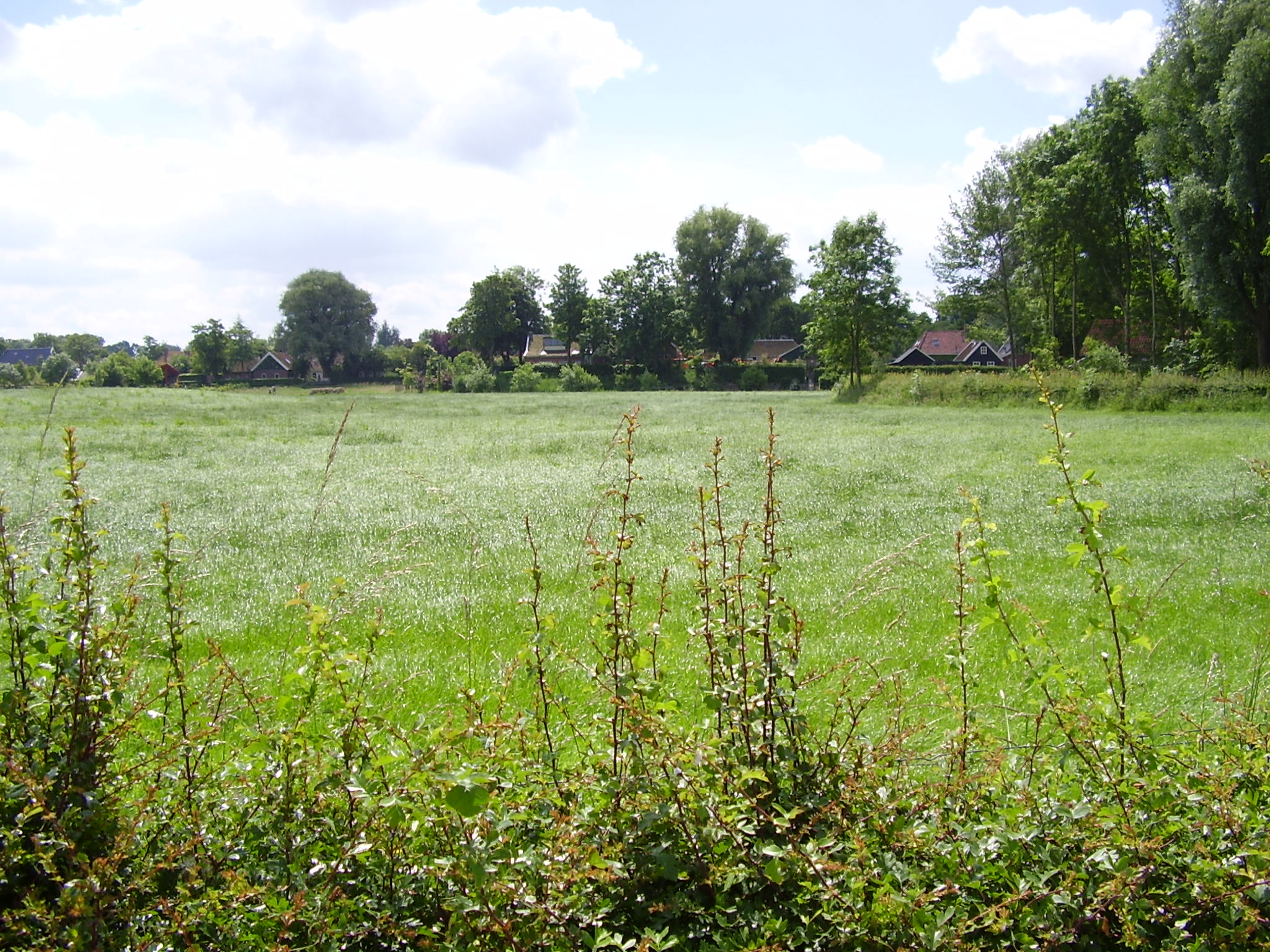
View of the steep edge on the northern side of the double mound

The Middag landscape in which Feerwerd is located was embanked in the 12th century (High Middle Ages). The village then came to lie on a peninsula together with Ezinge and Garnwerd.

Around 1894, the excavation of the northern mound of Feerwerd was started. In 1905, the southern wierde was also 'cut' as it was then called. In any case, these excavations continued until 1917. The uninhabited largest parts of both mounds were almost completely excavated. However, both mounds kept their 'ox passage'; the Oosterweg and the northern part of the Valgeweg near the northern wierde and the Meedenerweg and Onnesweg near the southern wierde. However, the adjacent circular ditch has largely disappeared. In 2002, the steep edge of the northern wierde was partly supplemented. A hawthorn hedge was also planted along the ox passage. However, it did not come to a further proposed wierde addition of both wierdes. In 2018, the 3-hectare southern wierde was purchased by Het Groninger Landschap Foundation, which wants to turn it into a flower-rich grassland.

=== Borgs ===
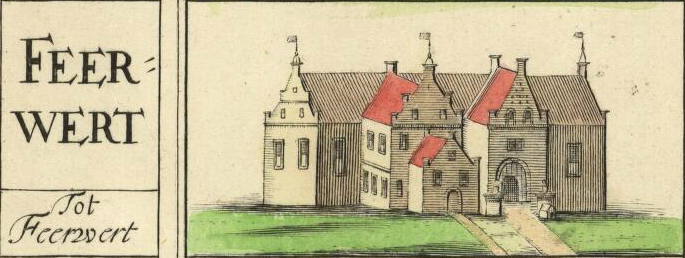
The former Aldringaborg (also Grote borg, Aldringaheerd, or Oude Bosch) on the map of Willem and Frederik Coenders van Helpen (1678). It was demolished in 1735.

In 1449, the Abyngeheert (called Abyngehuus in 1455) is mentioned in a deed of exchange with a steenhuis ('stone house'), the location of which is not mentioned. In this year the property was transferred to the monastery of Selwerd. Because of this, this house has never become a borg (a Groninger type of castle). This was the case for two other noble houses: the Aldringaborg, or Grote borg ('big castle') to the northwest of the village, and the Luursemaheerd or Kleine borg ('small castle') to the south of the village. In the 17th century, the owners of these borgs clashed several times before the Aldringaborg came into the hands of the same family through sale. Both borgs were sold for demolition in the 18th century. Only the foundations of the Aldringaborg can still be seen.

=== Development of the village ===
Feerwerd formed one of the courts in Groningen. The jurisdiction counted 15 ommegangen. The village was also one of the schepperijen (parts of the predecessors of current-day Dutch water boards) of the Aduarderzijlvest. It later became part of the Ezinge schepperij, within which it formed the middle kluft, which drained via the Feerwerdertocht into the Aduarderdiep. The hamlet of Schilligeham also belonged to the schepperij.

The village originally arose on the southern part of the northern wierde, where the village center with the church is located. With the emergence of the municipality of Ezinge in 1811, it came to lie in the middle of this new municipality. From the start, several attempts were made (in vain) to move the town hall from Ezinge to Feerwerd: in 1832, 1866, 1898, 1899, and 1915. The village has changed little since the 19th century. The most important change was the digging of the Oldehoofsch canal in 1827, which created a road connection south of the village, on which a mill and a café were built. With the construction of bridges over the Aduarderdiep and the Reitdiep in the 1930s, this also became the main road.

Feerwerd has also grown little in recent centuries. Van der Aa wrote in 1843: "One finds no street and very little passage of vehicles". In the 19th century and the first half of the 20th century, the core was somewhat compacted and some expansion took place along the Onnesweg south of the canal. In 1922 the village was connected to the electricity grid, in 1924 paving was laid in the village, and the northern part of the village was connected to the sewage system, followed by the southern part in 1927.

With the exodus from agriculture, many residents left to look for work elsewhere, after which the vacant cheap homes were taken into use by city people, particularly in the 1970s. However, not everyone was happy with it: in the 1980s, many of them wanted to go back, although some of them ended up staying.

The village used to be part of the municipality of Ezinge, which was incorporated into the municipality of Winsum in 1990. After the Middag-Humsterland National Landscape was established in 2005, the residents increasingly began to identify with this area. The other half of this landscape was assigned to the municipality of Zuidhorn in 1990. Under pressure from the population, a referendum was held in 2018 in the villages of the former municipality of Ezinge, in which the vast majority chose to join the new municipality of Westerkwartier. In Feerwerd, 71% of the population voted to join.

=== Industry ===
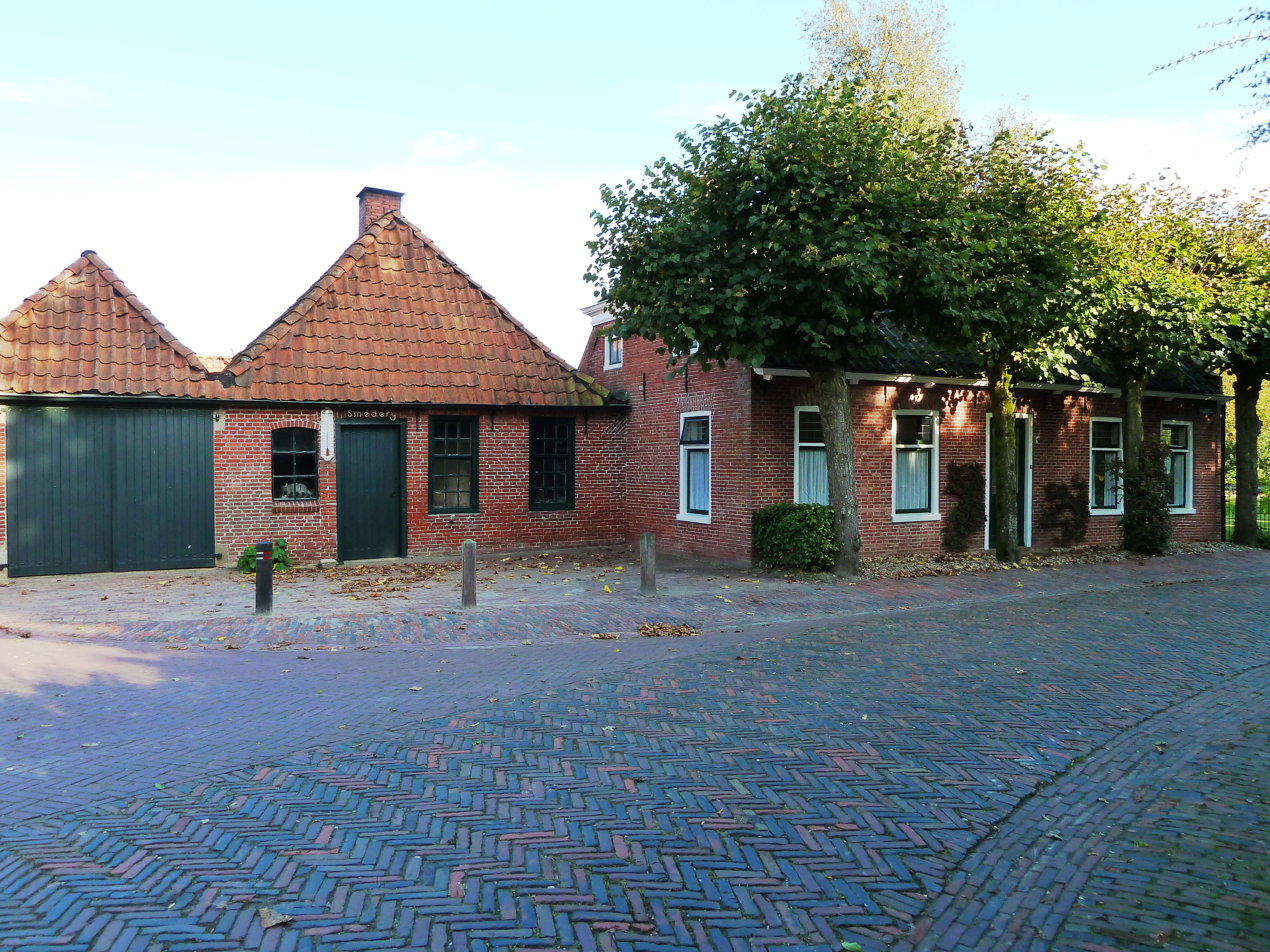
Old forge

According to the schoolmaster's report of 1828, the 'crafts' in Feerwerd at that time consisted of, among other things, 'smithing, baking, carpentry, cooperage, tailoring, and shoemaking'. Besides 'innkeepers' and 'shopkeepers', the village was also visited by itinerant merchants. In the first half of the 20th century, this middle class was still largely present. At that time there were, among other things, three grocers, two cafes, a blacksmith shop, two bakeries, a butcher's shop, wheelwright, shoemaker and clog maker. The village had a loading and unloading area on the Oldehoofsch canal, where, among other things, peat was supplied and from where the fertile mound soil was also removed around 1900.

After the Second World War, the business of the middle classes quickly declined with the outflow from agriculture and the rise of the car. The last forge closed in 1972 and the last bakery in the 1980s. When the last café at Torensmaweg 1 burned down in 1976, the village lost its meeting place. In 1977 a village hall was opened in the old school. For a long time, an important employer for the village was the brickworks of the Kamerlingh Onnes family near Schifpot. This factory was taken over by the Verenigde Steenfabrieken Groningen ('United Brick Factories Groningen', V.S.G) in the early 1920s, which owned many factories in the province of Groningen, Middelstum, Fraamklap, Bedum, Zuidwolde, Scheemda, Winneweer, which existed between 1855 and 1974. The V.S.G also owned Farm Langeveld where the famous coin treasure was found. Nowadays the village has no shops anymore, except for a bicycle shop.

== Sights ==
=== Church and presbytery ===
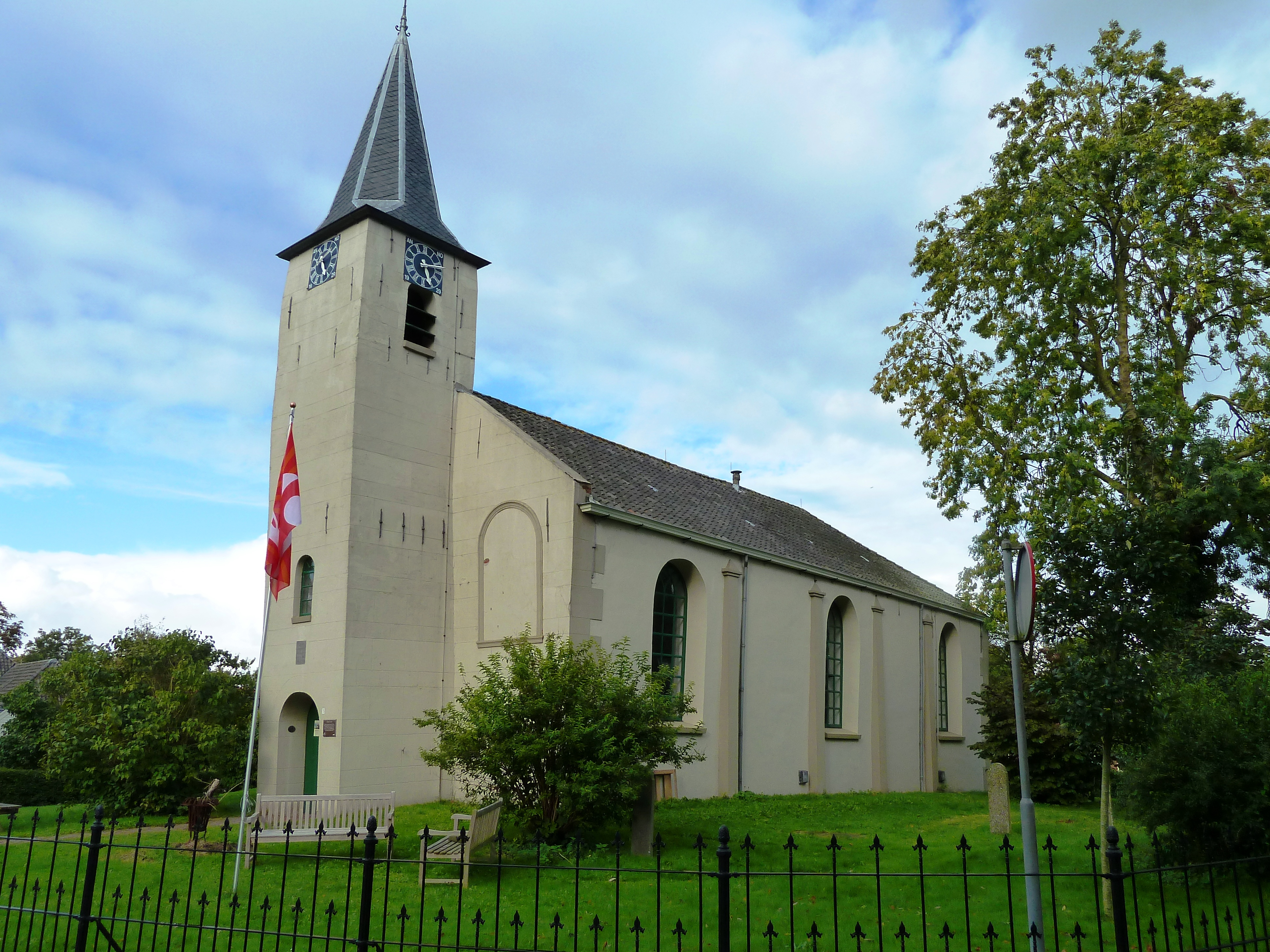
Jacobuskerk

In the middle of the village is the Jacobuskerk ('St. James' Church', Valgeweg 3), which dates from the beginning of the 13th century, but was extensively renovated in the 19th century. The current tower was also added at that time. Below the church is the 16th-century burial vault of the Aldringa family. The church does not have its own organ, but it does have an empty organ front. The church has been designated as a resting place and has been a permanent part of the annual Summer Jazz Bicycle Tour since the beginning. Many music performances are also held every year.

The presbytery (Valgeweg 2) is a villa that was rebuilt in 1883 and was used until 1949. The building stands prominently next to the entrance to the bridge over the canal.

=== School ===
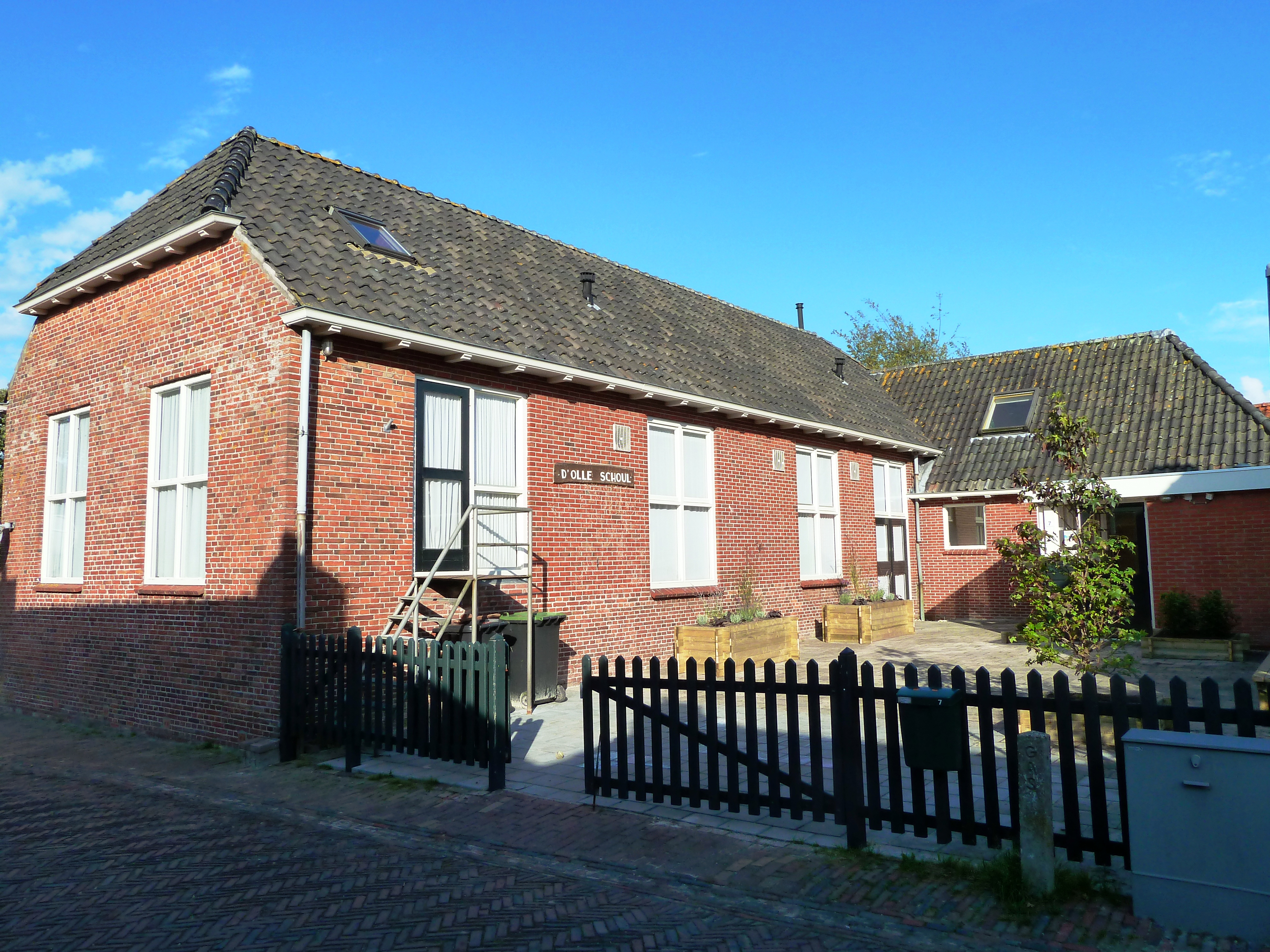
Village hall 'd Olle Schoul (old school)

The children of the village used to be taught in a church hall. In 1861 a school was built (Valgeweg 7) of two classrooms with a master's house next to it (Valgeweg 5). In 1936, larger windows were placed in the south wall of the school and the other windows were walled up. Although the Provincial executive of Groningen advised in 1938 to build a new school in Feerwerd and to close the old schools in Ezinge and Feerwerd, the city council decided in 1940 to close the school in Feerwerd and from then on to teach the children in Ezinge. According to Olthuis, this was because there were too few children in Ezinge, but it also played a role in the fact that employment at Aduarderzijl virtually disappeared due to the decline in agricultural employment at the beginning of the 20th century, which meant that the number of children who went to school from there in Feerwerd also declined sharply. It was, therefore, more logical to move the school to Ezinge. After the school had successively served as a distribution office during the war and from 1955 onwards as a gymnastics building, the building was used as a village hall after a major renovation between 1976 and 1978.

=== Other buildings in the village ===
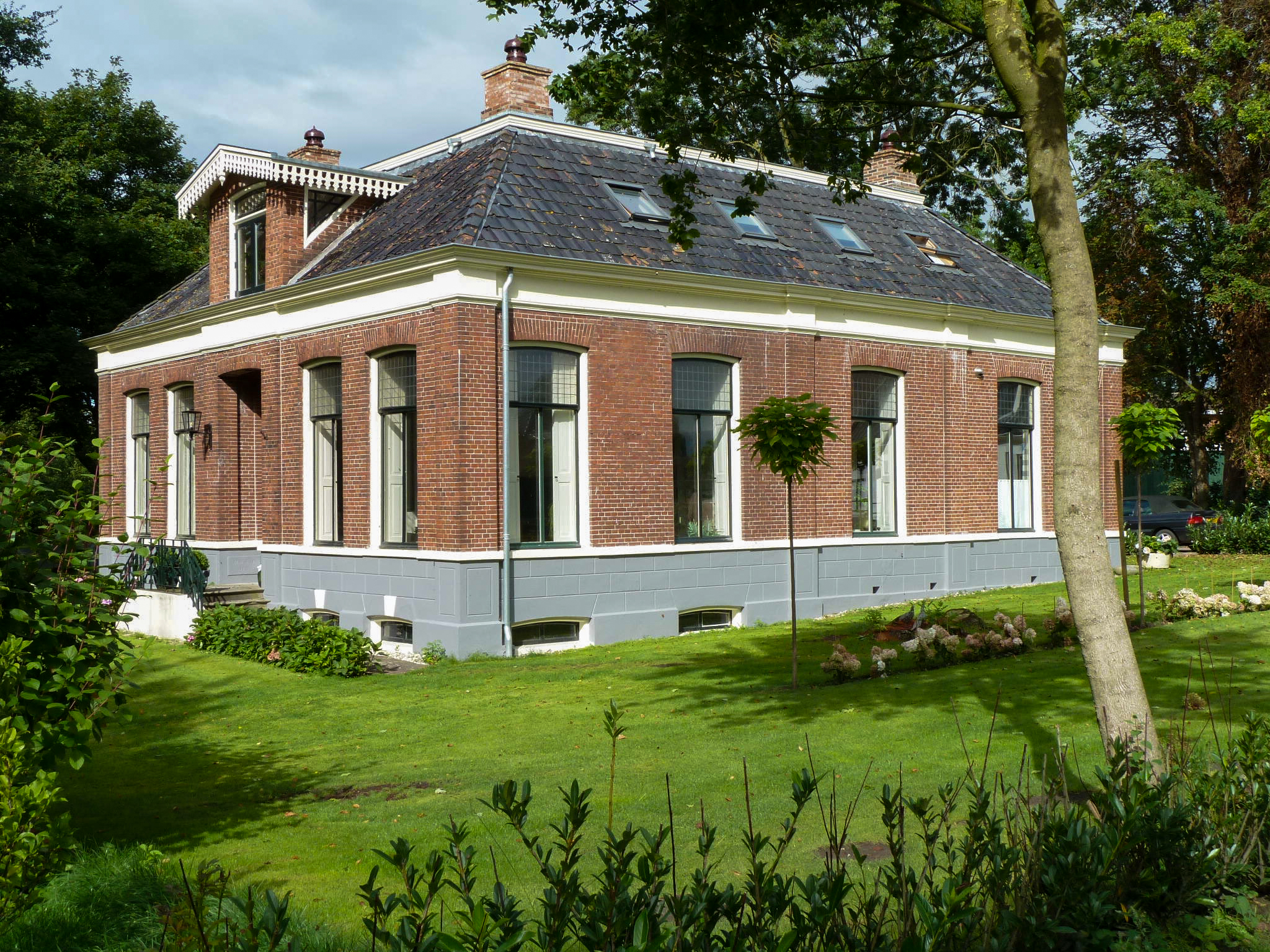
Presbytery

The former poorhouse (Aldringaweg 10) from 1904 used to consist of 4 houses. The entrance to the northern and southern houses was in the side wall, the other two houses could only be reached from the rear. Due to a lack of poor, other families sometimes also lived there. In the 1960s the houses were merged into 2 houses and in the 1980s into 1 house.

On the south side of the village is the wind mill Joeswert (Mentaweg 1A) from 1855. It is one of the few mills in which spelt is ground. The one-story miller's house with a hip roof (Mentaweg 1) dates from the same period. The former sarries hut, which belonged to a predecessor of this mill, was demolished in 1939, according to Ter Laan.

Along the Valgeweg are a number of partly neoclassical rentier houses with hip roofs from the third quarter of the 19th century. Examples of this are Valgeweg 9, 11, 12, and 16. The old grocery house at Aduarderdiepsterweg 1 near Schifpot also belongs to this.

The Onnesbörg villa of the brick factory owner Kamerlingh Onnes used to be along the Onnesweg. During the First World War, this house was used to house Belgian internees, after which the house was demolished around 1920. Subsequently, 2 double workers' houses were built on the site of the house: Onnesweg 6-12 (even). In front of numbers 10 and 12, half of the old pavement of the former villa is located at each of the two houses.

=== Places of interest outside the urban area ===
The Mentaheerd (Mentaweg 2) is located on the north side of the road from Ezinge to Feerwerd and is accessible via its own drawbridge over the Oldehoofsch canal, which follows the course of the former Peizerdiep. The farm is surrounded by a moat and is partly surrounded by tree belts. De Mentaheerd was first mentioned in 1492 and was a noble heerd with grietenij rights and collation rights in Ezinge. Before digging the canal, the farm had a road connection with this village via the Frouwemaheerd to the Allersmaweg. At that time there was only a footpath to Feerwerd. Until the canal was dug, the farm was responsible for maintaining the Feerwerdertocht and the Oostertil in the village. Owner Klaas Olferts Cleveringa was mayor of Ezinge from 1811 to 1813. In 1967, the company buildings were rebuilt after a fire. In 1990 it became a residential farm.

The head-neck-rump farmhouse Groot-Beswerd at Meedenerweg 23 near Beswerd, south of the village, dates from the first half of the 19th century in its present appearance. This farm has a long front house with a gable roof and gable ends. The back wall of the house consists of cloister bricks. This is possibly a remnant or reuse of the farm Olt Luersema, which was already mentioned in the 15th century.

Northwest of the village is the cemetery from 1873, which is surrounded by characteristic old chestnut trees.

Along the Oldehoofsch canal, there are two roller poles, which were removed in 1967, but were replaced in 1974.

== Bibliography ==
- Delvigne, J.J. (1994). Vroeger in Middag: uit de historie van de gemeente Ezinge: Ezinge, Garnwerd, Feerwerd, Oostum, Aduarderzijl en omstreken (in Dutch). Streekhistorische Vereniging Middagherland.
- Duinkerken, W. (1977). De gemeente Ezinge. Historie van vier dorpen (in Dutch).
- Olthuis, F.J. (1991). Feerwerd toen: het leven van alledag in en om Feerwerd in vroeger jaren (in Dutch). Ezinge: Middagherland.
