= Oostum =

- Hamlet
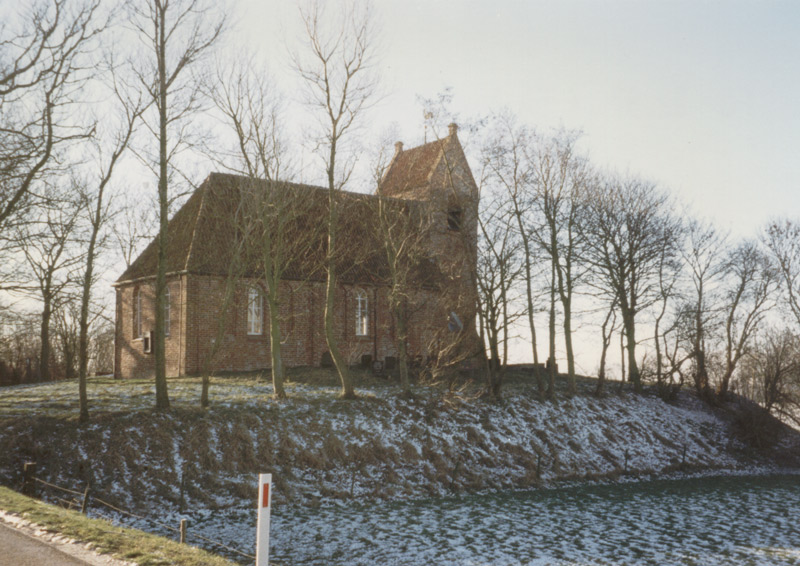
- Church in 1997

- Location of Oostum in Groningen in the Netherlands Oostum (Netherlands)
- Coordinates: 53°16′46″N 6°29′52″E
- Country: Netherlands
- Province: Groningen
- Municipality: Westerkwartier

Population
  - Total: less than 25

Oostum is a wierde on the territory of Garnwerd in the municipality of Westerkwartier in the Dutch province of Groningen. The hamlet lies on the road of the city of Groningen to Garnwerd and is part of the Pieterpad.

== History ==
The mound dates from the Iron Age or later and lies on an old tidal marsh bank. However, the place was possibly inhabited earlier, because signs of a flat settlement were found during drilling that took place to the east of the wierde in 1971. Other excavations found one native Roman and dozens of pieces of medieval pottery.

== Church ==
On the wierde stands the 13th-century church of Oostum, which is perhaps the most illustrated Romanesque church of the province of Groningen. The church was built in the mid 13th century. Originally the church had three bays. But because of the construction of the tower in the 14th century, half a bay came to expire, so there are two and a half bays remaining. Unusual is that the gable-roofed tower, probably placed in the 16th-century tower, is, unlike other towers in the region, transverse. The broad side of the tower is against the church. The bell in the tower dates from 1466. It was made by Henrik Kokenbacker for the church of Feerwerd, located to the north-west of Oostum. Against the west wall are two small buttresses built in 1821.
