= Terp (disambiguation) =

A terp is an artificial dwelling mound created to provide safe ground during storm surges, high tides or flooding.

Terp or TERP may also refer to:

== Places ==
- De Terp metro station, a stop on the Rotterdam Metro
- Saravan, Armenia, formerly called Terp

== Other uses ==
- Maryland Terrapins, known as the Terps, athletic teams
  - Terpsichore, a muse
- Telluride-mediated polymerization, a type of reversible-deactivation radical polymerization
- Terminal instrument procedures (TERPS), aviation instrument approach procedures
- Texas Emissions Reduction Program (TERP), relating to Climate change in Texas § Grants
- Theoretical ex-rights price (TERP), a calculated price for shares after issue of new shares
- TERP system, a technology to facilitate choreographed movement without rehearsal, by Patrice M. Regnier
- TerraForm Power, a subsidiary of SunEdison, stock ticker TERP
- Terp the Terrible, a character in the 1951 book The Hidden Valley of Oz by L. Frank Baum
- Terp Records, an independent music label
- Military slang for language interpreters

== See also ==
- Turp (disambiguation)
- Turps (disambiguation)
- Interpreter
