= Runoff =

Runoff, run-off or RUNOFF may refer to:

- Runoff (hydrology), the flow of water over land
  - Channel runoff, the confined flow of water
  - Surface runoff, the unconfined flow of water over land
  - Runoff model (reservoir), a mathematical model involving rainfall and runoff
  - Runoff curve number, an empirical parameter used in hydrology
- RUNOFF, the first computer text-formatting program
- Runoff or run-off, another name for bleed, printing that lies beyond the edges to which a printed sheet is trimmed
- Runoff or run-off, a stock market term
- Runoff voting system, also known as the two-round system, a voting system where a second round of voting is used to elect one of the two candidates receiving the most votes in the first round
  - Instant-runoff voting, an extension or variation of runoff voting where a second round can be rendered unnecessary by voters ranking candidates in order of preference
- Run-off area, a racetrack safety feature
- Runoff (2014 film) directed by Kimberly Levin

== See also ==
- Runoff voting (disambiguation)
- All pages with titles containing "runoff", "run-off" or "run off"
