= Aduarderzijl =

Aduarderzijl Auwerderziel (Gronings)
- Hamlet
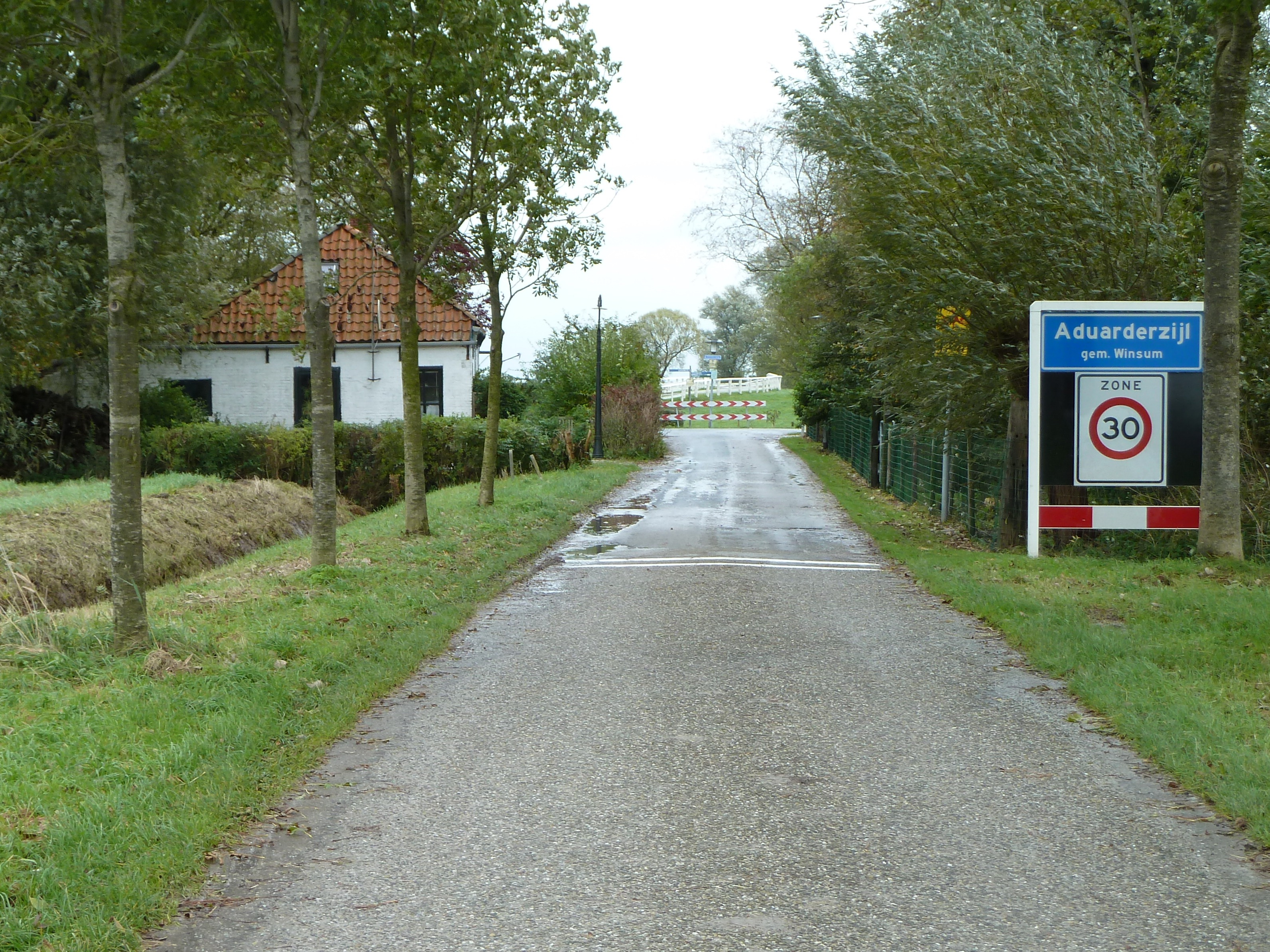
- Entrance to Aduarderzijl

- Location in the province of Groningen in the Netherlands Aduarderzijl (Netherlands)
- Coordinates: 53.31877°N 6.46705°E
- Country: Netherlands
- Province: Groningen
- Municipality: Westerkwartier
- Village: Feerwerd
- Elevation: 1.0 m (3.3 ft)

Population
  - Total: c. 50
- Time zone: UTC+1 (CET)
  - Summer (DST): UTC+2 (CEST)
- Postcode: 9892
- Area code: 0594

Aduarderzijl (Dutch: [ˌaːdyɑrdərˈzɛil]; Gronings: Auwerderziel) is a hamlet in the municipality of Westerkwartier in the province of Groningen in the Netherlands, located to the south of the Reitdiep. Administratively, it is part of the village of Feerwerd.

The hamlet is located east of the hamlet of Allersma, northeast of the village of Ezinge, north of the village of Feerwerd, and northwest of the wierde of Antum and the village of Garnwerd. The hamlet is home to the lock complex of the same name, the Aduarderzijlen. This complex near the Reitdiep consists of restored locks from 1706 and 1867.

== Gallery ==
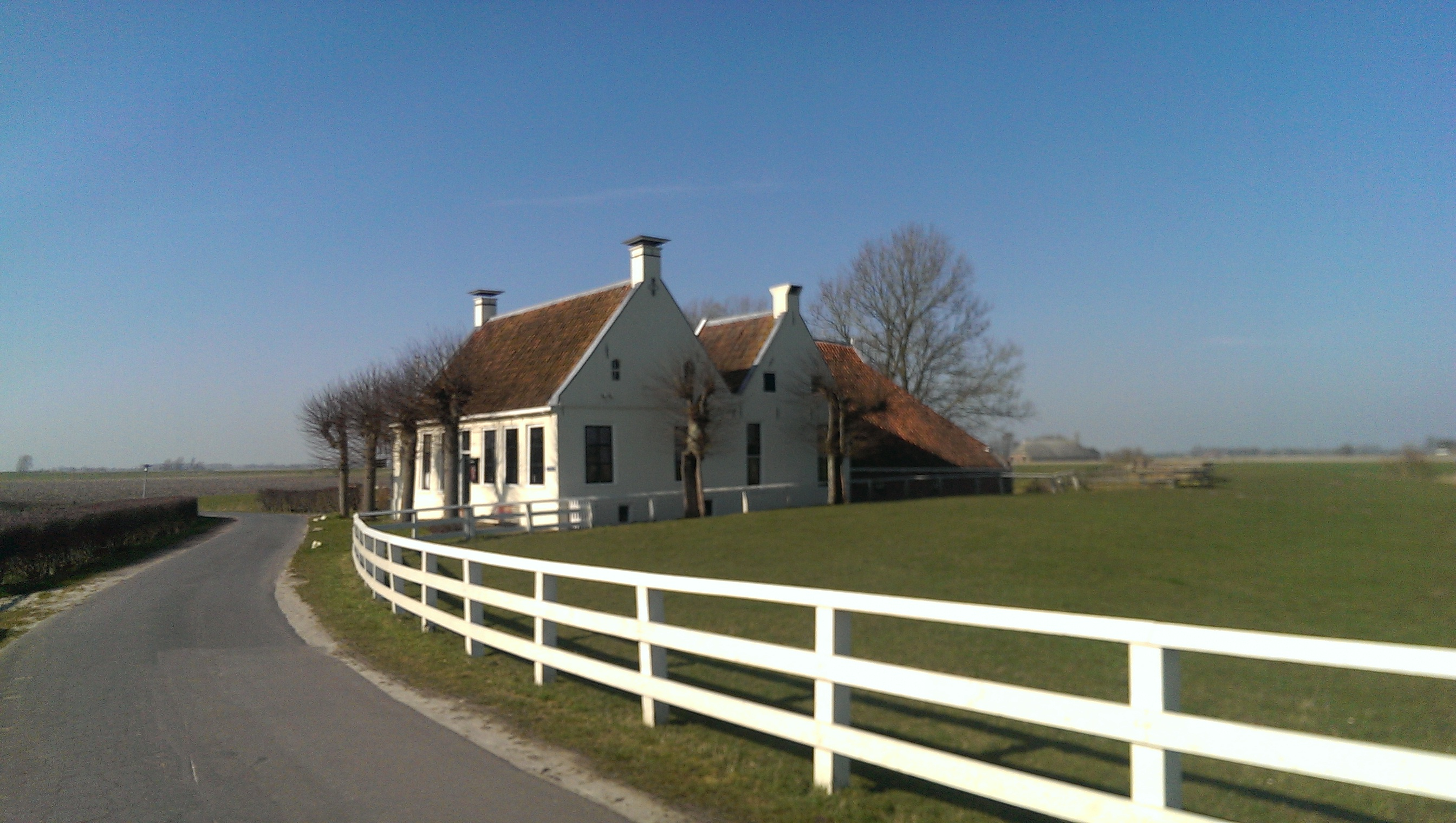
't Waarhuis

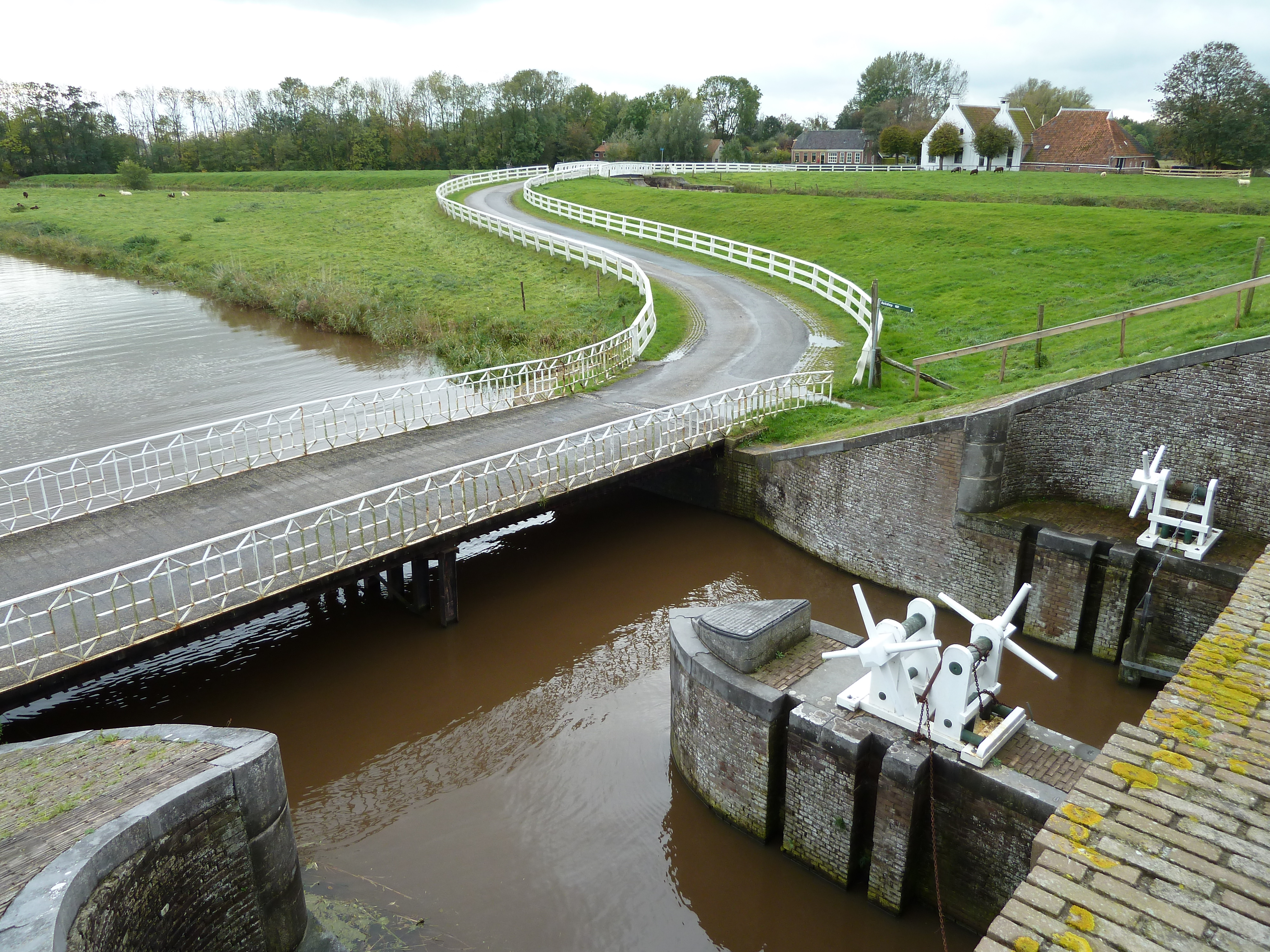
Aduarderzijl seen from the Kokersluis with 't Waarhuis behind it on the right

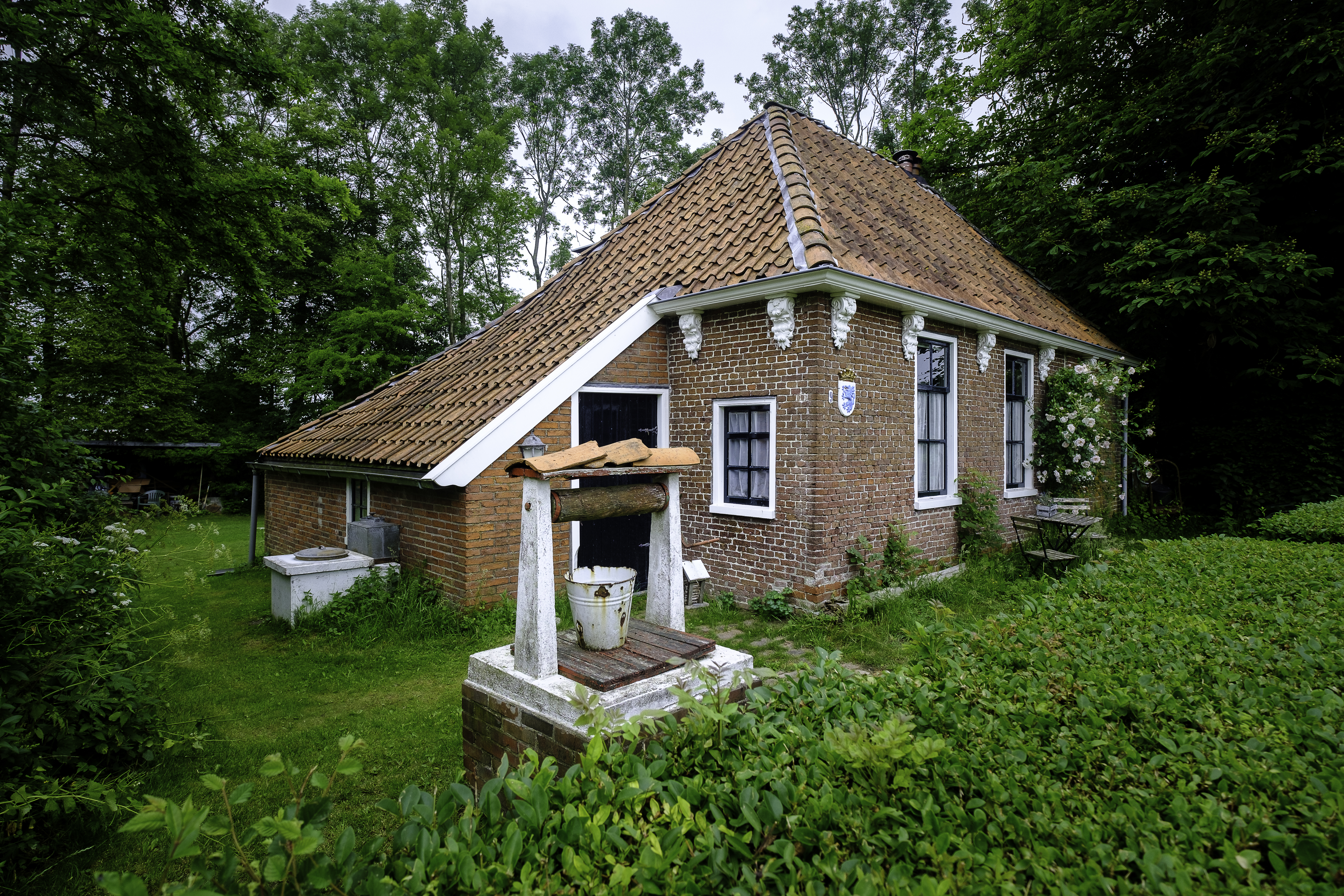
Former worker's house

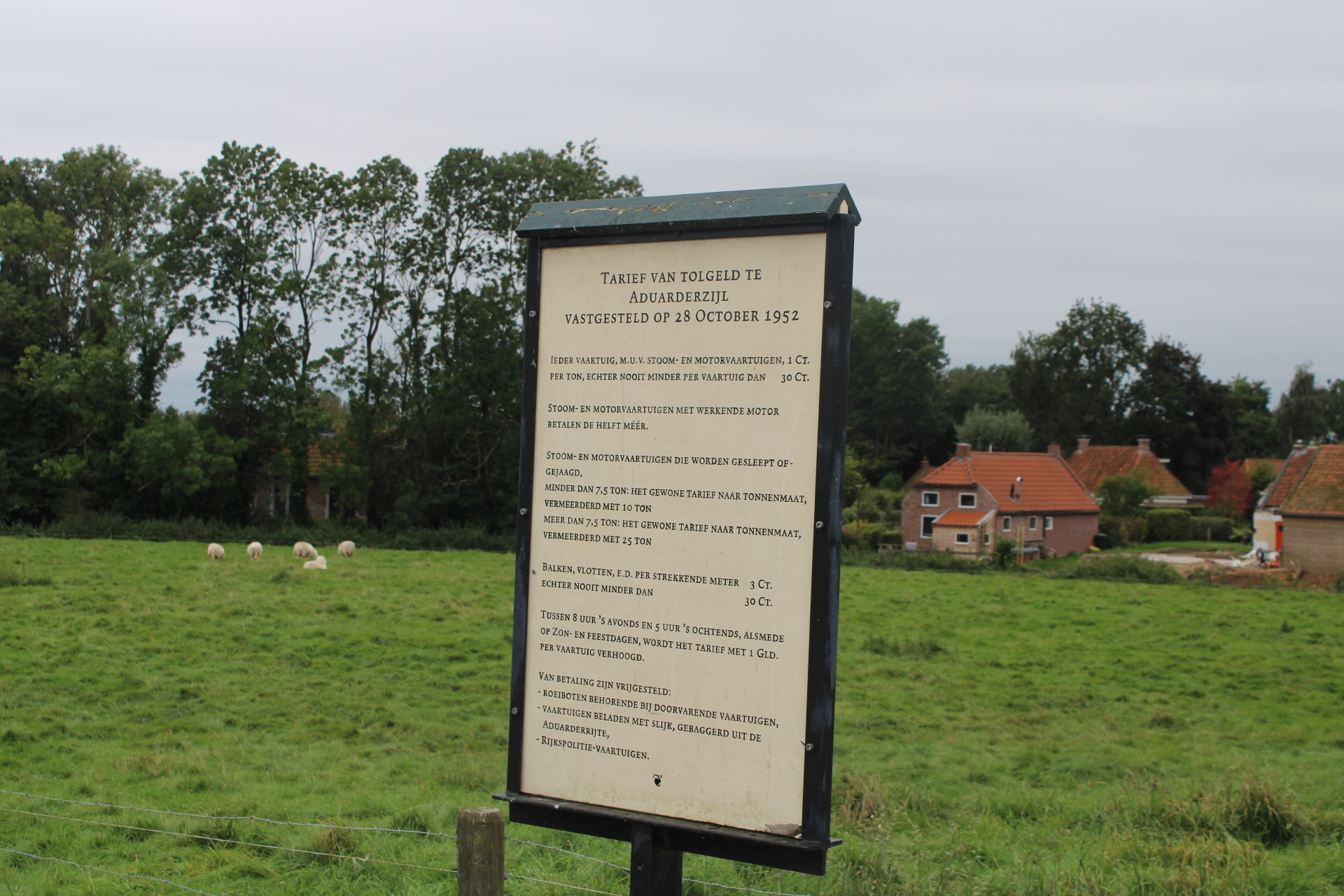
Rate list
