= Turp =

Turp may refer to:

- Turp, Iran, a village in Rudqat Rural District, Sufian District, Shabestar County, East Azerbaijan Province
- André Turp (1925–1991), Canadian tenor
- Daniel Turp (born 1955), professor of constitutional and international law at the Université de Montréal
- TURP, Transurethral resection of the prostate

== See also ==
- Turps (disambiguation)
- Terp (disambiguation)
