= Turps =

Turps may refer:

- Turpentine, colloquially turps, distilled tree resin, used as a solvent
  - White spirit, turpentine substitute
- Ian Turpie (1943–2012), or "Turps", Australian celebrity
- Turps Banana magazine, founded in 2005 by Marcus Harvey

== See also ==
- Terp (disambiguation)
- Turp (disambiguation)
