= Yellow strip =

Yellow strip price or touch price is a term used in the UK stock market (LSE) by Market makers for the highest bid price or lowest offer price, shown on the SEAQ or SETS screen in a yellow strip.

The difference between the lowest (offer) and highest (bidding) price is known as the bid–offer spread.
