= Two-tier tender offer =

A two-tier tender offer is an offer to purchase a sufficient number of stockholders' shares so as to gain effective control of a firm at a certain price per share, followed by a lower offer at a later date for the remaining shares. For example, an investor may offer $50 per share for up to 51% of a firm's outstanding stock and then, having gained control, offer $40 for each of the remaining shares.

Two-tier tender offers have been regarded as controversial practices. In the United States, they have at times attracted the attention of members of the Securities and Exchange Commission.
