= Runoff voting =

Runoff voting can refer to:

- Election methods where candidates are eliminated based on a comparison of vote tallies:
  - Two-round system, a voting system where only the top two candidates from the first round continue to the second round.
  - Instant-runoff voting, an electoral system where votes rank candidates and if necessary last-place candidates are eliminated one by one until one candidate has a majority of votes.
  - Contingent vote, a preferential ballot version of the two-round system.
  - Exhaustive ballot, an iterated voting system where, if necessary, numerous rounds of voting are held sequentially. Last-place candidates are eliminated one by one until a round of voting sees a candidate receive a majority of votes.
