= Winneweer =

- Village
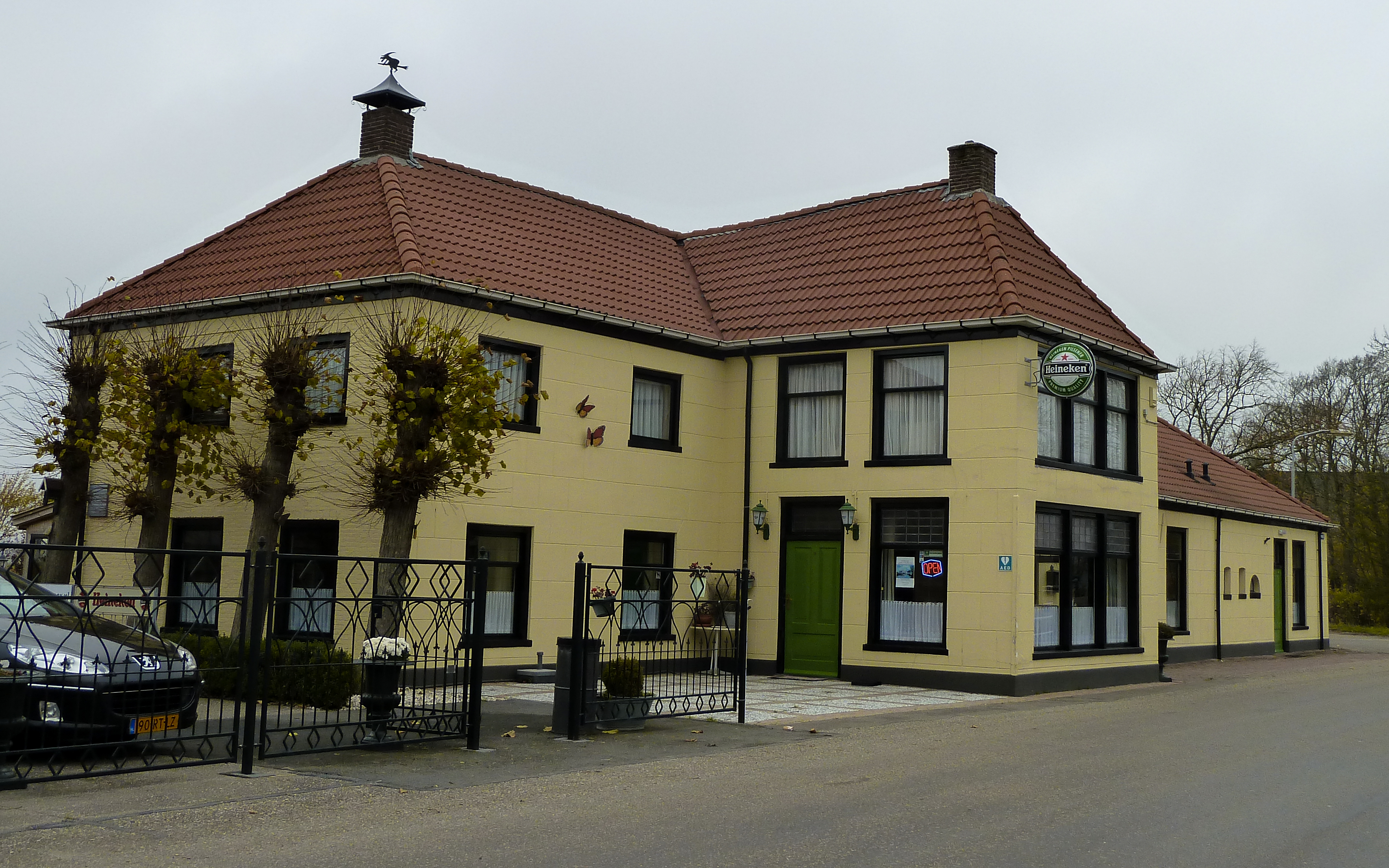
- The pub after which the village was named in 2013

- Location of Winneweer in the province of Groningen Winneweer (Netherlands)
- Coordinates: 53°18′35″N 6°44′50″E
- Country: Netherlands
- Province: Groningen
- Municipality: Eemsdelta; Groningen

Area
  - Total: 0.77 km^{2} (0.30 sq mi)
- Elevation: 0.3 m (0.98 ft)

Population (2021)
  - Total: 95
  - Density: 120/km^{2} (320/sq mi)
- Time zone: UTC+1 (CET)
  - Summer (DST): UTC+2 (CEST)
- Postal code: 9793
- Dialing code: 050

Winneweer (pronounced [ˈʋɪnəʋeːr]) is a small village in the municipalities of Eemsdelta and Groningen in the Dutch province of Groningen.

The village was first mentioned in 1668 as "Winne-weer, een Logijs-plaets", and refers to an inn which was located near Garrelsweer, and is nowadays a pub. The etymology is unclear.

Before 1850, there was hardly any habitation in Winneweer. After 1850, industry started to settle in Winneweer. A saw mill turned into a wood factory, a dairy factory and a brickworks followed. Winneweer consists of about 50 houses.

== Gallery ==
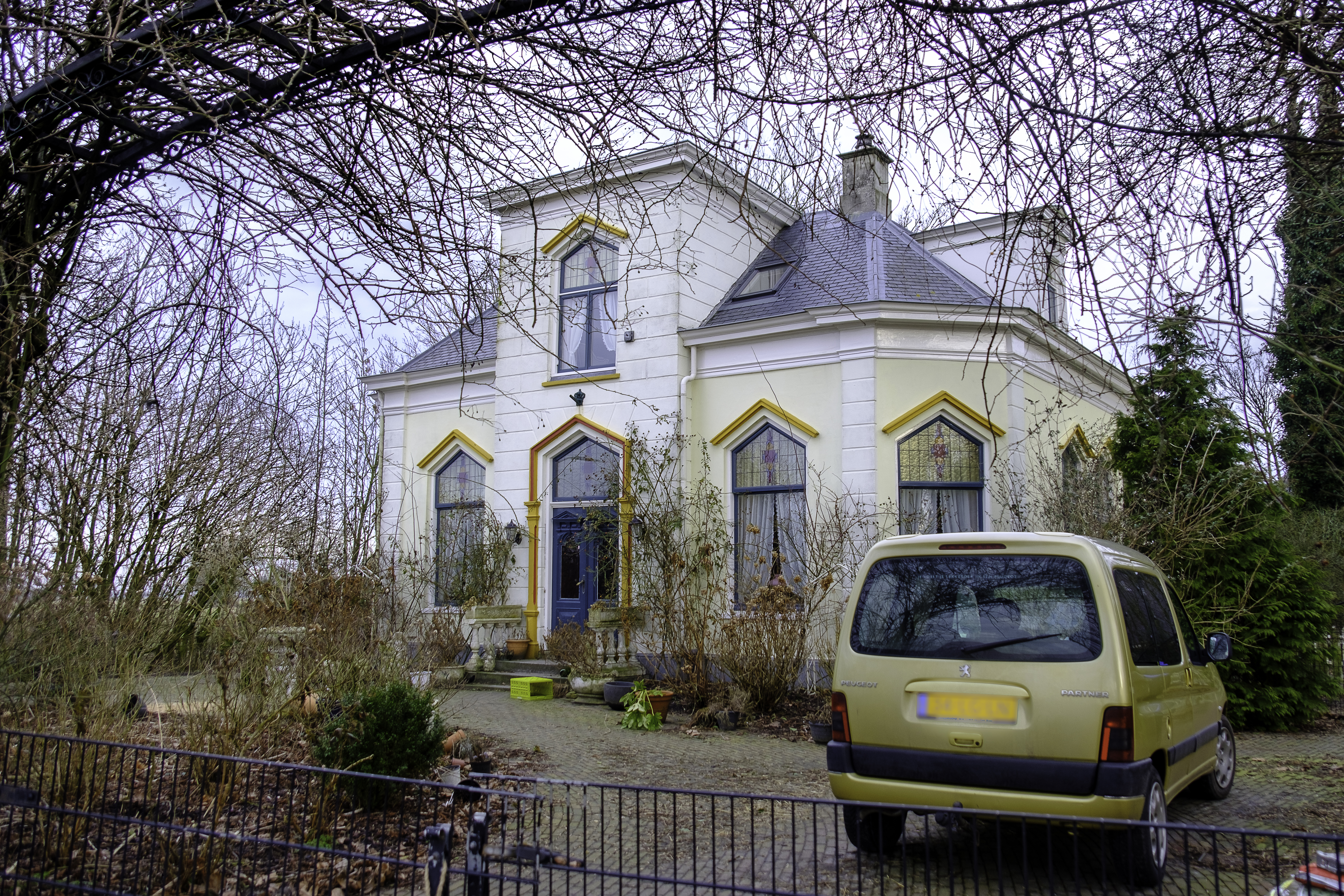
Villa in Winneweer

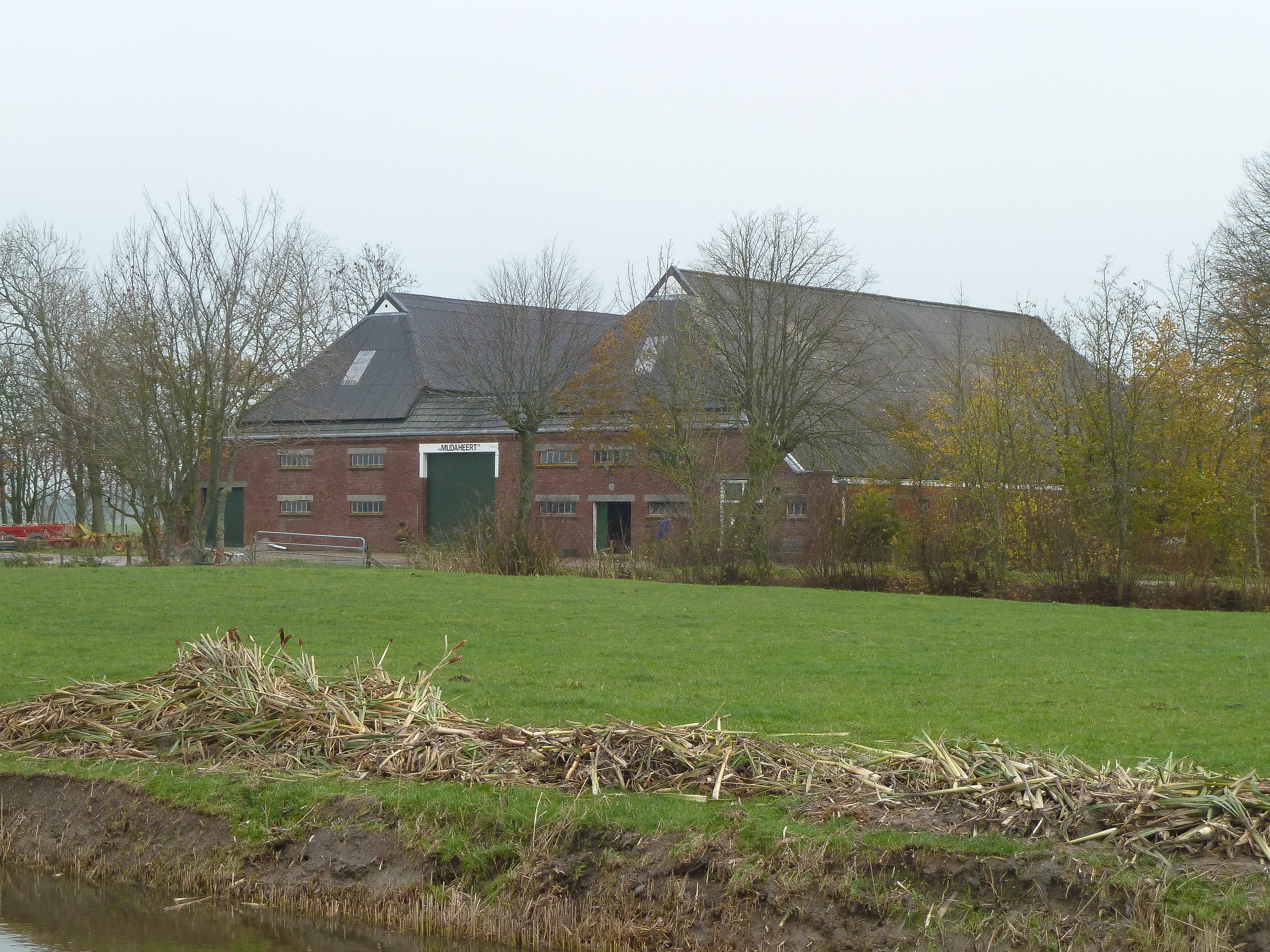
Farm in Winneweer

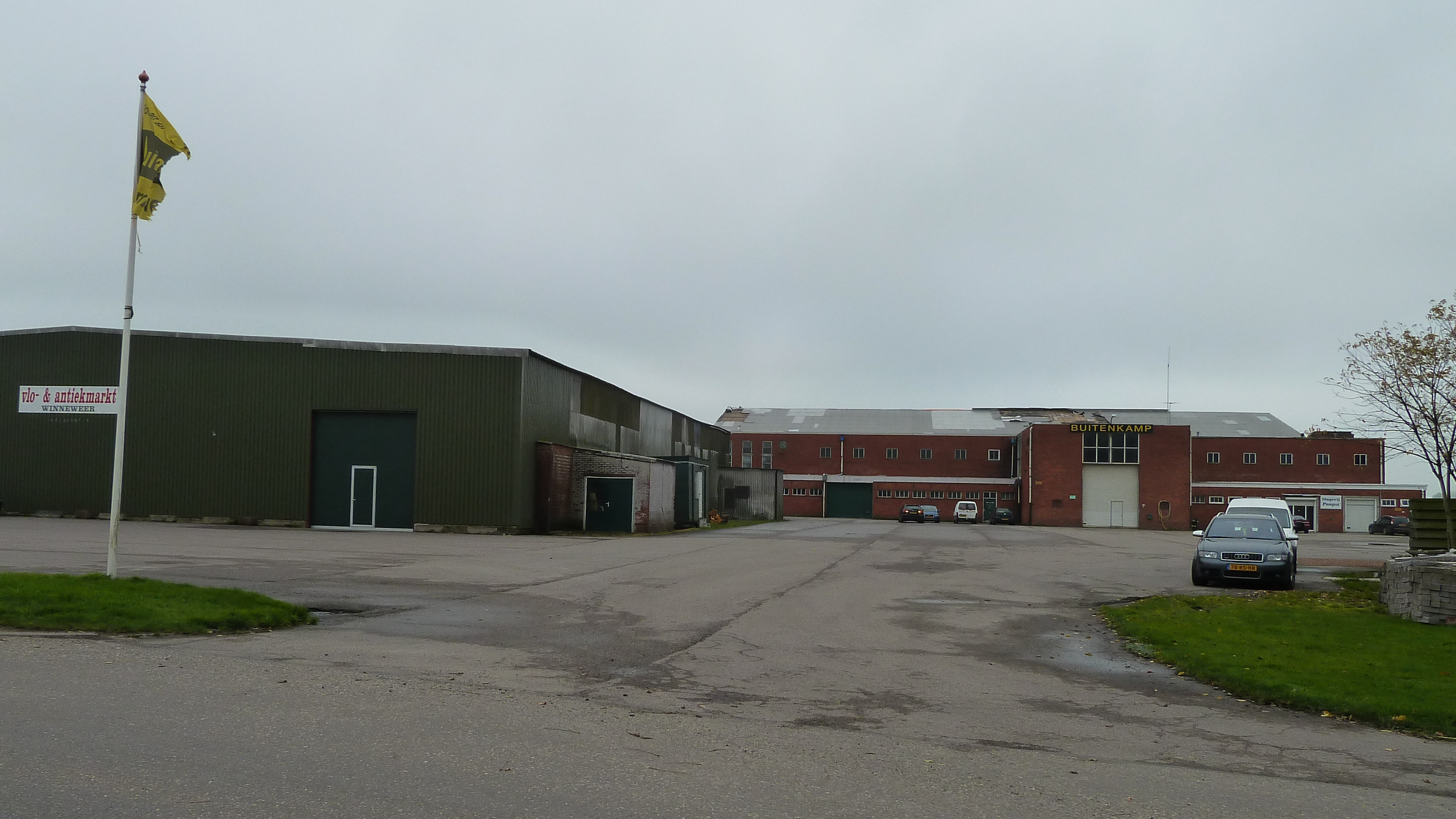
Former brickworks
