= Green sheet (investment term) =

Document describing the terms of an initial public offering

A green sheet accompanies a prospectus or preliminary prospectus for most initial public offerings. They describe the basic terms of the offering that are of the most important to a registered representative such as: sales concession, investment merits, and risks.

A greensheet is an internal document used by underwriting firms to summarize the key components of a new issue, such as its pricing, investment merits, and potential risks. It is distributed to brokers and sales desks to assist in marketing the new issue to investors. The greensheet must remain internal to the firm, adhering to legal requirements that restrict its distribution and content to align with the offering's prospectus.

A registered representative and their clients rarely read a prospectus. The registered representative can use material in the Green Sheet to decide if they want to offer the issue to their clients, and they may elect to read the prospectus if they feel more diligence is warranted. It is a violation of securities regulations for a registered representative to distribute a green sheet outside their dealer firm.
