= Widow-and-orphan stock =

In stock markets, a widow-and-orphan stock is one that reliably provides a regular dividend while also yielding a slow but steady rise in market value over the long term.

== Investors ==
This type of stock has traditionally been an attractive investment for retirees—in some cases actually widows—as well as for professional investors managing trust funds for orphans.

The term serves to denote mostly passive small investors in contrast to wealthy individuals and professional investors who tend to play a more active role and seek greater returns.
