= Ezinge =

- Village
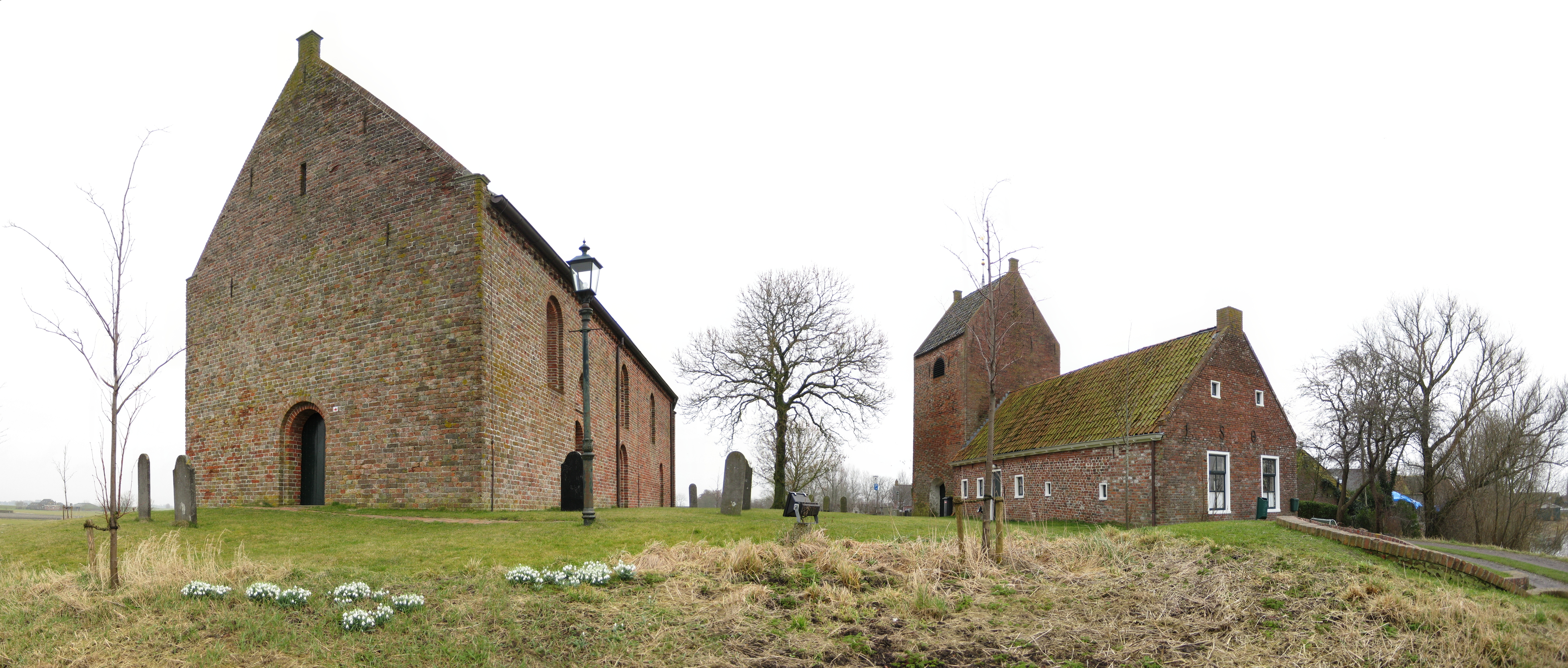
- Church and its tower in 2009

- Coat of arms

- Location of Ezinge in the province of Groningen Ezinge (Netherlands)
- Coordinates: 53°18′33″N 6°26′35″E
- Country: Netherlands
- Province: Groningen
- Municipality: Westerkwartier

Area
  - Total: 0.59 km^{2} (0.23 sq mi)
- Elevation: 0.7 m (2.3 ft)

Population (2021)
  - Total: 675
  - Density: 1,100/km^{2} (3,000/sq mi)
- Time zone: UTC+1 (CET)
  - Summer (DST): UTC+2 (CEST)
- Postal code: 9891
- Dialing code: 0594

Ezinge (Gronings: Aisen or Aizing [ˈɑizn̩, -zɪŋ]) is a village in the Dutch province of Groningen. It is located in the municipality of Westerkwartier, about 15 km northwest of the city of Groningen. Ezinge is the oldest, constantly inhabited village in The Netherlands and is in archeological context referred to as "the Pompeii of the North".

Ezinge was a separate municipality until 1990, when it was merged with Winsum.

== Heritage ==
The village is a legally protected heritage district within the Middag- Humsterland region which itself enjoys the status of Dutch National Landscape and can be found on the tentative list of UNESCO World Heritage. The main sight of the village is the early 13th century church which stands separated from its tower. The tower is connected to an old school building. The three buildings are located on an artificial dwelling hill, known as a terp, with the village and pastures around it, covering a quarter and three quarters, respectively, of the slopes. According to the Dutch Museum of National History, Tacitus has been to Ezinge. Whether true or not, both Tacitus and Pliny the Elder wrote elaborately about the terps and the Frisii and Chauci, the people dwelling upon them.

== History ==
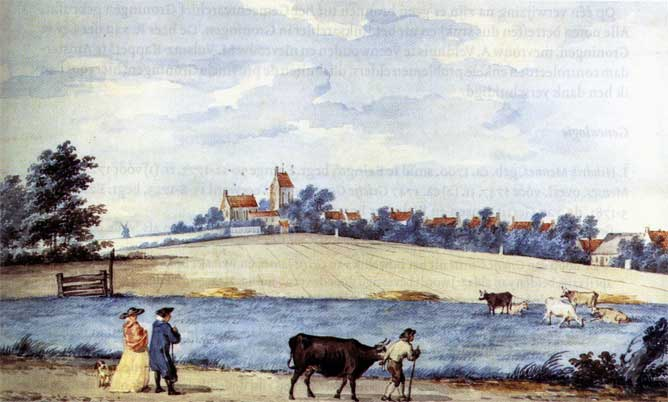
Esinge in 't Westerkwartier van Groeningen, aquarelle from 1772 by Aert Schouman (1710-1792)

Before dikes were built, starting around the beginning of the second millennium, people in the Low Countries, especially in the north, built artificial hills to shelter themselves and their stock from the high tide. Repeatedly over the centuries these hills were reinforced and heightened, often with soil and waste. Cross sections of terps reveal many layers indicating periods of drought, wealth or poverty and even wars and conflagration. At that time before the dikes and later the reclaiming of land, Ezinge was situated on the northern edge of the middle one of the three historical islands of Frisia, now Groningen.

Around the end of the 1920s peat diggers found curious old objects that attracted the attention of archeologist Albert van Giffen. The following decade Ezinge was the centre of attention for archeologists and historians. Van Giffen found evidence for one of the oldest Dutch instances of constant habitation. Among the objects found were 85 farm buildings and 60 outbuildings, most of them with an almost pristine ground plan visible, graves, pottery, bone ice skates, jewelry and tools. Van Giffen learned that the closer he excavated towards the church, the older the objects proved to be. Eager as he was to find even older evidence, he had the church propped and tried to dig under it but soon had to abandon his attempt due to instability of the church. All in all Van Giffen's endeavors revealed that Ezinge was constantly inhabited since 600 BCE and probably earlier, making it one of the oldest towns in Europe. Roman (import-) pottery and artefacts, like a statue of Jupiter, were found, indicating (economic-) relations with cultures far away and a magic wand, indicating pagan beliefs. A golden pommel, closely resembling the one found in Sutton Hoo indicates a close cultural connection to the Anglo-Saxons in Great Britain in the 6th and 7th century CE.

== Church of Ezinge ==
The church was built in the 13th century. It is single-nave, five-sided, closed church with a free-standing tower. A building which was constructed in 1859 and is attached to the tower, is actually not the part of the church.

== Location ==
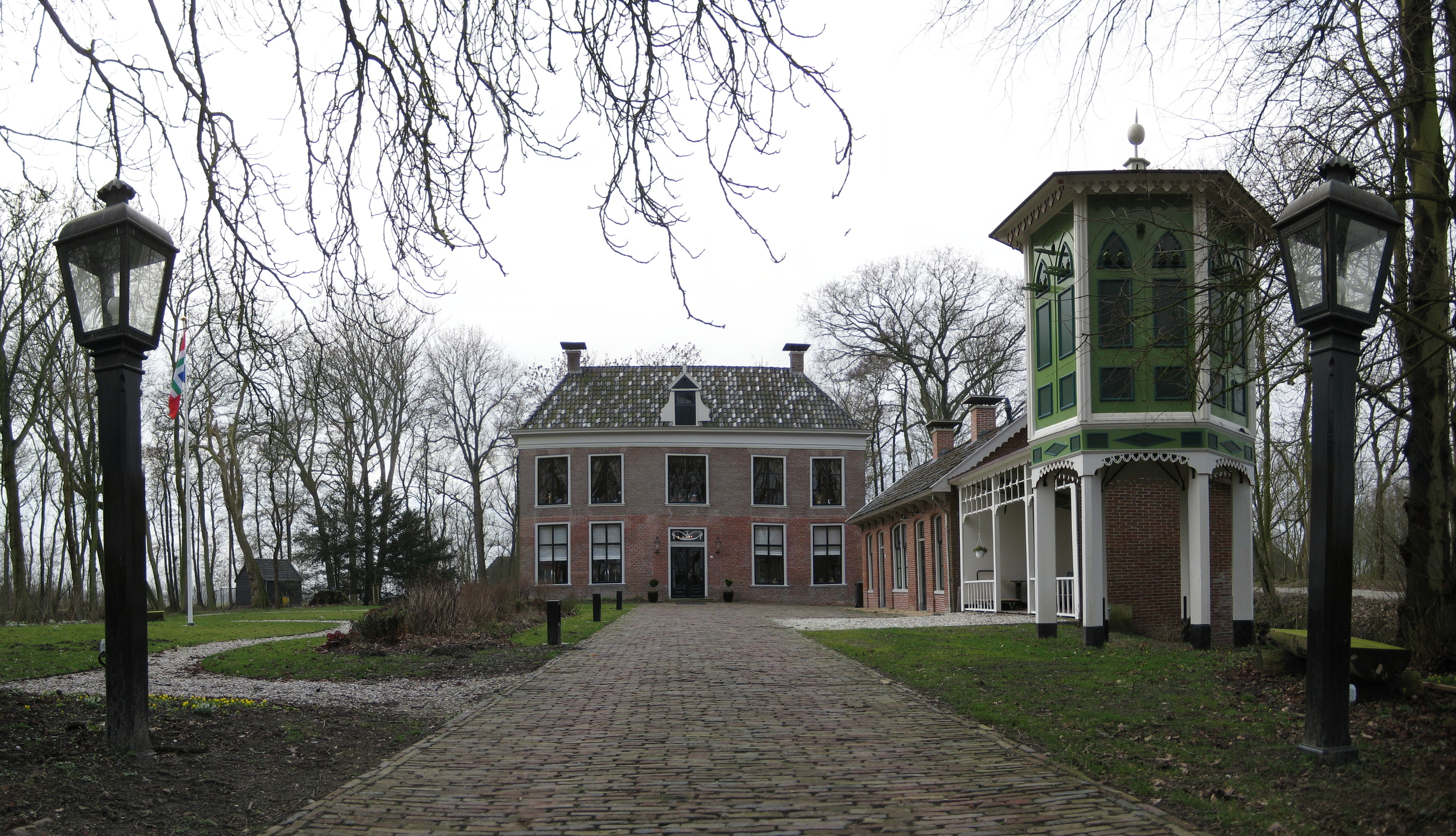
The Allersmaborg

Church of Ezinge on the terp with left excavated terp as pastures and right the natural ice rink, Winter, 2012

Ezinge is located about 15 km from the city of Groningen and about 9 km from the former municipal capital of Winsum. The Allersmaborg (literally Borg (castle) of Allersma) was built in the 15th century on the banks of the Reitdiep river's meanders for economic and defensive purposes. Together with the nearby Aduarderzijl sluices, it acted as a strategic stronghold during battles in the Frisian civil war, the Eighty Years' War and the Siege of Groningen respectively. The borg was later extended into a manor house.

The village is connected to the provincial highway by a bridge. The Village has a supermarket, a bakery, a pharmacy, a post office, a barbershop, a liquor store and 2 pubs. The "Wierdenland" archeological museum in Ezinge offers an insight in the area's history. Further recreation can be found at the natural ice rink in the excavated terp and the annual Ezinge festival with funfair.
