= Theoretical ex-rights price =

Theoretical ex-rights price (TERP) is a situation where the stock and the right attached to the stock is separated. TERP is a calculated price for a company's stock shares after issuing new rights-shares, assuming that all these newly issued shares are taken up by the existing shareholders. The consequence would be that the price will be lower than the old shares but higher than the new issued shares.

== Example ==
If the subscription price of the 1 new share is 800 pence (p) but the market price of 4 existing shares are 1,000p each, then the total value of the 5 shares would be 4,800. So, the market price of the shares after the rights issue is complete would be 960p. The value of the right to buy the one extra share at the subscription price of 800p would be 160p (=(1000-800)*4/(4+1)).
