= Garnwerd =

- Village
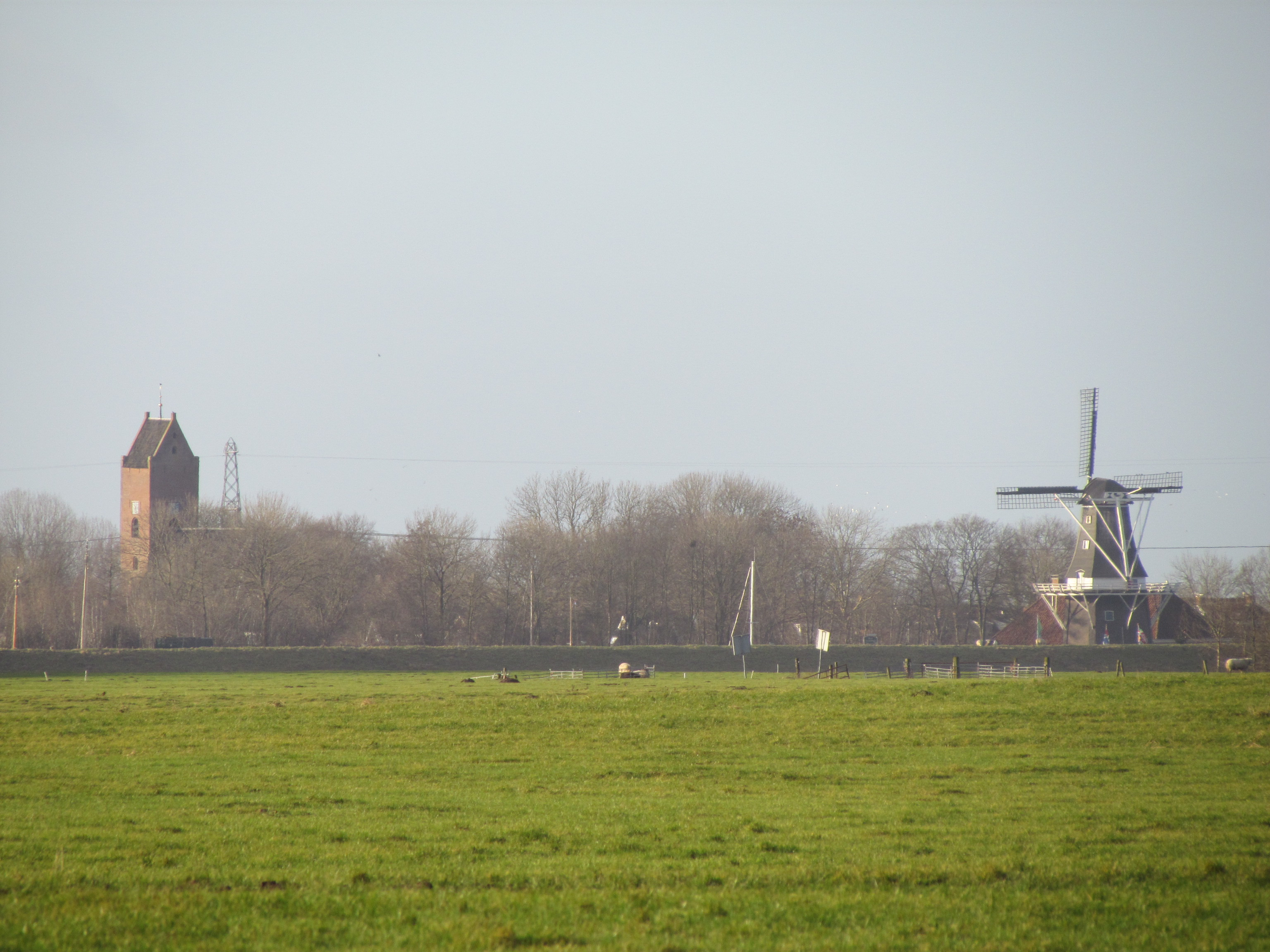
- The church and windmill of Garnwerd

- Location of Garnwerd in Groningen in the Netherlands Garnwerd (Netherlands)
- Coordinates: 53°18′16″N 6°29′34″E
- Country: Netherlands
- Province: Groningen
- Municipality: Westerkwartier

Area
  - Total: 0.20 km^{2} (0.077 sq mi)
- Elevation: 0.9 m (3.0 ft)

Population (2021)
  - Total: 340
  - Density: 1,700/km^{2} (4,400/sq mi)
- Time zone: UTC+1 (CET)
  - Summer (DST): UTC+2 (CEST)
- Postal code: 9893
- Dialing code: 0594

Garnwerd is a wierde village next to the Reitdiep in the municipality of Westerkwartier in the Dutch province of Groningen.

== History ==
The village was first mentioned in the 10th or 11th century as "ad Granauurð". The etymology is unclear. Garnwerd is an elongated terp (artificial living hill) village which developed in the Middle Ages. In 1629, the Reitdiep was canalised and moved to the village. The village flourished due to the trade from Groningen to the former Lauwerszee.

The choir of the Dutch Reformed church dates from 1229. In 1738, the tower collapsed and was rebuilt in 1751. The grist mill De Meeuw dates from 1851, and is occasionally used to grind grain.

Garnwerd was home to 465 people in 1840. In 1876, the Eems Canal was dug and development of the village stagnated. Garnwerd was part of the municipality of Ezinge. In 1990, it became part of Winsum. In 2019, it became part of the municipality of Westerkwartier

== Gallery ==
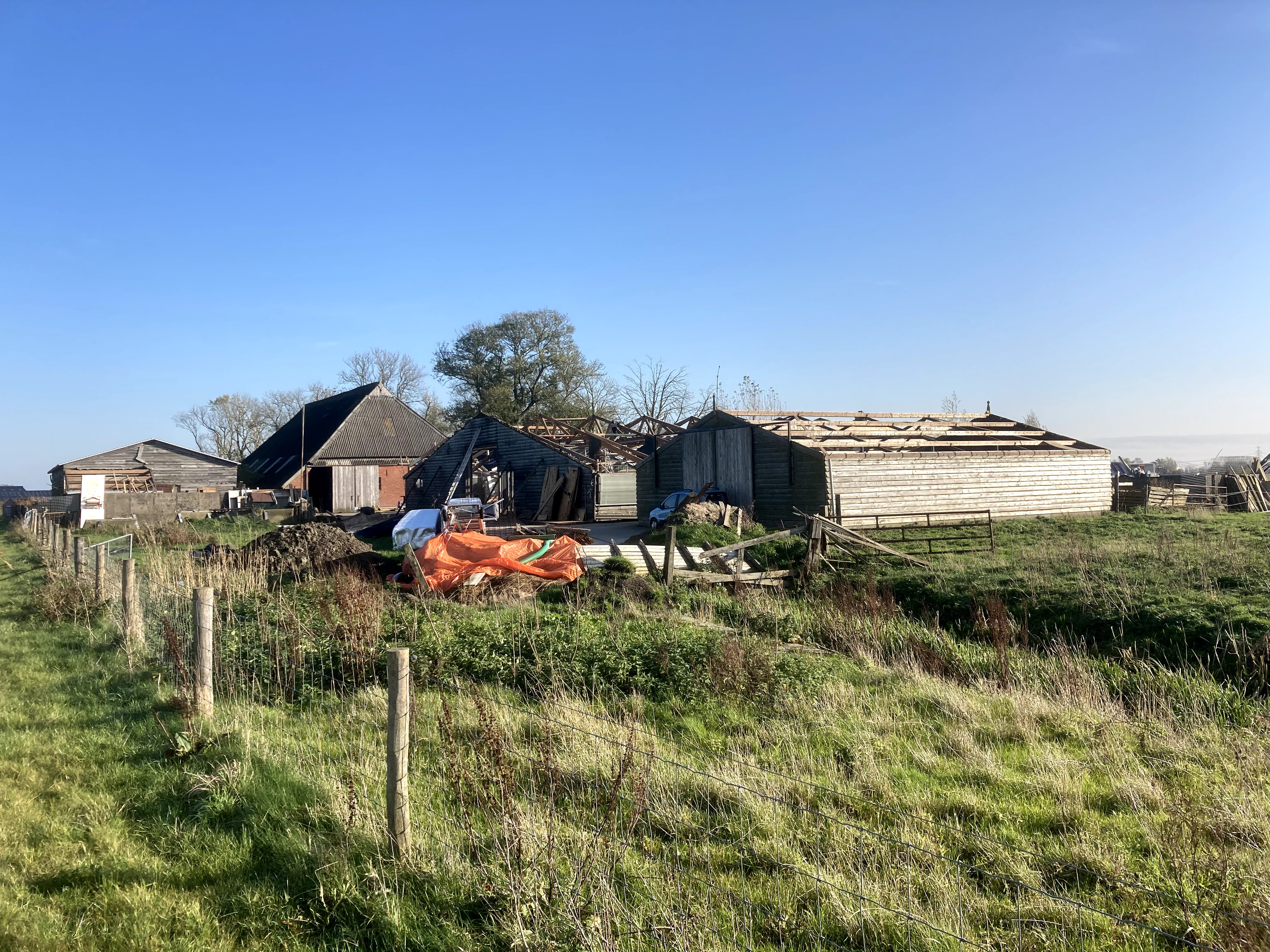
Barn construction in Garnwerd

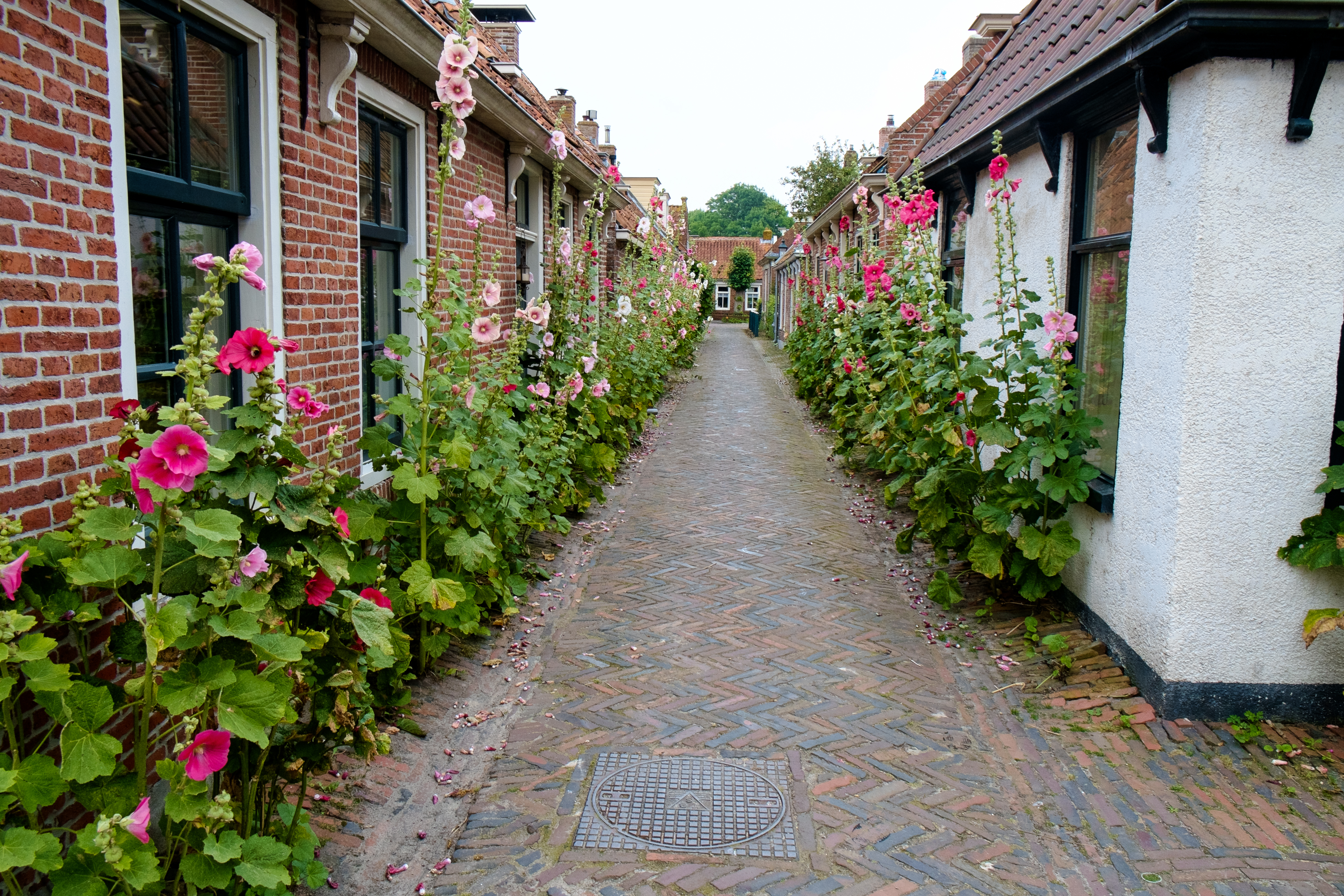
Alley in Garnwerd

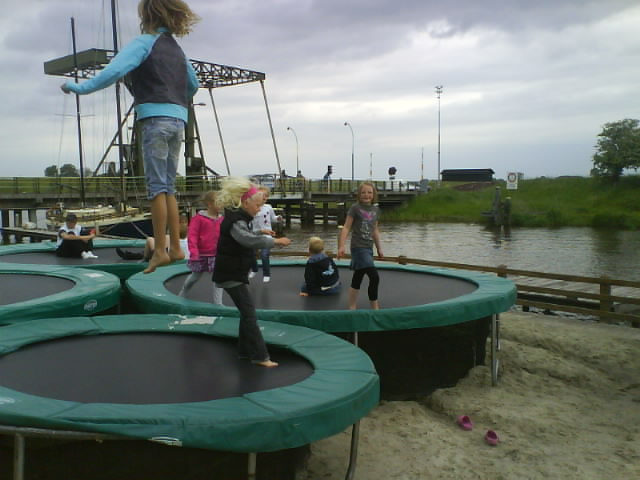
Children's playground

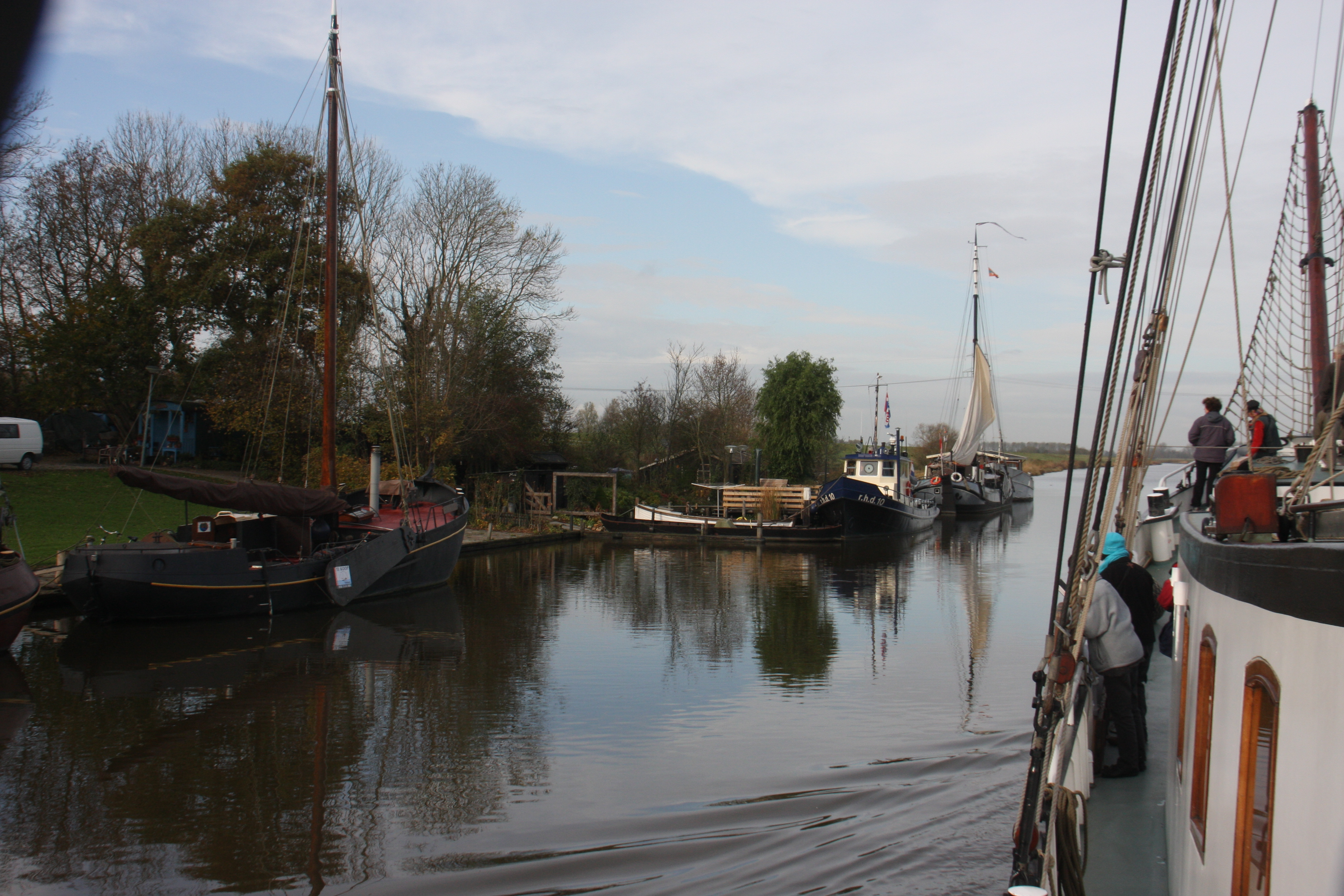
Harbour of Garnwerd
