= Delfzijl =

Delfzijl Delfsiel (Gronings)
- City
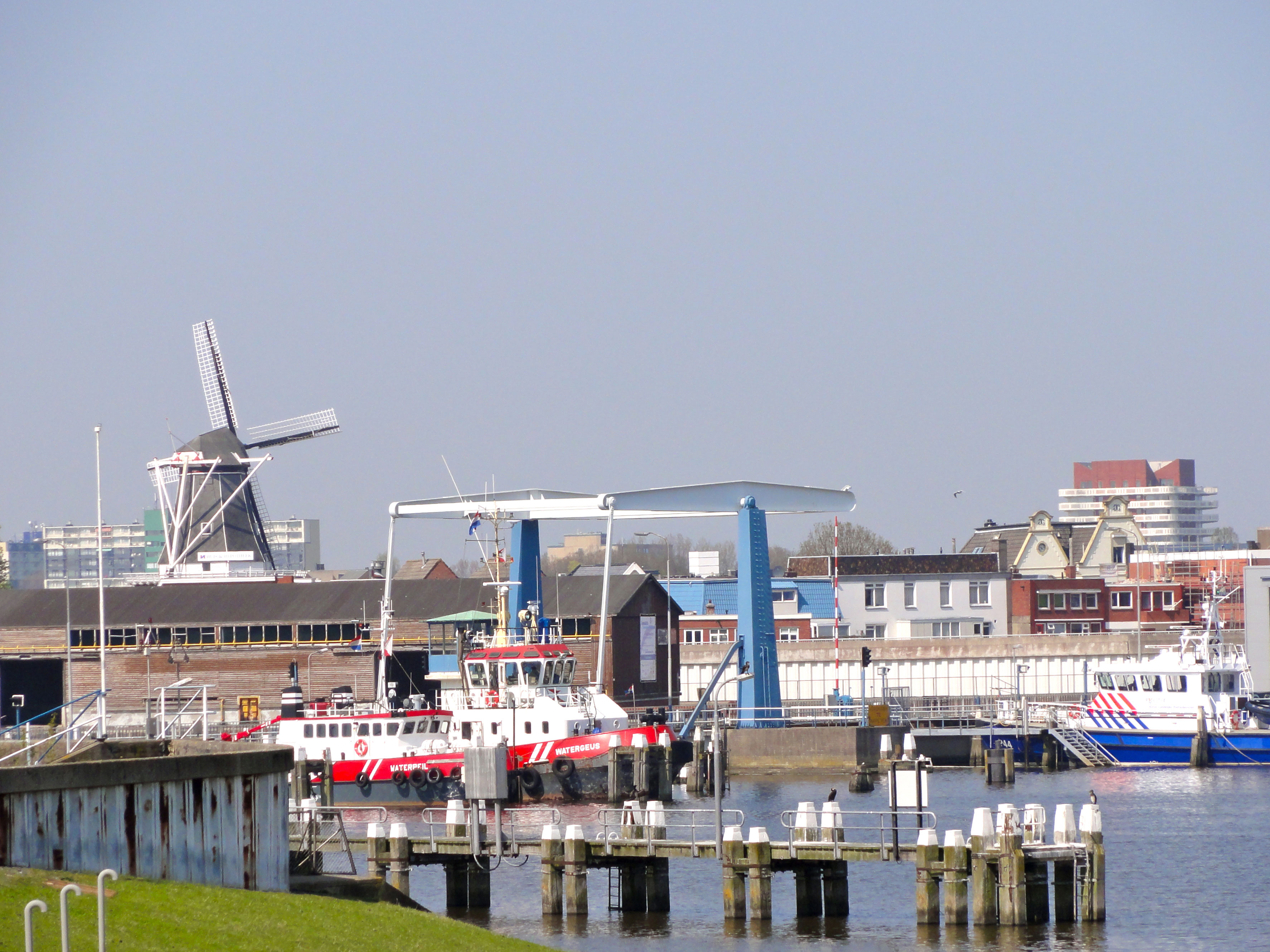
- Skyline of Delfzijl in 2011

- Flag Coat of arms

- Location in the province of Groningen
- Coordinates: 53°20′N 6°55′E
- Country: Netherlands
- Province: Groningen
- Municipality: Eemsdelta

Area
  - Total: 227.50 km^{2} (87.84 sq mi)
  - Land: 133.07 km^{2} (51.38 sq mi)
  - Water: 94.43 km^{2} (36.46 sq mi)
- Elevation: 1 m (3.3 ft)

Population (January 2021)
  - Total: data missing
- Demonym: Delfzijler
- Time zone: UTC+1 (CET)
  - Summer (DST): UTC+2 (CEST)
- Postcode: Parts of 9900 range
- Area code: 0596

Delfzijl (Dutch: [dɛl(ə)fˈsɛil]; Gronings: Delfziel [dɛlfˈsil]) is a city and former municipality (which now belongs to the municipality of Eemsdelta) with a population of 25,651 in the province of Groningen in the northeast of the Netherlands. Delfzijl was a sluice between the Delf and the Ems, which became fortified settlement in the 16th century. The fortifications were removed in the late 19th century. Delfzijl is the fifth largest seaport in the Netherlands, and the largest port in the North East of the country.

== Etymology ==
The name Delfzijl means 'sluice of the Delf'. The Delf was a canal connecting the rivers Fivel and Ems, and is now part of the Damsterdiep. The Dutch verb delven means 'to delve' or 'to dig' and the Dutch noun zijl means 'water outlet' or 'sluice'.

== History ==
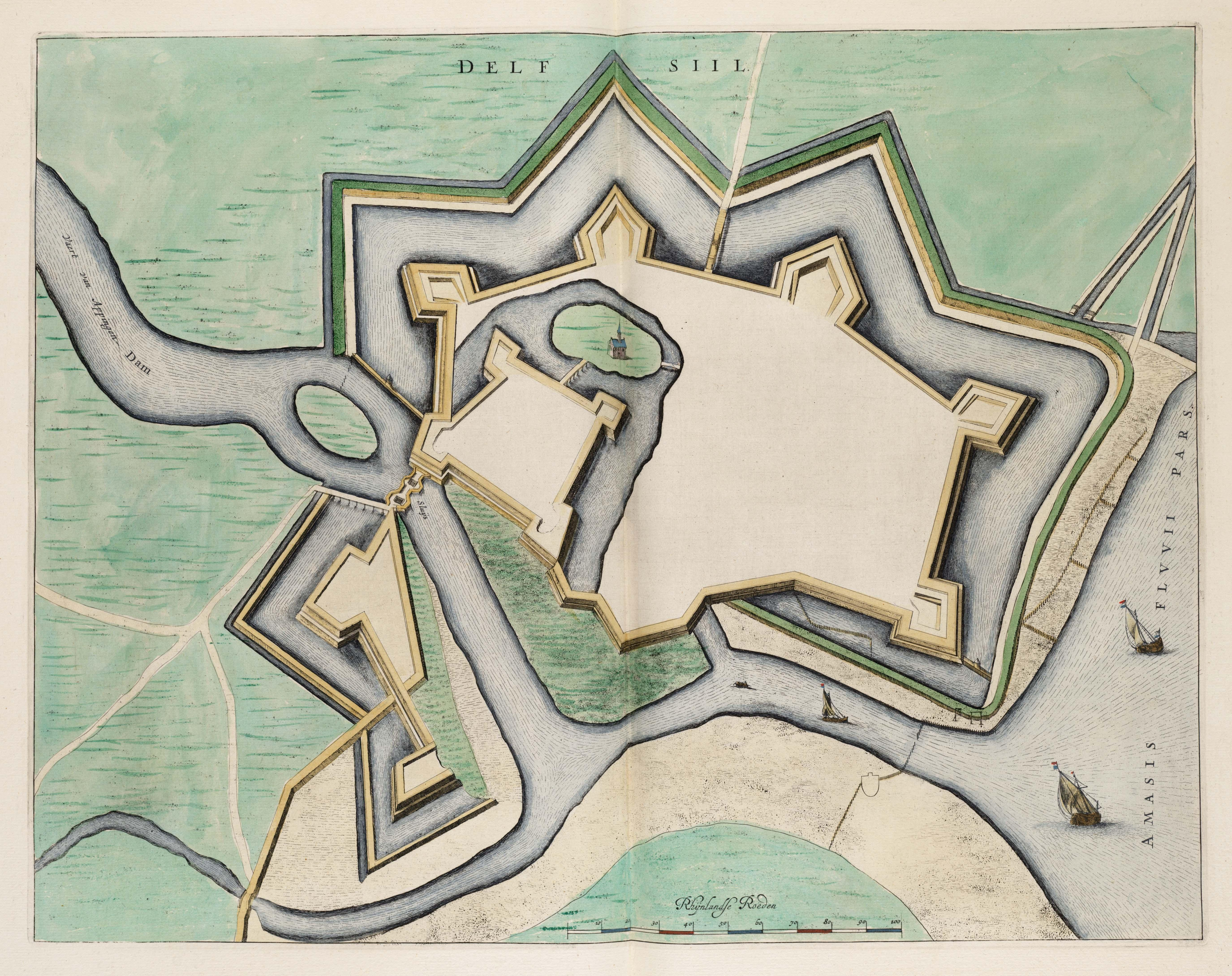
Map of the fortifications of Delfzijl from the Atlas Van Loon (1649)

Delfzijl was established at the location where three sluices (Dutch: zijlen) were connected. In 1317, a sluice was built in the Delf, a canal which is now part of the Damsterdiep. Delfzijl has been the main sea port of Groningen since medieval times.

In 1580, a square sconce and a church were built in Delfzijl. Fortification was expanded with six bastions in 1591. Also In 1591 Prince Maurice of Orange visited the port with a fleet of 150 ships which saw the capture of the city from the Spanish by a combined Dutch and English army. Following this an unsuccessful attempt was made in 1594 by Francisco Verdugo to capture the fortress Delfzijl. In 1628 Piet Hein moored his silver fleet at Delfzijl. The first sea battle in the Eighty Years' War was fought nearby in 1658 in the Eems estuary between Dutch forces under Jan Abels and Spanish forces under François van Boshuizen. A fleet of Dutch ships from the West Indies landed here in 1665 under command of admiral Michiel de Ruyter, avoiding the English fleet that was blockading the Dutch coast. The fortification and the sluices were damaged during the Christmas Flood of 1717. In 1813–1814, the French held the city, while it was under siege by the Dutch. The fortifications were removed in 1875, making room for the train station, and leaving one branch of the moat for recreational purposes, with ice skating in some years.

The town was damaged in World War II, and artifacts of the battle can be found in monuments, bunkers, and old armored vehicles usually on display, but disrupted now since 2017 by a major reconstruction of the water front area. Nearby a group of museums attractively landscaped near woodlands and an indoor public swimming pool, an aquarium, and a sea dike, are also affected by the construction intending to make Delfzijl a better tourist attraction after the construction and more secure from sea flooding.

Delfzijl sits at an elevation above low tide, and usually above high tide except for a few days per year. The town is protected by dikes and gates that can be opened to let water out at low tide, and closed to prevent flooding at high tide. When normal draining at low tide is not sufficient water is pumped near Delfzijl at Farmsum in a modern pumping station that replaced the historical old pump house in the 1970s. The possibility of rising sea level is a large concern in Delfzijl, and storms have occasionally splashed water over the sea dikes in recent years causing the dike to be raised starting in 2017.

Traditional industries of grain milling, paper made from straw, and bricks made from clay have given way to newer industries and technologies. Colonial days are remembered in Delfzijl by Indonesian food and a variety of minority groups who are integrated into the community.

On the edge of Delfzijl, and easily approached on foot or by bicycle across new parks and wood lands, the church at Uitwierde with its free standing tower dates from about the year 1200. The church sits on a historic protected artificial mound that dates from antiquity, and was necessary before dikes were built. The church pipe organ dates from 1888 and was moved from Heveskes in 1975. In the area are a few estates and manor houses with historic restaurants of interest as well as numerous farm houses and villages with old churches of historic interest.

Industrial expansion in the 1970s and 1980s displaced old villages of Weiwerd and Heveskes which are remembered in photos and local monuments maintained by previous residents. Foundations of a ruined monastery were discovered in the excavations of Heveskes mound, together with a monolithic tomb dated from 3400 BC which was disrupted about 2200 BC and was displayed in the Aquarium Museum at Delfzijl, until recent developments caused the building to be demolished. The monastery was mentioned in records of 1319, and was destroyed in war in 1586. The village of Oterdum which was built against an older section of sea dike was flooded occasionally by storms and was demolished in the 1970s for raising the dike elevation. Coffins traditionally buried in the old dike were moved to Farmsum, leaving monuments in the enlarged dike to commemorate the village and cemetery. A few Kilometers farther down the coast are the villages of Borgsweer and Termunten that give some idea of the traditional land use before industrial expansion. Nearby at Termunterzijl is located a gate in the sea dike and a small marina inside the fresh water harbor, giving an idea of how Delfzijl looked in the early years.

== Geography ==
2015 map of the municipality

Delfzijl is located at 53°20′N 6°55′E in the northeast of the province of Groningen, in the northeast of the Netherlands. It is situated on the southwest bank of the Ems estuary, which forms the border with Germany.

Delfzijl was bordered by the Dutch municipalities of Eemsmond (in the northwest), Loppersum (west), Appingedam (west), Slochteren (southwest), Oldambt (south), and by the German municipalities of Emden (east) and Krummhörn (northeast).

The former municipality contained the population centres:

- Bierum
- Biessum
- Borgsweer
- Delfzijl
- Farmsum
- Godlinze
- Holwierde
- Krewerd
- Losdorp
- Meedhuizen
- Spijk
- Termunten
- Termunterzijl
- Uitwierde
- Wagenborgen
- Weiwerd
- Woldendorp

== Economy ==
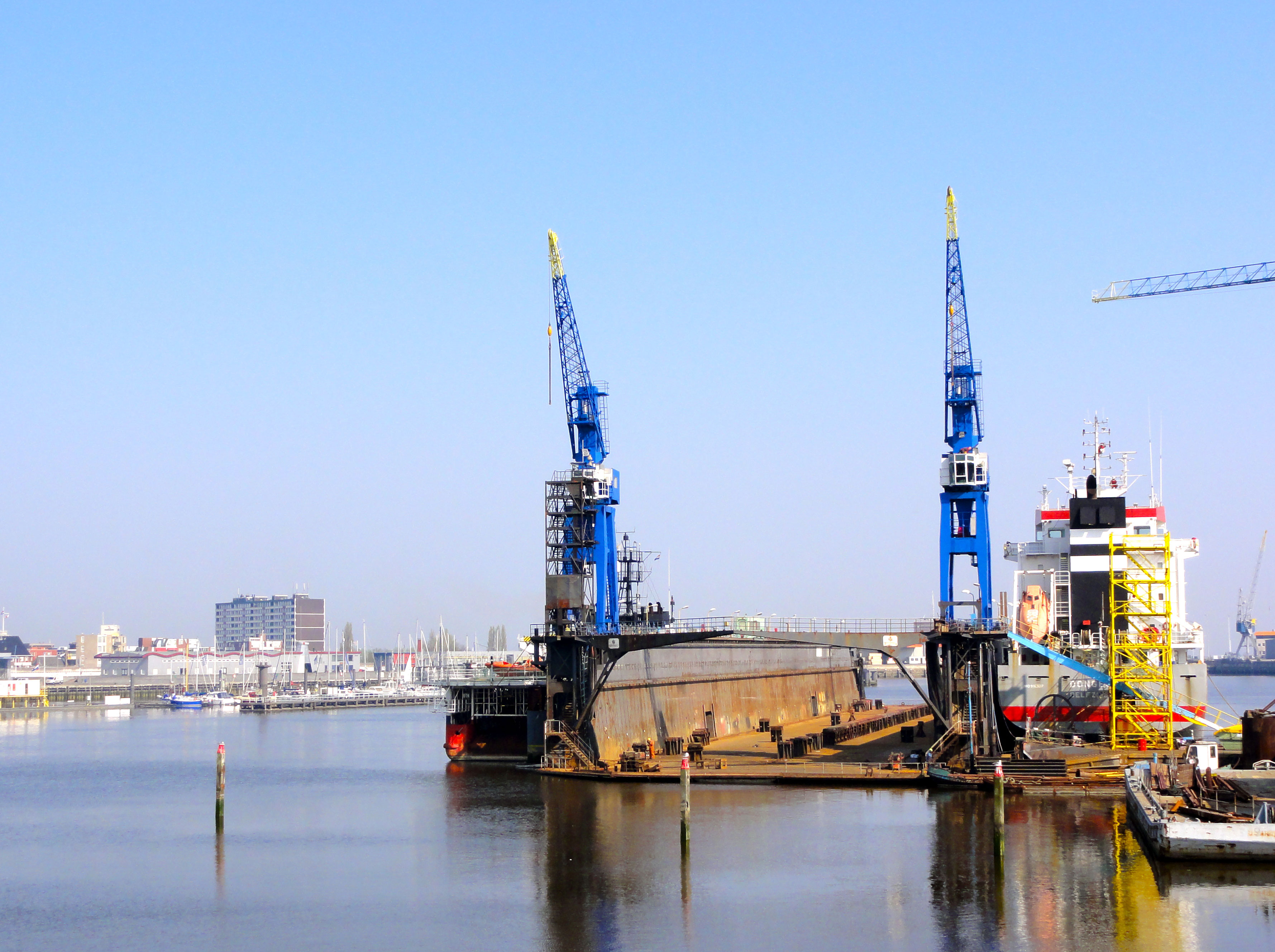
Port of Delfzijl in 2011

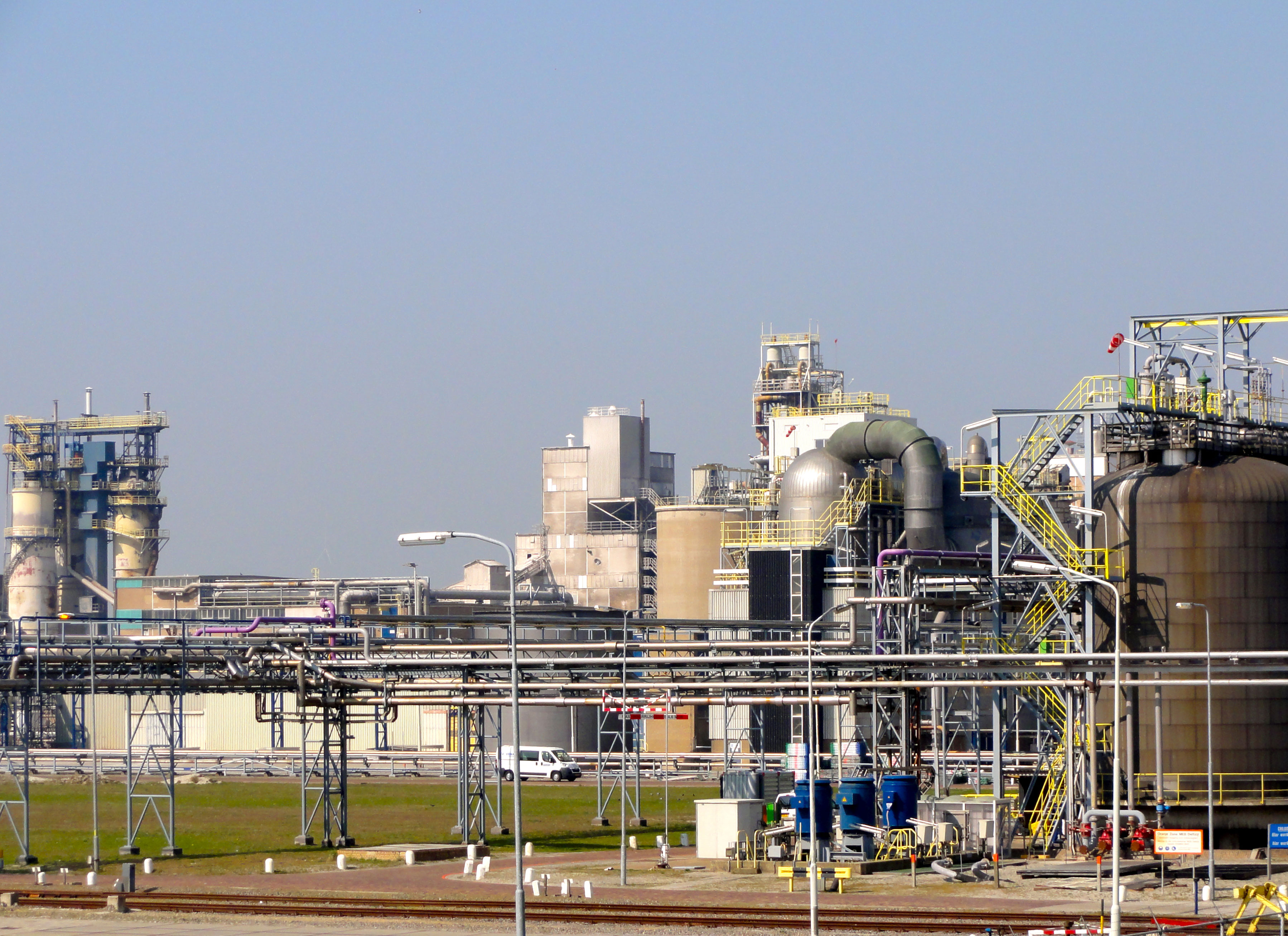
Chemie Park Delfzijl in 2011

The Port of Delfzijl is the fifth biggest seaport in the Netherlands and the home of an aluminium plant run by the company Aluminium Delfzijl (part of Tata Steel Europe). In 2004 the smelter produced a record 112,400 tonnes of liquid aluminium. The foundry produced 157,700 tonnes of raw product. Natural gas and petroleum fields in the area encourage industries to locate in the industrial zones.

Delfzijl is also known for its chemical industry and a large salt production plant held by AkzoNobel . On the edge of the town lies an industrial site with an area of 3 square kilometers which is one of the biggest employers in the area. This site is responsible for the second largest quantity of exported chemicals in the Netherlands (after Rotterdam), and is known for its major exports of chlorine and related products.

Favorable winds are used to make electricity in modern wind turbines located away from the historical districts. The old wind mills are only used on special occasions.

A modern fresh water shipping canal connects Delfzijl with Groningen City and most of The Netherlands, bypassing the historical canals that are used for recreation. Delfzijl has a strong tradition of seafaring and there is a specialized school to train employees for the shipping industry located nearby in the fresh water port area established in 1930. After some years at sea the graduates are highly regarded and recruited by local industry where they work as factory operators, mechanics, supervisors, or practical engineers. The inland fresh water port is extensive with several canals coming together, making a sheltered loading area and facilities for hauling out smaller ships for refitting and inspections.

Farmlands occupy most of the region producing potatoes, sugar beets, oil seeds, grain, dairy products, cattle and wool making Delfzijl a local market town and adding to the economy. Much commerce occurs with the agricultural center in Veendam that previously operated a chamber of commerce for the region. Building of small ships occurs along modern canals in nearby Winschoten, with rail and ship connections to Germany, adding to the commercial traffic around Delfzijl.

Fishing is done in the shallow seas with some of the boats operating out of Delfzijl and Farmsum harbor where much inland shipping is also handled. An old sea gate at Farmsum was replaced by newer gates nearby leaving a sheltered inland harbor. Low tide exposes extensive mud flats that add to tourism and environmental activities. Delfzijl is a bird sanctuary during high tides that cover the feeding grounds with sea water.

Considerable lumber is imported to supplement domestic supplies. A wide variety of cargoes from all over the world are handled by the port, which also receives visiting navy ships from NATO countries. Delfzijl harbors can accommodate boats of various types as well as small to medium-sized ships. Large ships can be handled in the new Eemshaven port near by at the mouth of the Eems estuary. Together the two harbors are promoted as industrial development areas under the name Groningen Province Sea Ports. The two ports give regular service to north sea petroleum production and staging grounds for new constructions in the north sea fields.

== Transportation ==
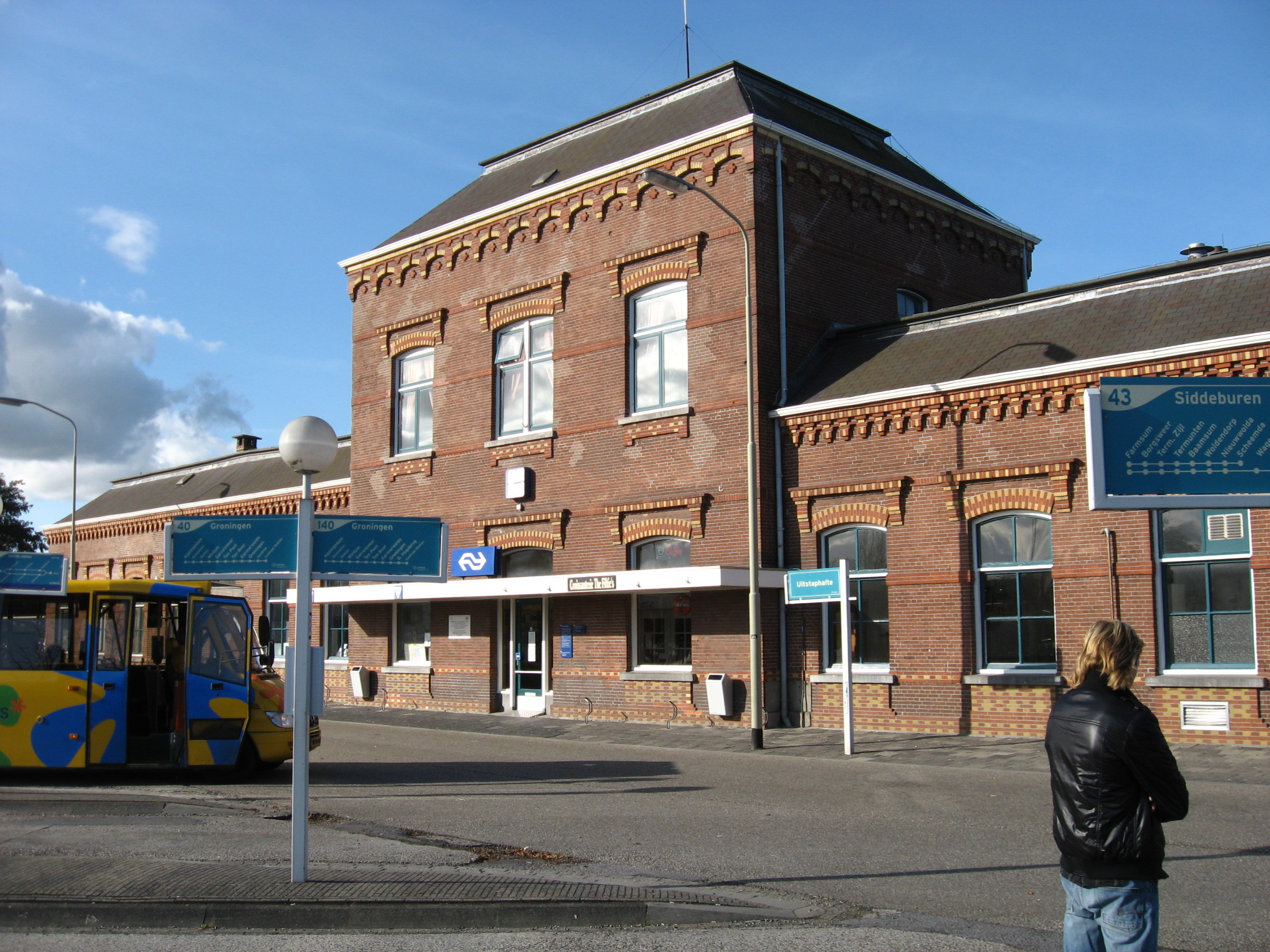
Delfzijl railway station in 2009

There are two railway stations in municipality giving frequent service to Groningen and points in between, with connections to other locations:

- Delfzijl railway station
- Delfzijl West railway station

A branch of the railroad tracks passes through gates in the sea dike to serve the harbor area and near by industries.

The regional airport of Groningen at Eelde serves Delfzijl and the surrounding areas.

Local and regional busses connect Delfzijl to outlying villages and other towns. The large trucking company Lommerts has offices and terminals in Delfzijl harbor area connecting with sea going traffic.

Modern highways link Delfzijl with destinations in Europe, and easy access to inland resort areas near Gieten in Drenthe on weekends. A system of old and new draw bridges manages the flow of traffic across canals and around locks where water level is raised and lowered. Parking space is provided in various places, some of which impose a time limit and require a permit that can be purchased inexpensively. Some parking permits are also valid in other places of The Netherlands and foreign countries.

Delfzijl provides bicycle paths and traffic signals for pedestrians and cyclists. Special permissions and permits apply to small motor bikes not more than 50cc motor displacement or electric power not more than 4 kilowatts traveling not more than 45 kilometers per hour and within the local speed limit on streets and roads where they are allowed. Other permissions apply to larger motorbikes which are usually found with automobile traffic. Many people prefer to walk in Delfzijl which is made possible by reasonable distances, low crime rate, and mild maritime climate that is often cloudy, cool, wet, and windy.

== Events ==
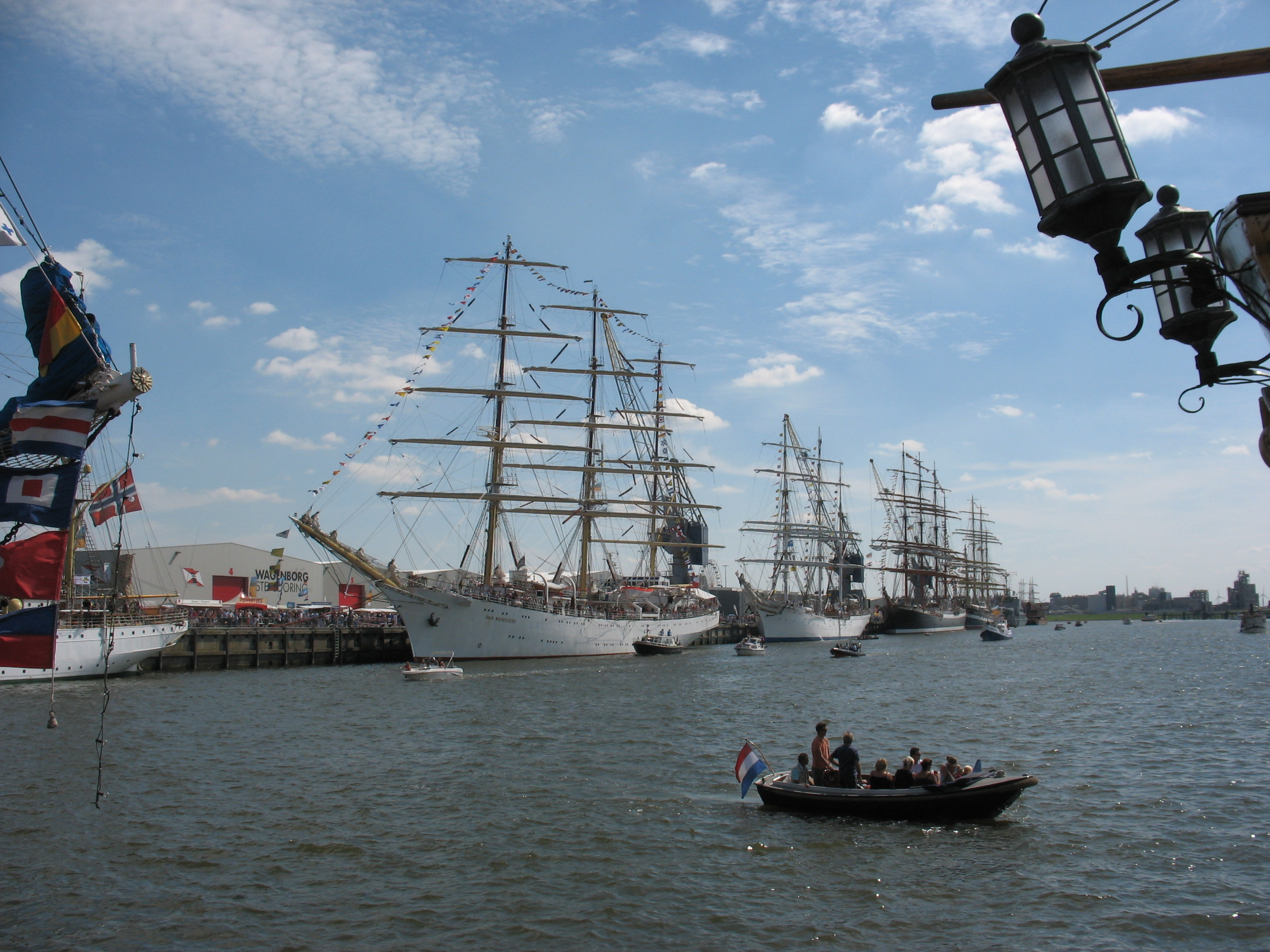
Ships at DelfSail in 2009

Every five years the city organises DelfSail, the second-largest sailing event of the Netherlands after SAIL Amsterdam. Part of the sea harbor near the center of Delfzijl is open to public on Sundays and special events are occasionally held when the heavy machinery is not moving and the sea gates are not closed.

Annually the "Pinksterfeesten" (Whitsunfestivities or Pentecost Festival) are organised in the city. Delfzijl is seeing a strong resurgence in the Dutch economy as the physical centerpoint of Energy Valley. This is the result of a strategic collaboration with the German town of Emden on the other side of the Eems Estuary, and North Sea natural gas that comes on shore near Delfzijl.

== Society ==
Delfzijl has a cultural center with meeting rooms, cinema, theater, and concert hall near the central wind mill for live performances and films, with additional cultural facilities in Groningen.

Education is available for people of all ages including those who travel to nearby Groningen University. Parents of school aged children participate in school activities several times a year around national holidays and school year schedules. Affordable health care is provided to everyone in, clinics, house calls, at a local hospital, and at the Groningen Academic Hospital which was established in 1797.

Government officials are mostly appointed and operate with advice of elected local councils and parliaments in Groningen and The Hague. Authorities for public safety, city services, oversight of industry, harbor control, and management of water levels have a strong presence in Delfzijl and can call on assistance from trained volunteers when needed. Many political parties are active in Delfzijl, with much support given to labor, business, education, religious views, family values, and environmental protection. Small business shop keepers have a large influence on the city. There is much freedom of speech and action for people who are respectful of laws and authorities.

Many social activities take place in cafes, pubs, churches, and sports clubs. The residents keep their window blinds open at home in celebration of long lasting peace, but are otherwise protective of privacy. Most religious activities of Delfzijl are in the Dutch Protestant Established (Hervormde Kerk) or Reformed (Gereformeerde Kerk) churches, with notable minorities active in Catholic, Lutheran, and Baptist churches. Most of the churches in Delfzijl are joined in local and national organizations, although they retain much of their individual character. Salvation army is also active and included in the churches organization. A number of national holidays are celebrated each year, the biggest are Christmas, Easter, and the King's Birthday. Sports facilities are available and boating is popular in the sea, canals, and near by lakes.

Housing and commerce in Delfzijl is a blending of old and new facilities with architectural attention given to the unity and harmony of the town's appearance. New housing on the north side and west side of Delfzijl retain elements of traditional styles while providing modern facilities. Ownership in different parts of Delfzijl is also a blend of private and public property.

Modern Dutch language is understood everywhere and young educated people speak English, German, and French. Gronings dialect is found routinely spoken in outlying villages, resembling old dialects along the coast nearby in Germany and Denmark. Local television carries Dutch and popular broadcasts from other countries and languages. Delfzijl is accustomed to receiving visitors and guest workers from foreign countries.

== People from Delfzijl ==
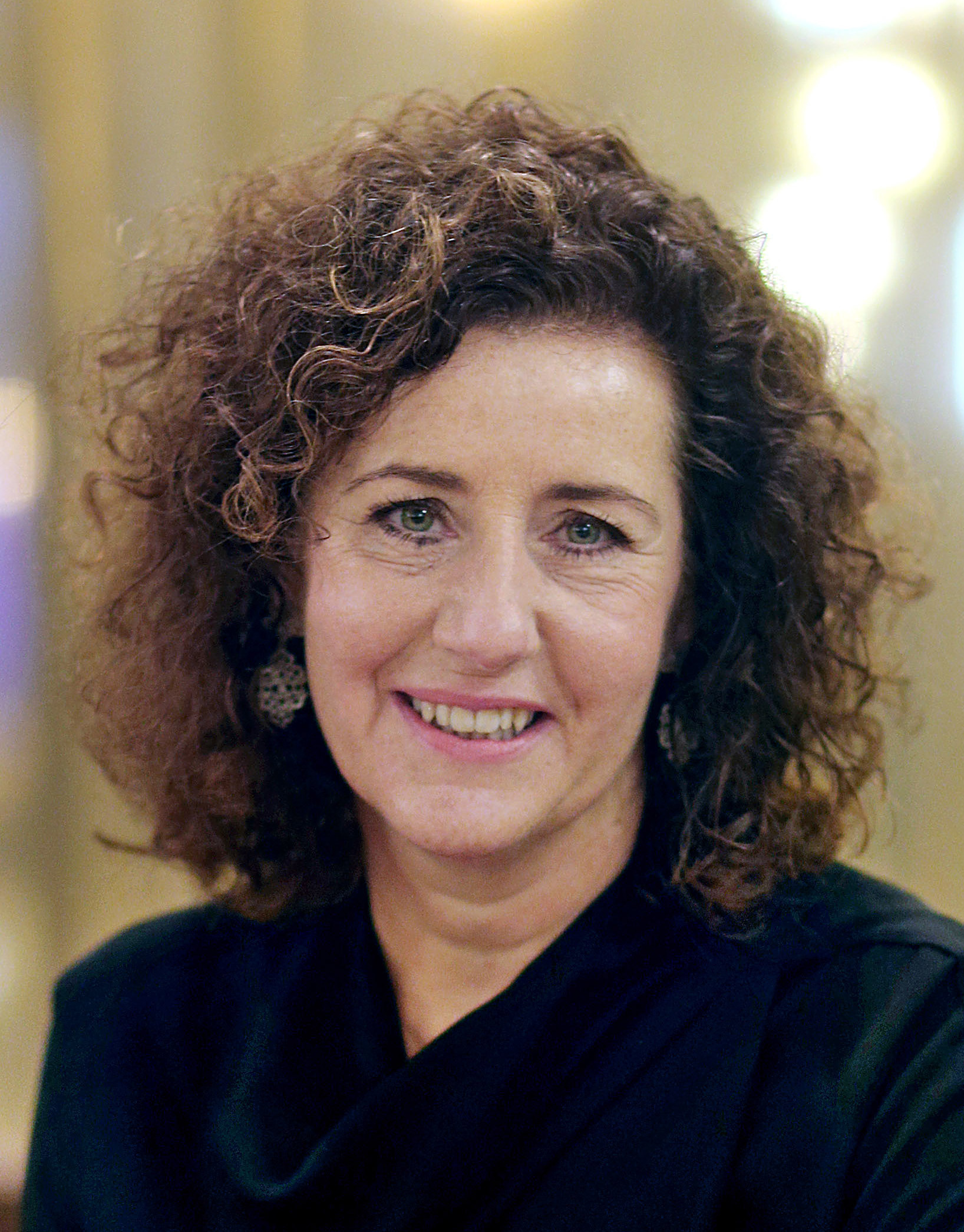
Ingrid van Engelshoven, 2017

- Gerard Diephuis (1817 in Farmsum – 1892) a Dutch jurist and academic
- Anette Poelman (1853 in Holwierde - 1914) a Dutch suffragist and philanthropist
- Willem de Mérode (1887 in Spijk – 1939) pseudonym of the Dutch poet, Willem Eduard Keuning
- Allard Oosterhuis (1902–1967), Dutch resistance hero during World War II
- Bonno Spieker (1935–2017), a former ship's engineer, later a politician
- Lenie 't Hart (born 1941 in Farmsum) a Dutch animal caretaker and animal rights activist
- Ivo Opstelten (born 1944) a retired Dutch politician and jurist, Mayor of Delfzijl 1980/87
- Henk van Hoof (born 1947) a retired politician, former naval officer and Mayor of Delfzijl 2003/4
- Janneke Snijder-Hazelhoff (born 1952) a Dutch farmer and politician
- Ingrid van Engelshoven (born 1966), politician, management consultant and former civil servant
- Florentijn Hofman (born 1977), a Dutch artist who creates playful urban installations

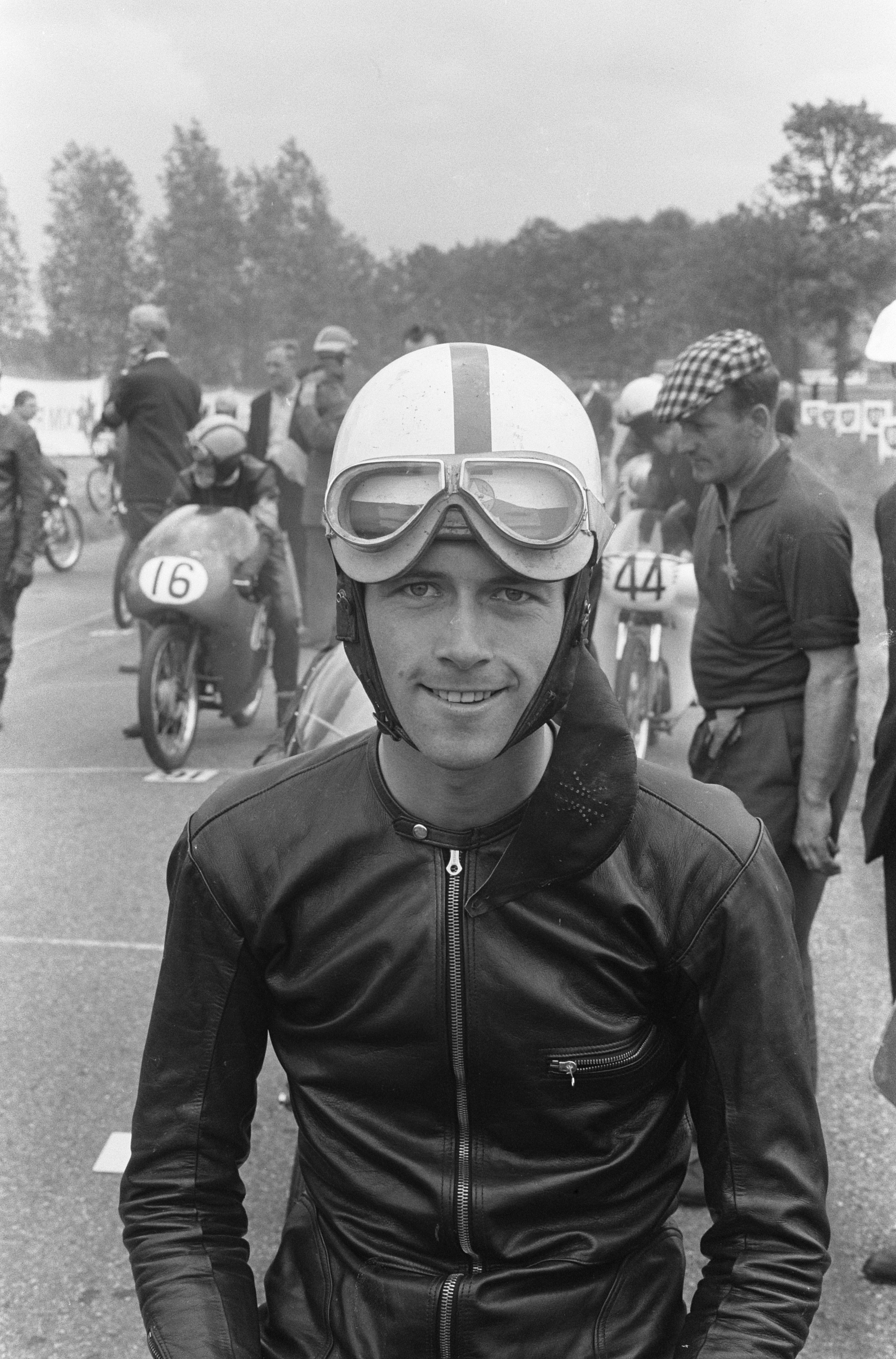
Jan Huberts, 1962

=== Sport ===
- Jan Huberts (1937–2016), Grand Prix motorcycle road racer
- Jan Boven (born 1972), former road cyclist
- Bob Mulder (born 1974), former footballer with 117 club caps
- Loes Markerink (born 1985), road cyclist
- Mart Dijkstra (born 1990), a Dutch footballer, over 200 club caps

== International relations ==
Delfzijl is twinned with:

- Shūnan, Yamaguchi, Japan
- Cesenatico, Italy
