= Bierum =

- Village
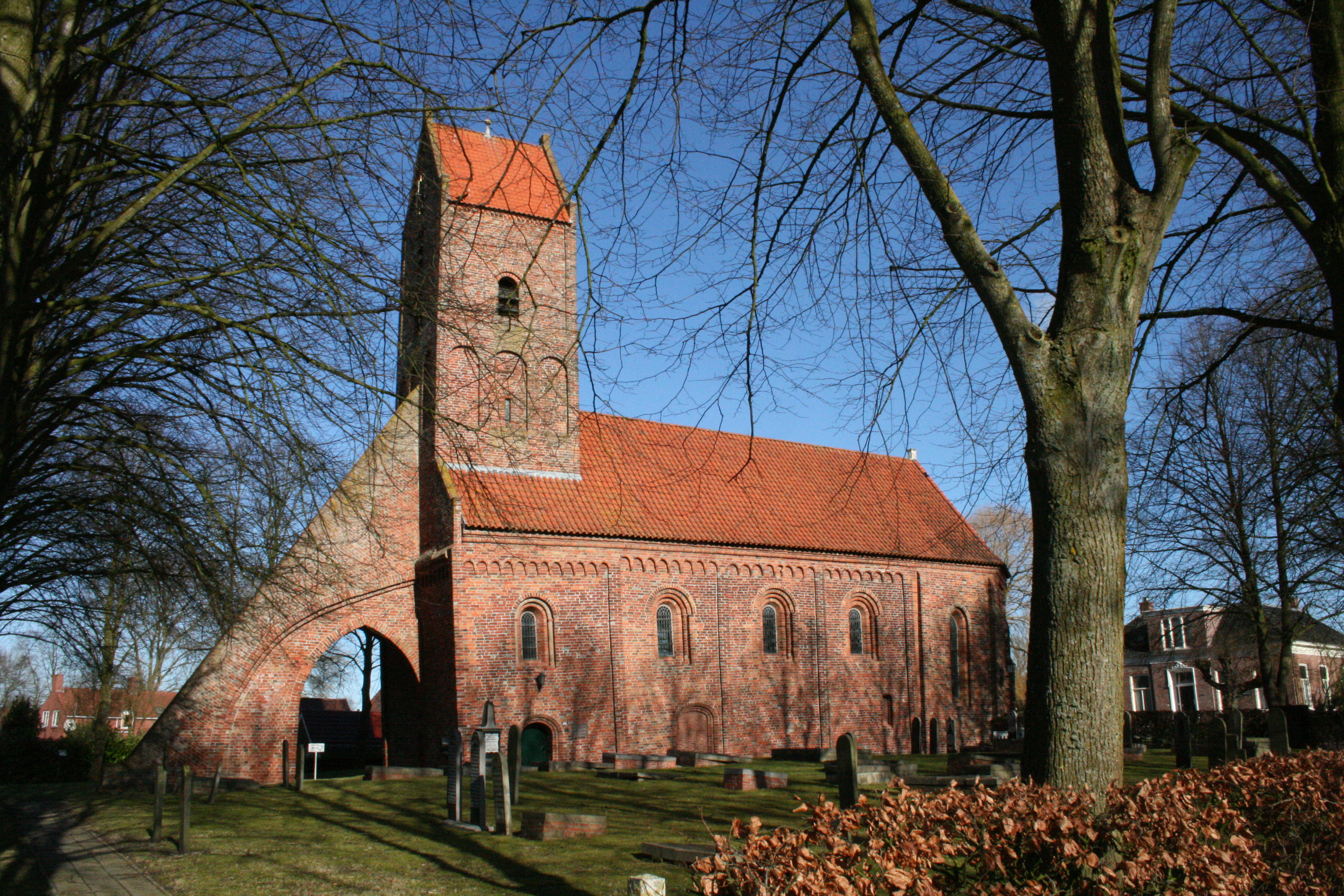
- Protestant Sebastian Church in 2009

- Flag Coat of arms

- Location in the province of Groningen in the Netherlands Bierum (Netherlands)
- Coordinates: 53°23′N 6°52′E
- Country: Netherlands
- Province: Groningen
- Municipality: Eemsdelta

Population (2017)
  - Total: 673
- Time zone: UTC+1 (CET)
  - Summer (DST): UTC+2 (CEST)
- Postal code: 9906
- Dialing code: 0596

Bierum (Dutch pronunciation: [ˈbiːrʏm]; Gronings: Baaierm [ˈbɑːiərm]) is a village in the Dutch province of Groningen. It is a part of the municipality of Eemsdelta, and lies about 27 km northeast of Groningen.

Bierum was a separate municipality until 1990, when it was merged with Delfzijl.

In 2017, the village of Bierum had 673 inhabitants. The built-up area of the village was 0.20 km^{2}, and contained 225 residences. The statistical area Bierum, which also includes the surrounding countryside, has a population of around 1,090 (not including the villages Spijk, Losdorp, Godlinze, Holwierde, and Krewerd).
