= Spijk =

Spijk may refer to several villages in the Netherlands:

- Spijk, Groningen, in the municipality of Eemsdelta, Groningen
- Spijk, North Brabant, in the municipality of Altena, North Brabant
- Spijk, West Betuwe, in the municipality of West Betuwe, Gelderland
- Spijk, Zevenaar, in the municipality of Zevenaar, Gelderland
