= Loes Heebink =

Dutch visual artist (born 1955)

- Born: 6 March 1955 (age 71); Utrecht, Netherlands
- Website: loesheebink.nl

Loes Heebink, also known as Loeske Heebink (born 6 March 1955), is a Dutch visual artist. She works in various media and has made artworks for public spaces.

== Life ==
Heebink was born in Utrecht. She trained at the Academie voor Beeldende Vorming in Amersfoort. From 1980 she lived and worked in Meppel and later in Kolderveen, where she lived and had her studio in 2024. From 1998 to 2002 she was curator of Semslinie, an art project along the provincial border between Groningen and Drenthe. She co-founded the Coöperatie De Venen in the former dairy factory in Kolderveen, with studio space and a stage for art from the Netherlands and abroad.

== Work ==
Her work in photography, film, video, installation and performance crosses the lines between art forms. She makes objects, photographs and videos linked to specific locations, using elements such as poetry, water, sound and light.

=== Public art ===
Bus-stops (1996), with Shlomo Schwarzberg, Oosterstraat, Groningen

Heebink often made works for public spaces together with other artists, including Carlo Kroon and Shlomo Schwarzberg. With Schwarzberg she made the Bus-stops in the Oosterstraat and Gelkingestraat in Groningen in 1996, a commission from CBK Groningen within the municipal project Binnenstad Beter (Better City Centre). The work includes an electronic text sign hung between two stainless steel pillars, showing texts by the writer Jacques Brooijmans. The stop on the Oosterstraat has a transparent plastic heart in red neon light, the one on the Gelkingestraat a pair of green illuminated lungs; the heart stands for the city centre, the lungs for the suburbs. City buses ran past them until 2023. In an interview published in 2026, Heebink said the Bus-stops had been altered twice.

Also in 1996, Twee zitbanken (Two benches) by Heebink and Schwarzberg was installed on the Landlustlaan in Leidschendam-Voorburg. In 1998 Het Paalboek en Gebarentaal (The post book and sign language) was placed at the corner of the Julianaplein and the Schoolstraat in Roden.

The (F)luisterbank (Whispering/listening bench) of 2013 was given a place in the playground by the Lindenhof in the Blauwe Dorp, a neighbourhood in Groningen. The steel bench has two mirror-image halves; placing a hand on a pictured hand plays recorded stories by residents about the district. The plan came from local resident Jacqueline Pieters; Heebink designed the bench together with residents and the furniture designer Bart Kempinga.

=== Fluisteraars and Legacy ===
In 2018–2019 Heebink was asked to make a work for the hunting lodge Schloss Clemenswerth in Sögel. She made three hunting animals of plexiglass, a horse, a dog and a falcon, in an oval marked-off area, with a soundscape. The animals were life-size and made of "greencast", a recyclable type of plexiglass; the work was called Fluisteraars (Whisperers). In 2021 she showed it at the exhibition Contrast at the Havixhorst, together with work by two other artists. The exhibition was in part a tribute to Guus Hellegers, who had died in 2019; a week after the opening, fellow exhibitor Francesca Zijlstra also died.

Heebink then decided to destroy Fluisteraars herself and to make new work from it. She shredded the sculptures into plexi-as (plexi-ash), scattered the ash over pewter cups left by her mother and filmed this; the result was Legacy (Drinking from your cup). The idea for the short documentary Fluisteraars by the director Saskia Jeulink, about what happens to art once its maker is gone, also came from her; in the film Heebink destroys her own work. TV Noord broadcast the film on 31 March 2024, and TV Drenthe on 11 April 2024.

From 12 to 21 July 2024 the installation Legacy, a floor piece with two videos, was scheduled to be shown in the Rensenhut in the Rensenpark in Emmen. It was the first in a series of six planned exhibitions in that pavilion by members of Kuunst, an artists' collective from Drenthe.

== Gallery ==
Village marker at Borgsweer (2001–2004)

Rietvinkpaviljoen (Rietvink pavilion), with Shlomo Schwarzberg, Landlustlaan, Leidschendam-Voorburg
