= Bob Mulder =

Dutch footballer

Personal information
- Full name: Bob Mulder
- Date of birth: 31 January 1974 (age 52)
- Place of birth: Delfzijl, Netherlands
- Position: Midfielder

Senior career*
Years	Team	Apps	(Gls)
1995–1996	FC Groningen	6	(1)
1996–1997	MVV Maastricht	26	(1)
1997–1998	Heracles Almelo	8	(1)
1998–2000	BV Veendam	77	(21)
2001–2002	SV Meppen		
2002–2003	VfB Oldenburg		
- * Club domestic league appearances and goals

Bob Mulder (born 31 January 1974) is a retired professional footballer from the Netherlands, who played for clubs like FC Groningen, MVV Maastricht, Heracles Almelo and BV Veendam.
