= Uitwierde =

- Village
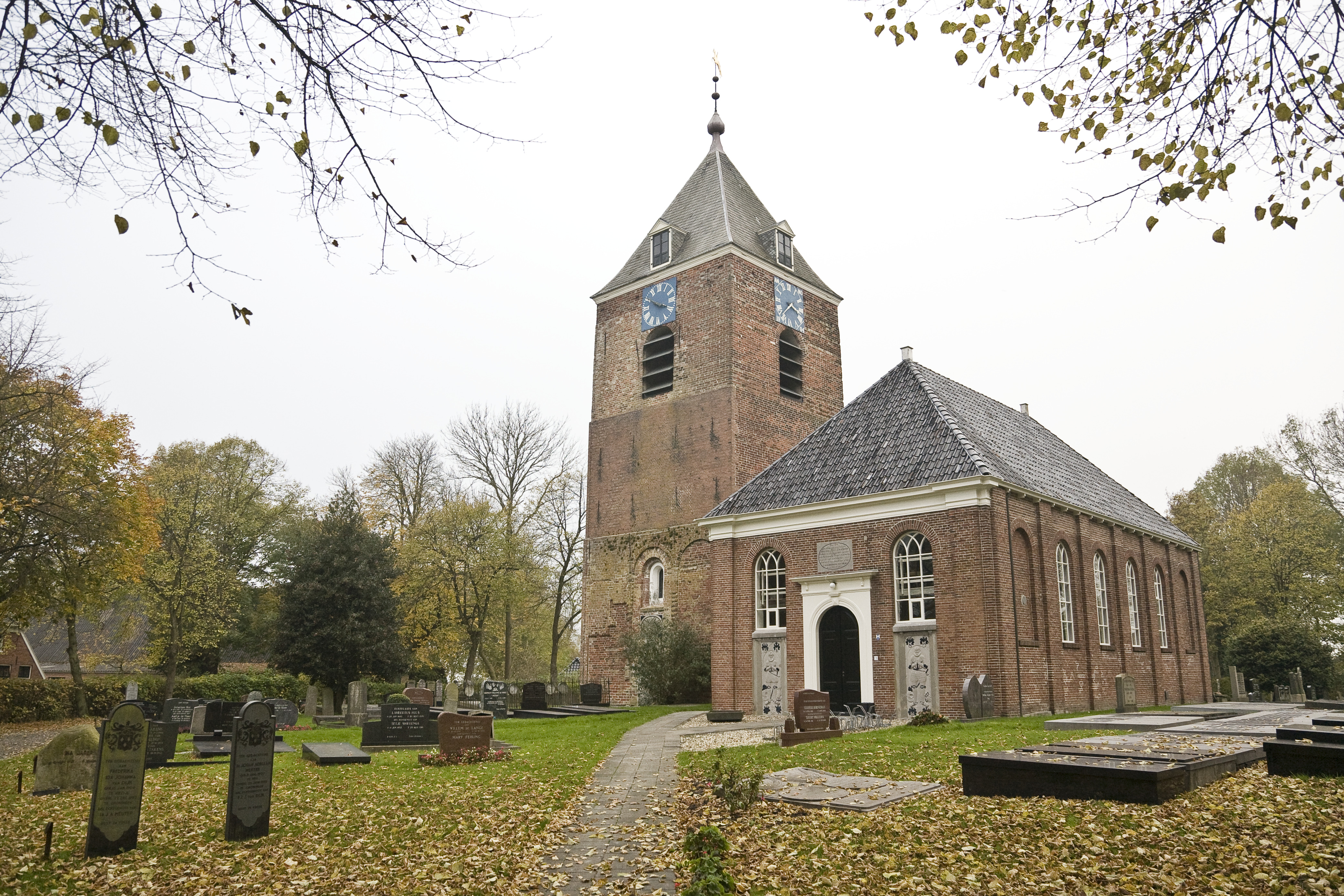
- Protestant Church in Uitwierde

- Location in the province of Groningen in the Netherlands Uitwierde (Netherlands)
- Coordinates: 53.34138°N 6.89532°E
- Country: Netherlands
- Province: Groningen
- Municipality: Eemsdelta

Area
  - Total: 0.07 km^{2} (0.027 sq mi)
- Elevation: 0.3 m (0.98 ft)

Population (2021)
  - Total: 60
  - Density: 860/km^{2} (2,200/sq mi)
- Time zone: UTC+1 (CET)
  - Summer (DST): UTC+2 (CEST)
- Postal code: 9931
- Dialing code: 0596

Uitwierde (Dutch pronunciation: [œytˈʋiːrdə]; Gronings: Oetwier [udˈʋiːɾ]) is a village in the Dutch province of Groningen. It is a part of the municipality of Eemsdelta, and lies about 26 km northeast of Groningen.

== History ==
The village was first mentioned in 1439 as "to Uutwierd", and means "outwards lying terp. Outwards is relative to the Ems river and the Dollart. Uitwierde is a terp (artificial living hill) village from the Early Middle Ages with a radial structure and an intact ring road.

Uitwierde was heavily damaged during the Siege of Delzijl from 1813 to 1814. Colonel Pierre Maufroy refused to accept the surrender of Napoleon and held on to Delfzijl. The six months siege by the Dutch, Prussian and English armies caused large destruction in the village of Uitwierde. The medieval church was destroyed, and a new church was built in 1839, however the tower from the 13th century has remained. The tower was scheduled to be demolished as well, however the farmer Jan Cornelis Bos pleaded for a restoration. The little person on horseback on the weather vane of the church is an image of Bos.

Uitwierde was home to 214 people in 1840.

Uitwierde is still an independent village, however it is nowadays directly to the northwest of the city of Delfzijl, and the postal authorities have placed under Delfzijl.

== Gallery ==
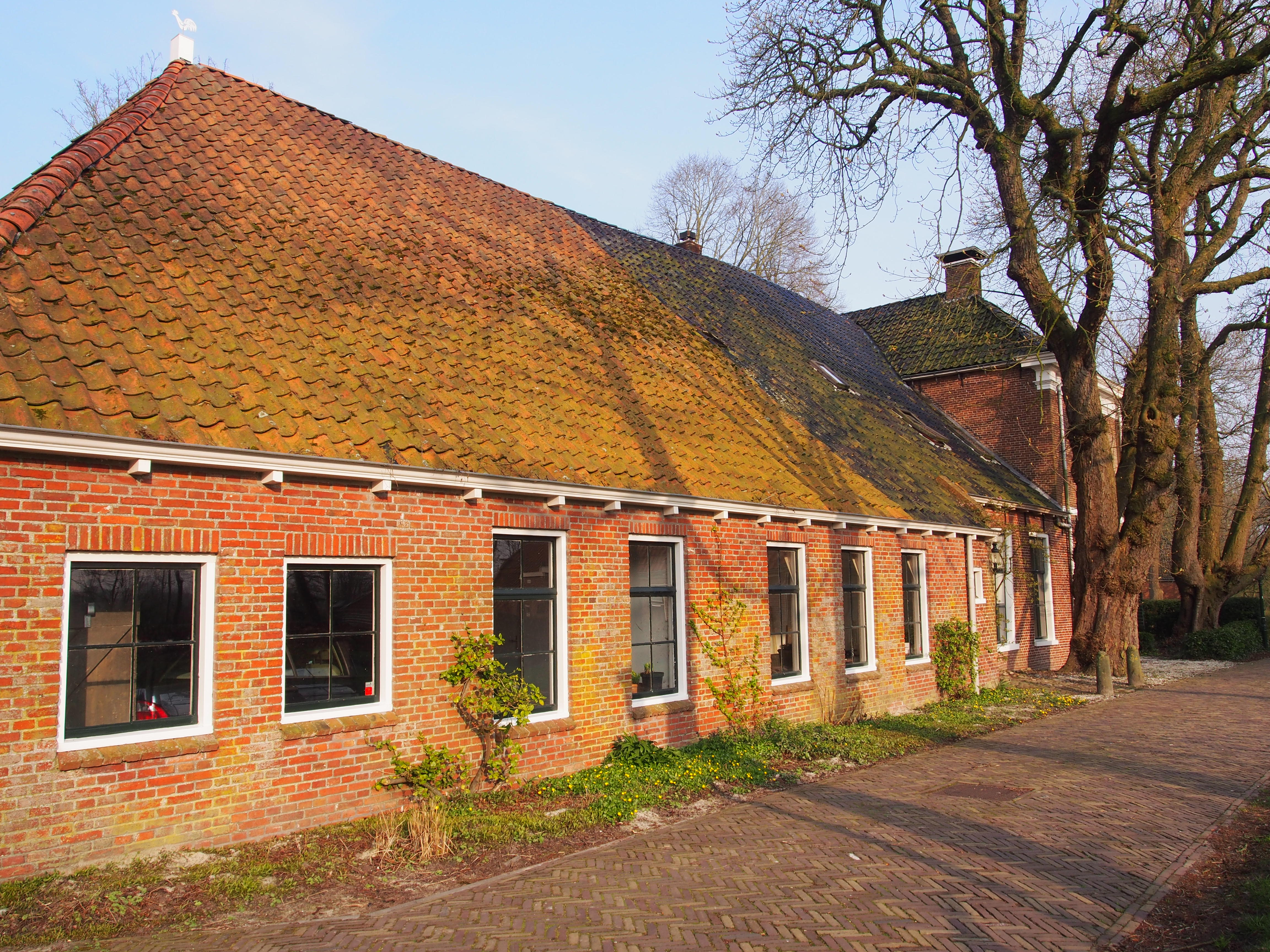
Farm in Uitwierde

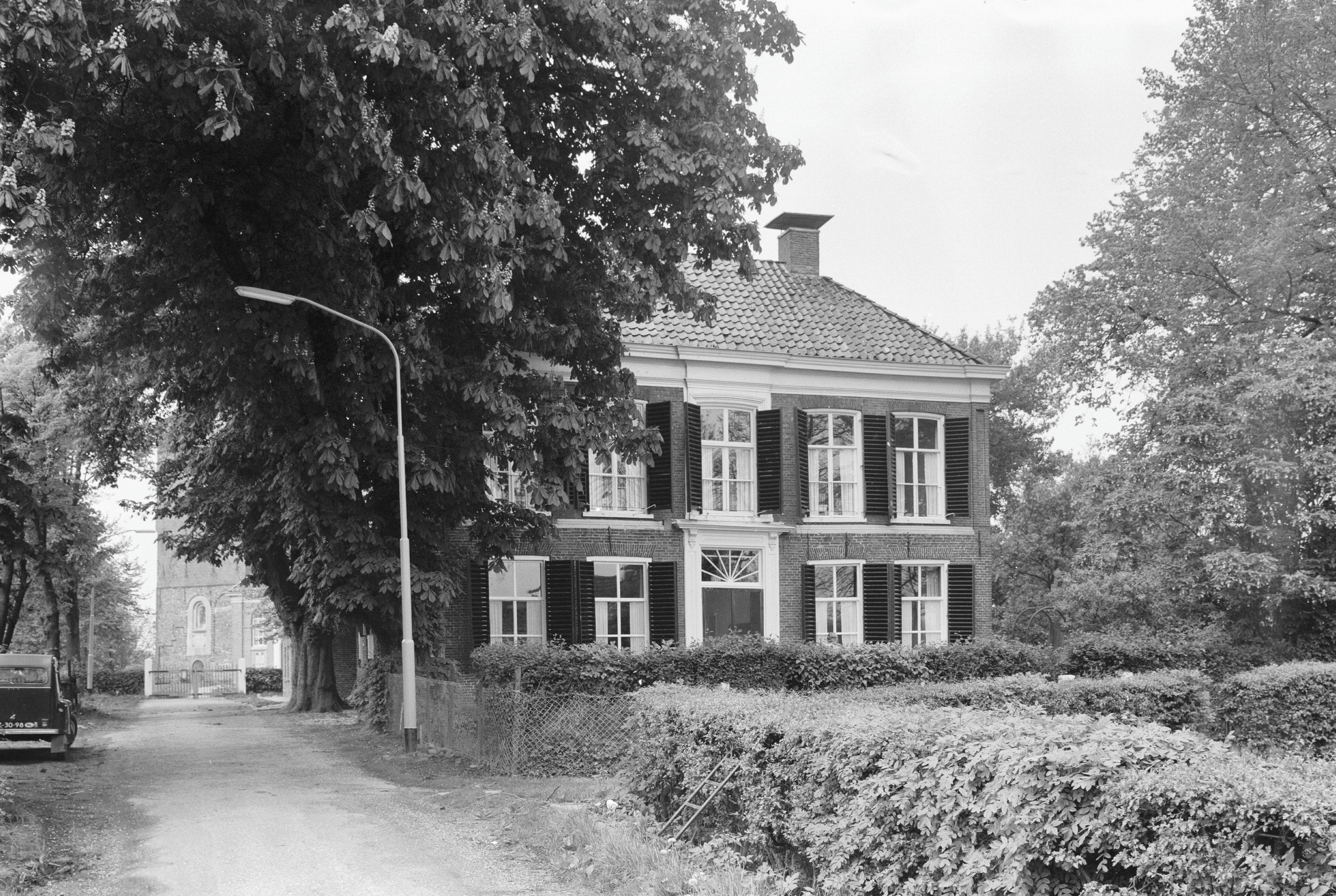
Villa in Uitwierde
