= Biessum =

- Hamlet
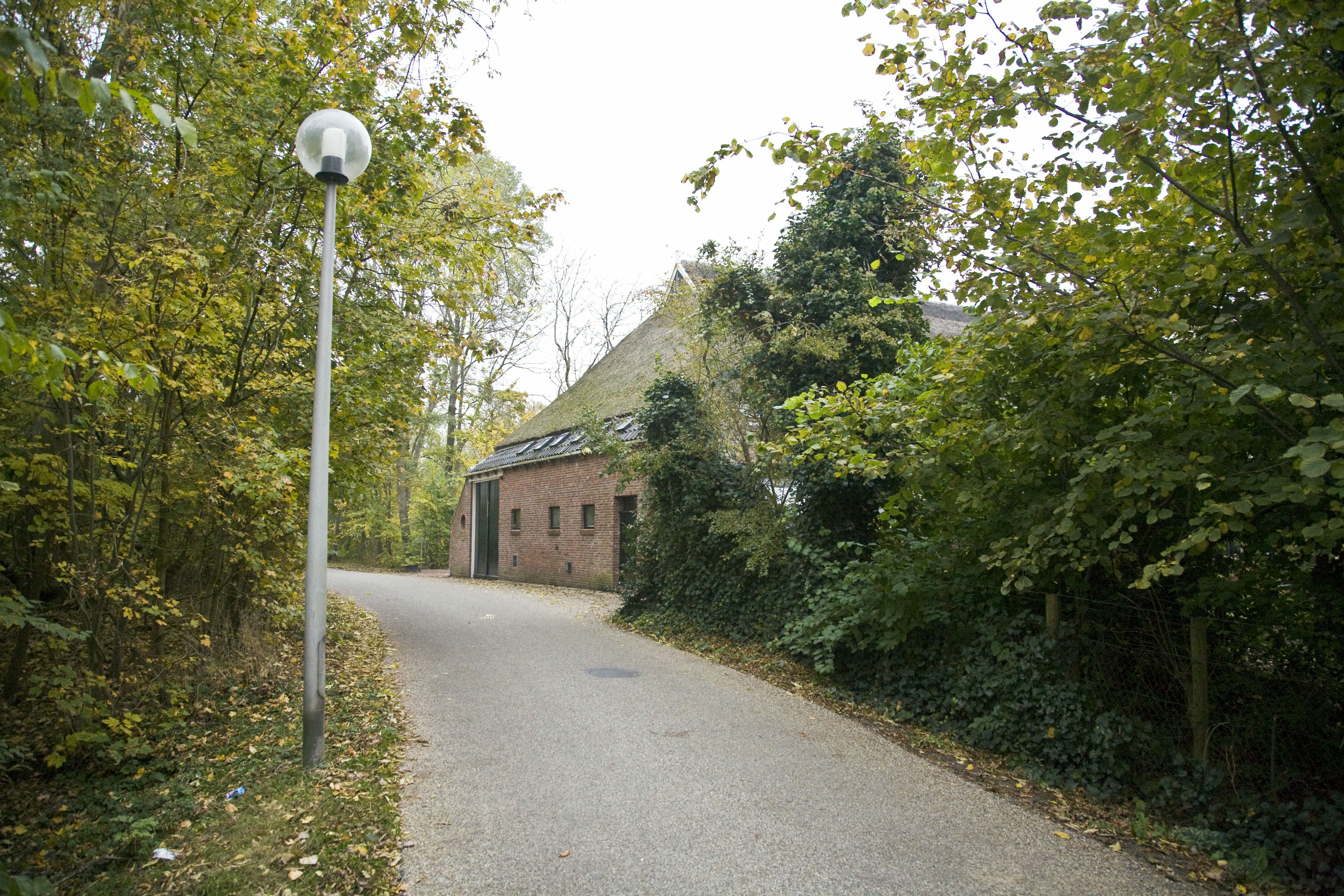
- Farm on the ring road around the terp

- Location in the province of Groningen in the Netherlands Biessum (Netherlands)
- Coordinates: 53.33386°N 6.89525°E
- Country: Netherlands
- Province: Groningen
- Municipality: Eemsdelta
- Time zone: UTC+1 (CET)
  - Summer (DST): UTC+2 (CEST)
- Postal code: 9931
- Dialing code: 0596

Biessum (Dutch pronunciation: [ˈbisʏm]) is a hamlet in the Dutch province of Groningen. It is a part of the municipality of Eemsdelta, and lies about 25 km northeast of Groningen.

It has about 35-50 inhabitants and has no village status. The postal authorities have placed it under Delfzijl. It is situated near the nature reserve (protected area) Biessumerbos in which many birds live.

The hamlet was first mentioned in the 10th or 11th century as "in Bisashem", and means "settlement of Bisi". Biessum is a terp (artificial living hill) village with a star shape. It is one of the best preserved terps of Groningen.

== Gallery ==
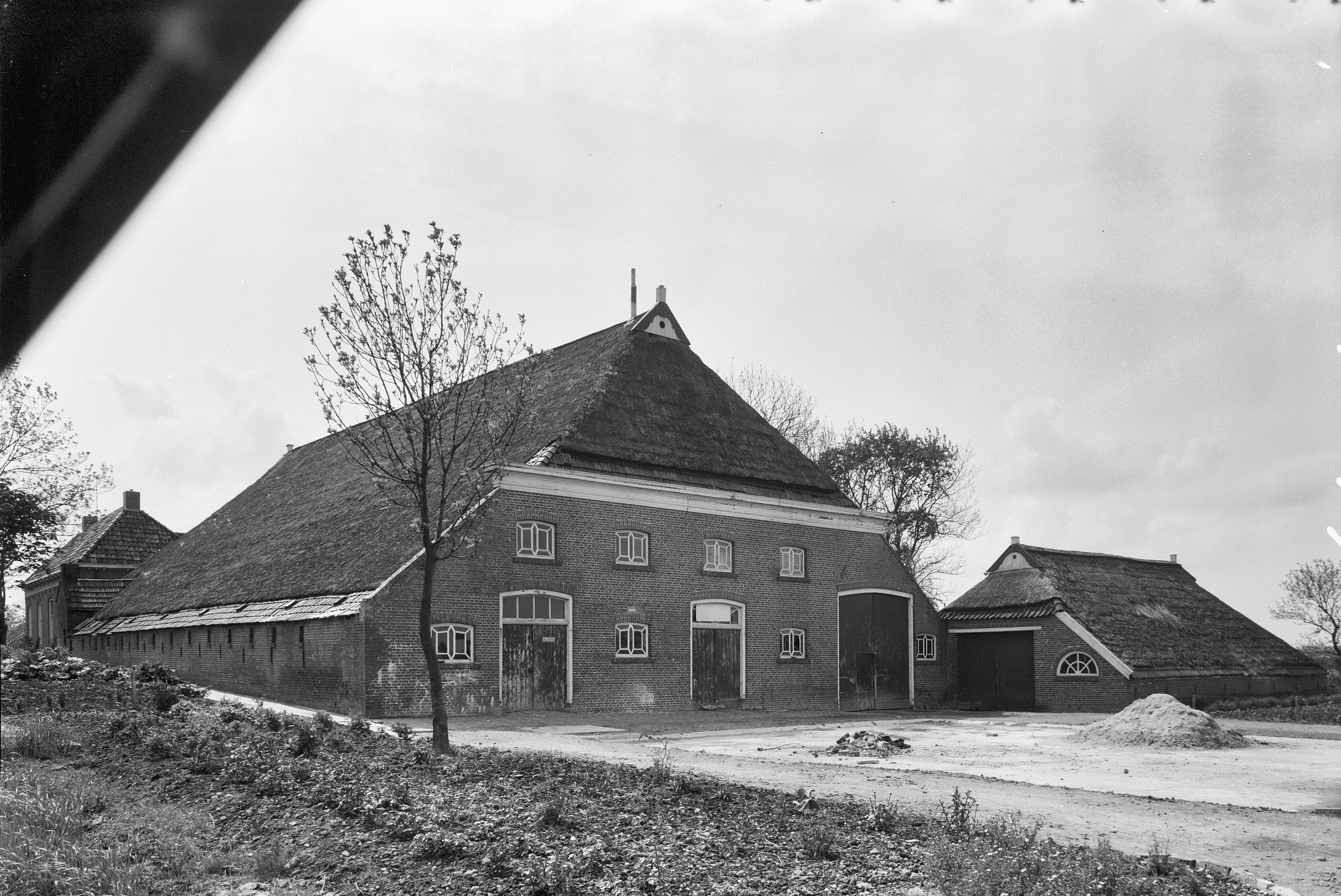
Farm in 1965

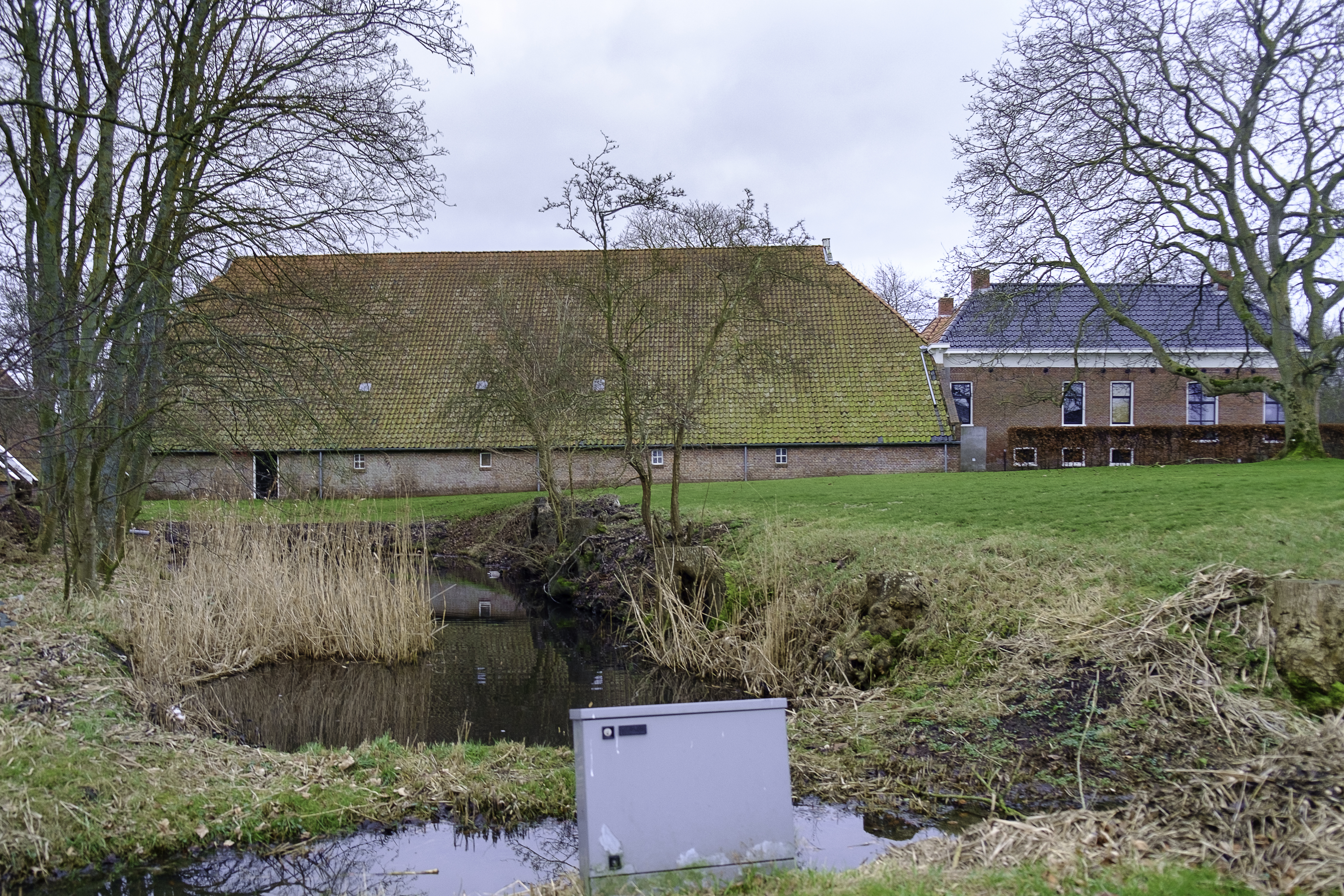
Farm in Biessum
