= Willem de Mérode =

Dutch poet (1887–1939)

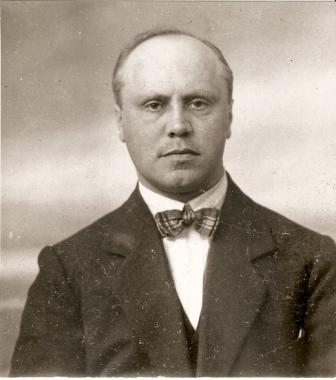
Willem de Mérode (1922)

Willem de Mérode (September 2, 1887 in Spijk – May 22, 1939 in Eerbeek) was the pseudonym of the Dutch poet, Willem Eduard Keuning.

== Biography ==
Willem Eduard Keuning was born in the Netherlands on 2 September 1887, at Spijk (Groningen). He started writing at the age of fifteen.

Between 1907 and 1924 he was a teacher at the primary school in Uithuizermeeden. He was a subtle man, deeply religious. He explored many genres of writing, using a different pseudonym for every style. He wrote over 2,300 poems, but didn't publish all of them. His homosexuality made him controversial, especially in his religious environment.

In 1924 he was accused of sexual misconduct with a boy of 16 whom he knew from the school where he taught. In those days heterosexual contact between adults and minors as from 16 years was allowed, however homosexual contact in that context was not (Hans Hafkamp). The authorities of provence Groningen convicted him and he served 8 months in jail in 1924 as a result. In addition he was not allowed to practise his job as a teacher for 3 years. The boy concerned had not accused De Mérode. He and his parents stayed friends with De Mérode their whole life. The prison time hurt him deeply and afterwards he withdrew to Eerbeek and lived his life almost as a recluse. Nevertheless, he wrote his best work during and after his sentence.

Willem de Mérode loved to travel and see art. He visited several cities, amongst them Paris, Rome, Venice and München. However, travelling was very demanding for him as he was always wrestling with his health.

In 1939, after a poetic mood during which he wrote over 70 poems, he became ill and on 22 May he died. Willem de Merode/Willem Eduard Keuning is buried in Eerbeek, a small village in the middle of the Netherlands, where he spent most of his years after his devastating prison time.

== Sources ==
- Hans Werkman: Bitterzoete overvloed. De wereld van Willem de Mérode, Aspekt, Soesterberg 2011, ISBN 978-94-6153-039-4
- Hans Werkman: De Mérode en de jongens, De Prom, Baarn 1991, ISBN 90-6801-287-8
- Helma de Boer: www.willemdemerode.nl, digital information center about Willem de Mérode

== Literature in English ==
Hans Hafkamp, 'The life of a Christian boy-lover. The poet Willem de Mérode (1887–1939)', in: Paidika volume 1 number 1 (summer 1987), p. 46-
