= Allard Oosterhuis =

Allard Lambertus Oosterhuis (19 July 1902, in Delfzijl – 1 January 1967, in Killiney) was a Dutch resistance hero during World War II.

In 1922, Oosterhuis went to Amsterdam to study medicine and after his study he became a doctor in Delfzijl. Thanks to his work as a cruiser, with his ships Cascade and Libelle, he was able to put up a smuggling route for the resistance between the harbour of Delfzijl and Stockholm. An important colleague of his in the Dutch resistance was the coaster-captain Harry Roossien who made many trips during the war. Due to these activities many people and materials left occupied Netherlands, and radio transmitters, photos from the Dutch Queen and money for the resistance were shipped into the country.

Oosterhuis was the leader of the resistance group 't Zwaantje (The Swan) from Delfzijl. The name comes from a pub named De witte Zwaan (The White Swan]) which Oosterhuis regular visited. He used the name Zwaantje as a codename in the illegal documentation he sent to the resistance and the allies.

On 12 July 1943 the German Sicherheitsdienst rolled up the resistance group after they were betrayed. Despite a collective death sentence on 23 June 1944, most of the members survived the war in captivity in German warcamps. They were liberated in autumn 1945.

After the war, Oosterhuis, for health reasons, quit his profession as a doctor and became a cruiser with his ship MS Stientje Mensinga, a rebuilt landing vehicle from 1943. The ship sunk during a heavy storm on the Irish coast by Erritshead in 1961.

In 1952, he settled permanently in Ireland and received the Bronze Cross for bravery against the occupier during World War II. He died age 64 in Ireland and was buried in Delfzijl.

In 1970, a resistance monument named 't Zwaantje' was revealed in Delfzijl.

== Literature ==
- De verzetsgroep Zwaantje; oorlogsbelevenissen van dr. Allard Oosterhuis. Verteld door J.Klatter, uitgeverij N.V. Het Parool, Amsterdam 1968.
