= Krewerd =

- Village
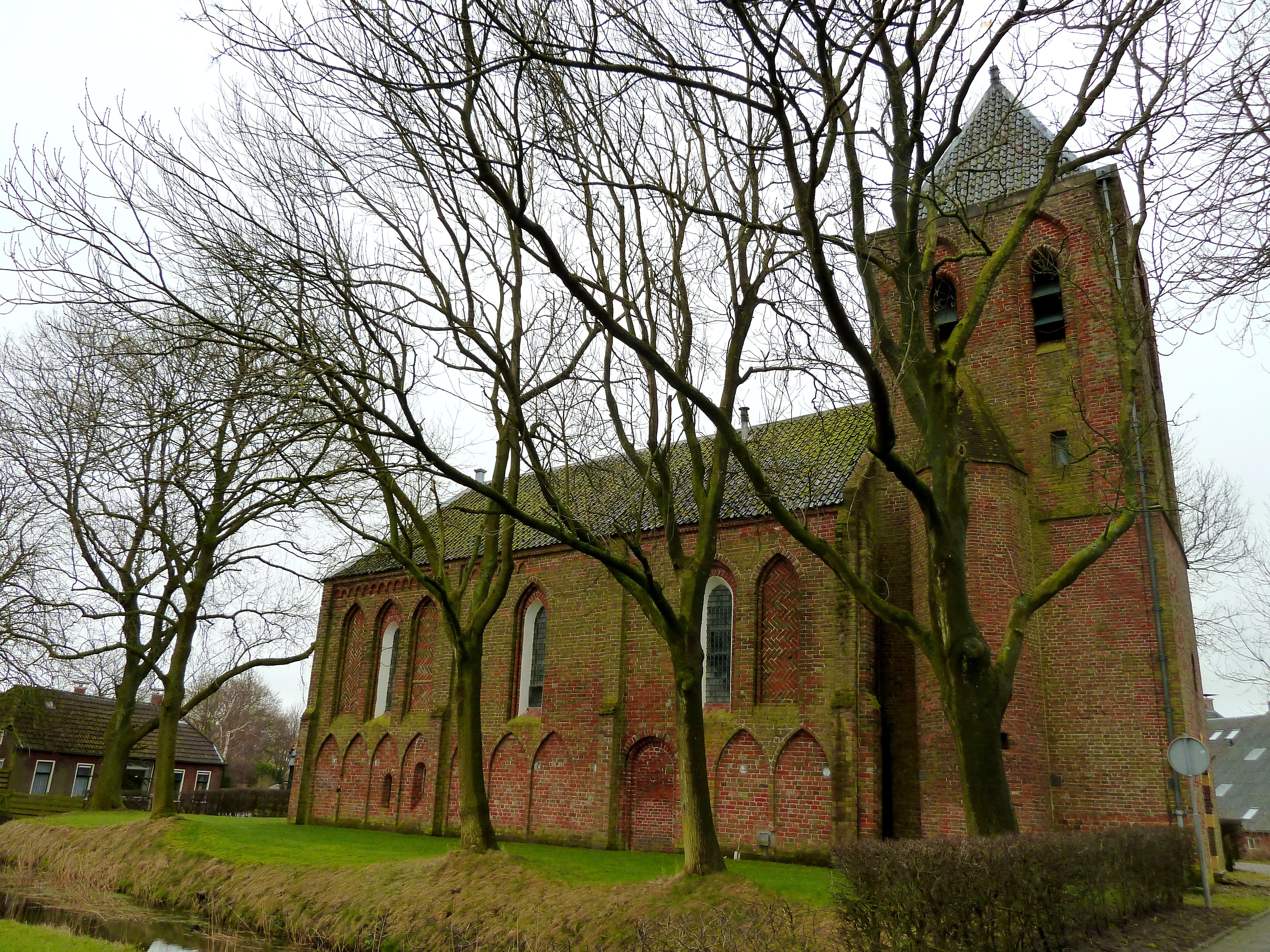
- Maria Church in Krewerd

- Location in the province of Groningen in the Netherlands Krewerd (Netherlands)
- Coordinates: 53°21′14″N 6°50′56″E
- Country: Netherlands
- Province: Groningen
- Municipality: Eemsdelta

Area
  - Total: 0.07 km^{2} (0.027 sq mi)
- Elevation: 0.3 m (0.98 ft)

Population (2021)
  - Total: 75
  - Density: 1,100/km^{2} (2,800/sq mi)
- Time zone: UTC+1 (CET)
  - Summer (DST): UTC+2 (CEST)
- Postal code: 9904
- Dialing code: 0596

Krewerd (Dutch pronunciation: [ˈkreːʋərt]; Gronings: Kraiwerd [ˈkrɑiʋət]) is a village with a population of around 75 in the municipality of Eemsdelta in the province of Groningen in the Netherlands. The medieval village church houses a gothic organ from 1531, which is still largely in its original state.

== History ==
The village was first mentioned in 1280 as Crewerth, and means "crow (Corvus corone) terp". Krewerd is a terp (artificial living hill) village with radial structure which dates from between 800 and 1100. In the late middle ages, a canal was dug to the Damsterdiep.

The monastery Nijenklooster used to be located near Krewerd. It was a Premonstratensian monastery which was an outpost of Bloemhof, and the official name was "Campus Rosarum". It was demolished in 1574. The Dutch Reformed church was built around 1280, and the tower was added 1400. A western entrance was built in the tower in 1782.

Krewerd was home to 85 people in 1840.

== Geography ==
Krewerd is located in the municipality of the Delfzijl in the north of the province of the Groningen in the northeast of the Netherlands.

Krewerd lies directly northwest of Delfzijl and about 24 km northeast of the city of Groningen.

== Gallery ==
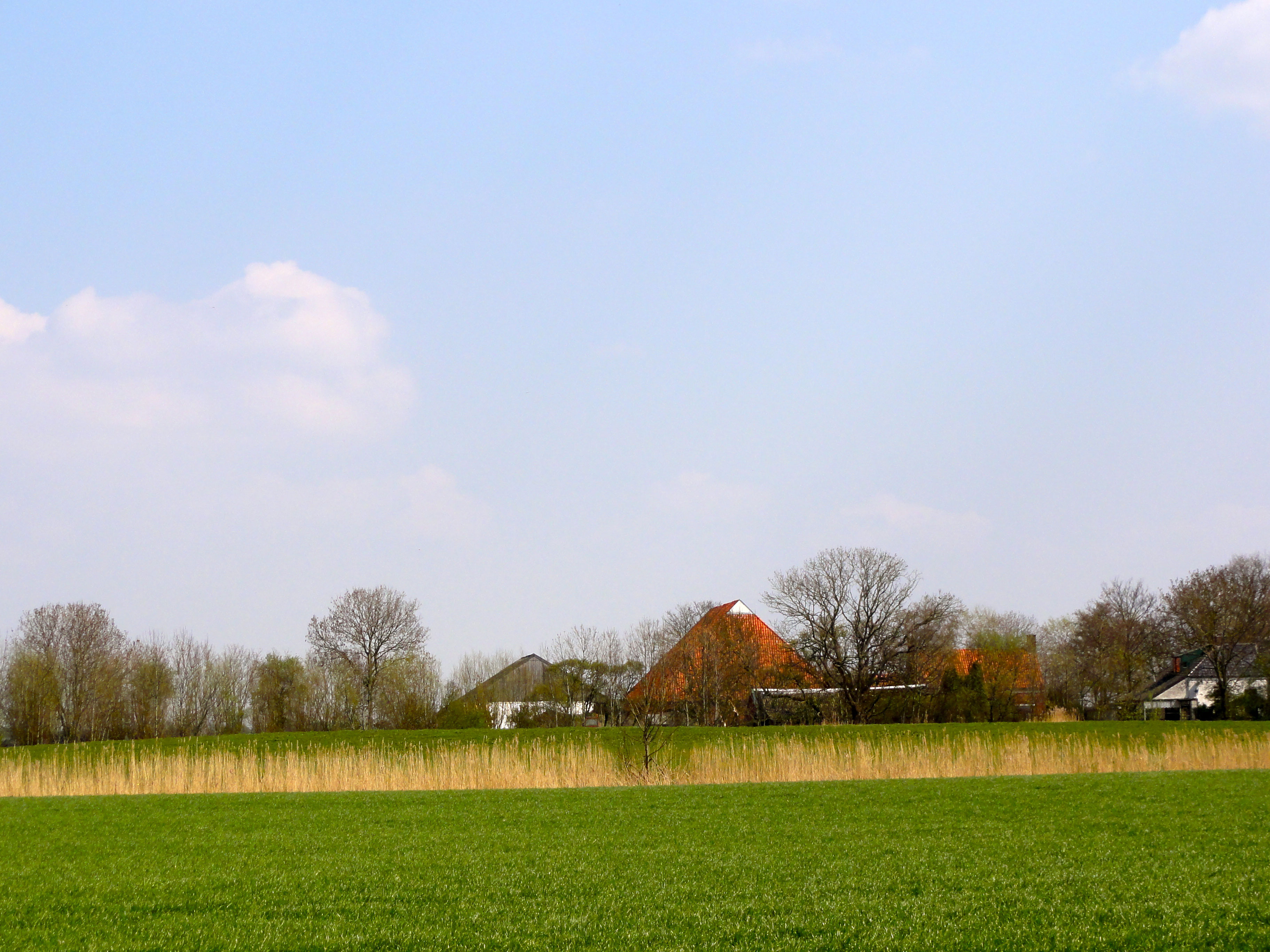
Former location of the monastery Nijenklooster

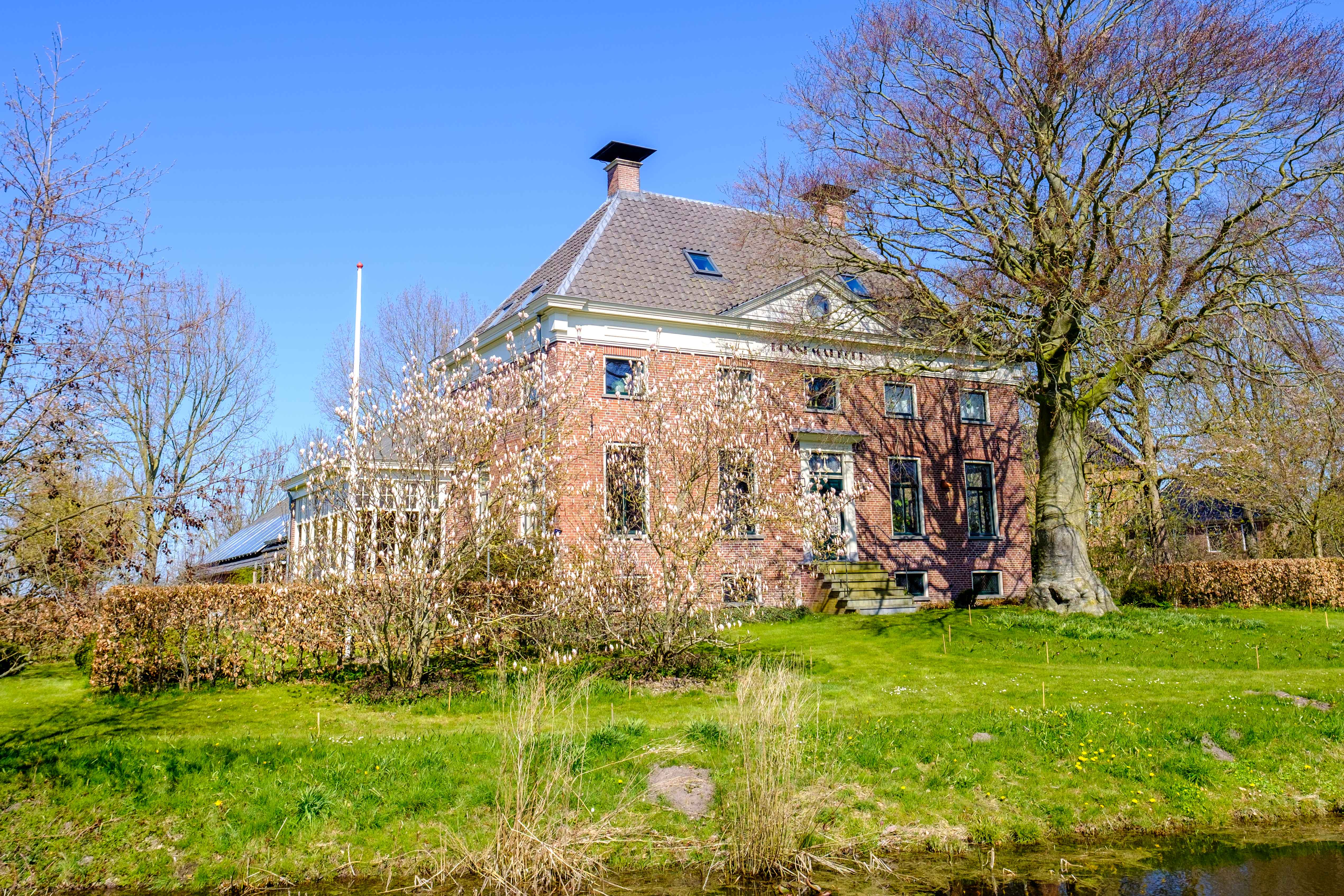
Bonnemaheerd

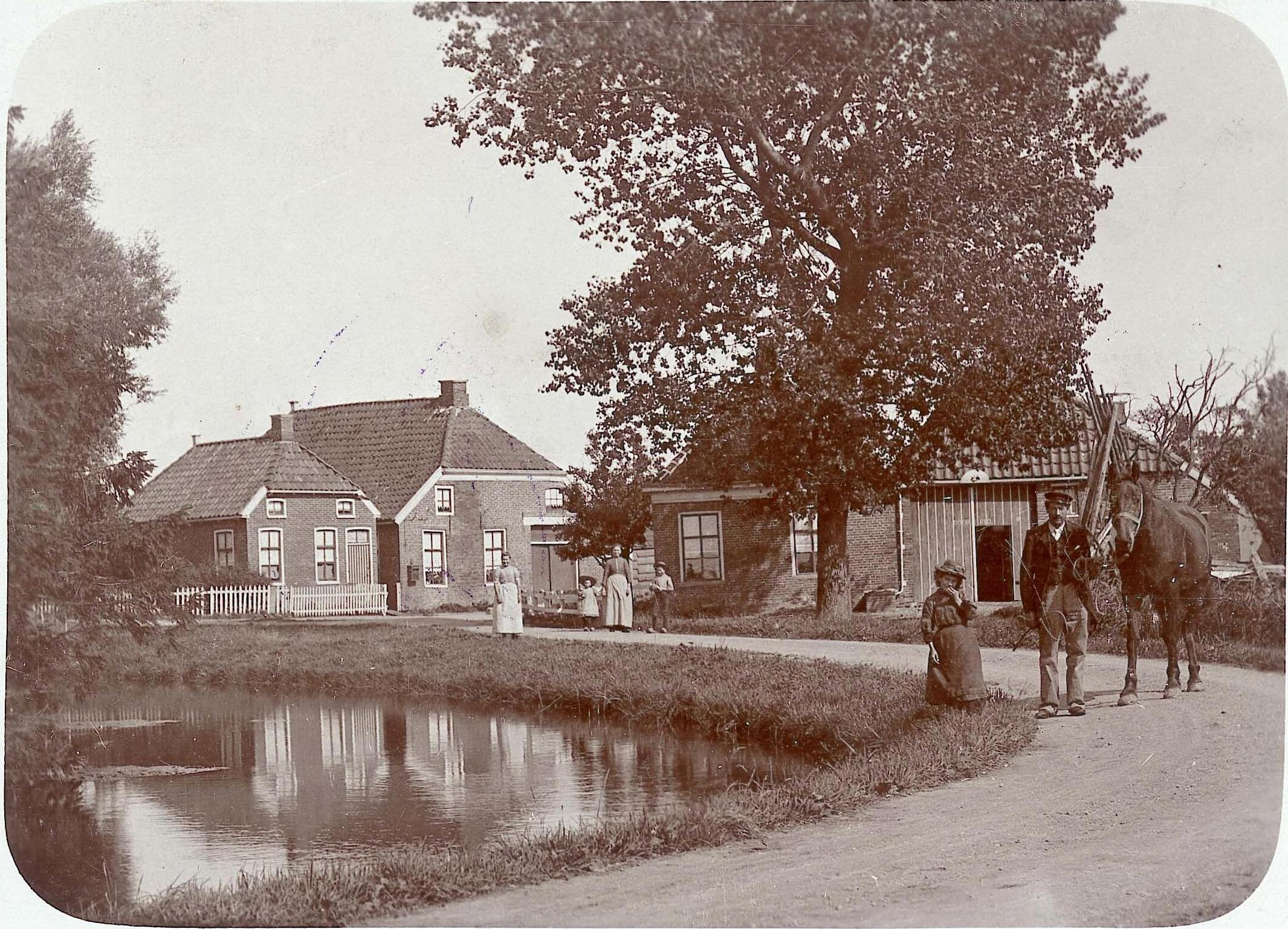
Former pub Maathuis (1900-1905)
