= Weiwerd =

- Former village
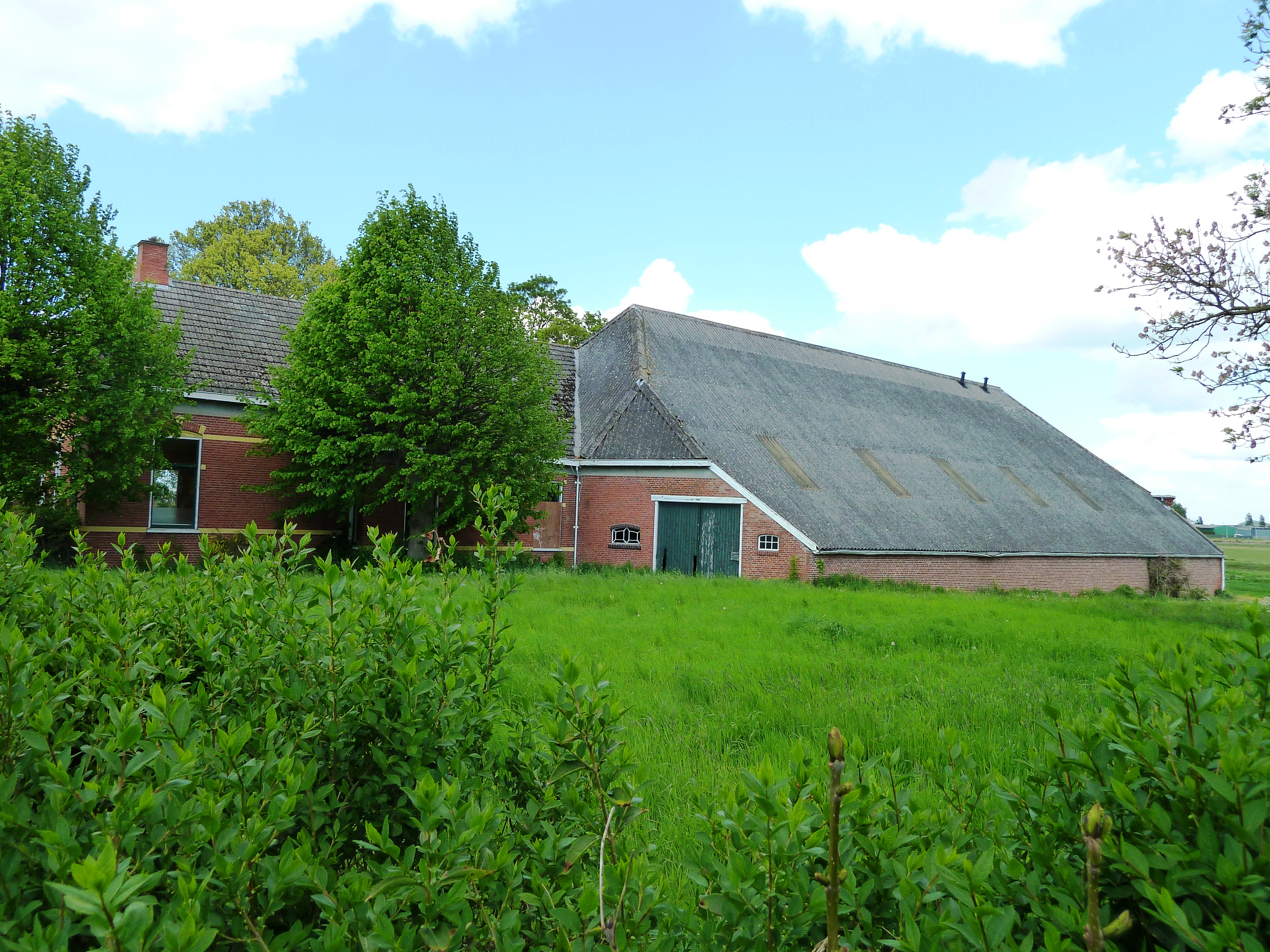
- Farm in 2011

- Location in the province of Groningen in the Netherlands Weiwerd (Netherlands)
- Coordinates: 53°19′N 6°57′E
- Country: Netherlands
- Province: Groningen
- Municipality: Eemsdelta

Area
  - Total: 0.12 km^{2} (0.046 sq mi)
- Elevation: 0.5 m (1.6 ft)

Population (2021)
  - Total: 0
  - Density: 0.0/km^{2} (0.0/sq mi)
- Time zone: UTC+1 (CET)
  - Summer (DST): UTC+2 (CEST)
- Postal code: 9936
- Dialing code: 0596

Weiwerd (Dutch pronunciation: [ˈʋɛiʋərt]; Gronings: Waaiwerd [ˈʋɑːɪ̯ʋət]) is a former village in the Dutch province of Groningen. It is a part of the municipality of Eemsdelta, and lies about 27 km east of Groningen.

Formerly a farming community with its own church, school, and shops, the whole village was scheduled for demolition in the 1970s to allow the industrial area of Delfzijl harbour to be expand. Less than 10% of the original buildings are left. The school and the cemetery have remained. The terp (artificial living hill) was supposed to be excavated as well, however protests have prevented its destruction, and the terp is now a protected monument.

== History ==
The village was first mentioned in the 10th or 11th century as UUahcuurð. The etymology is unclear. Weiwerd is a terp village from the start of our era. It has a radial structure and located near the Dollart.

In 1840, Weiwerd was home to 311 people. Prior to the demolition order, it was home to over 300 peoples. In 2015, the last two inhabitants left the village. Even though the village has no inhabitants, it still has place name signs.

== Gallery ==
Aerial view of the village and images of its destruction

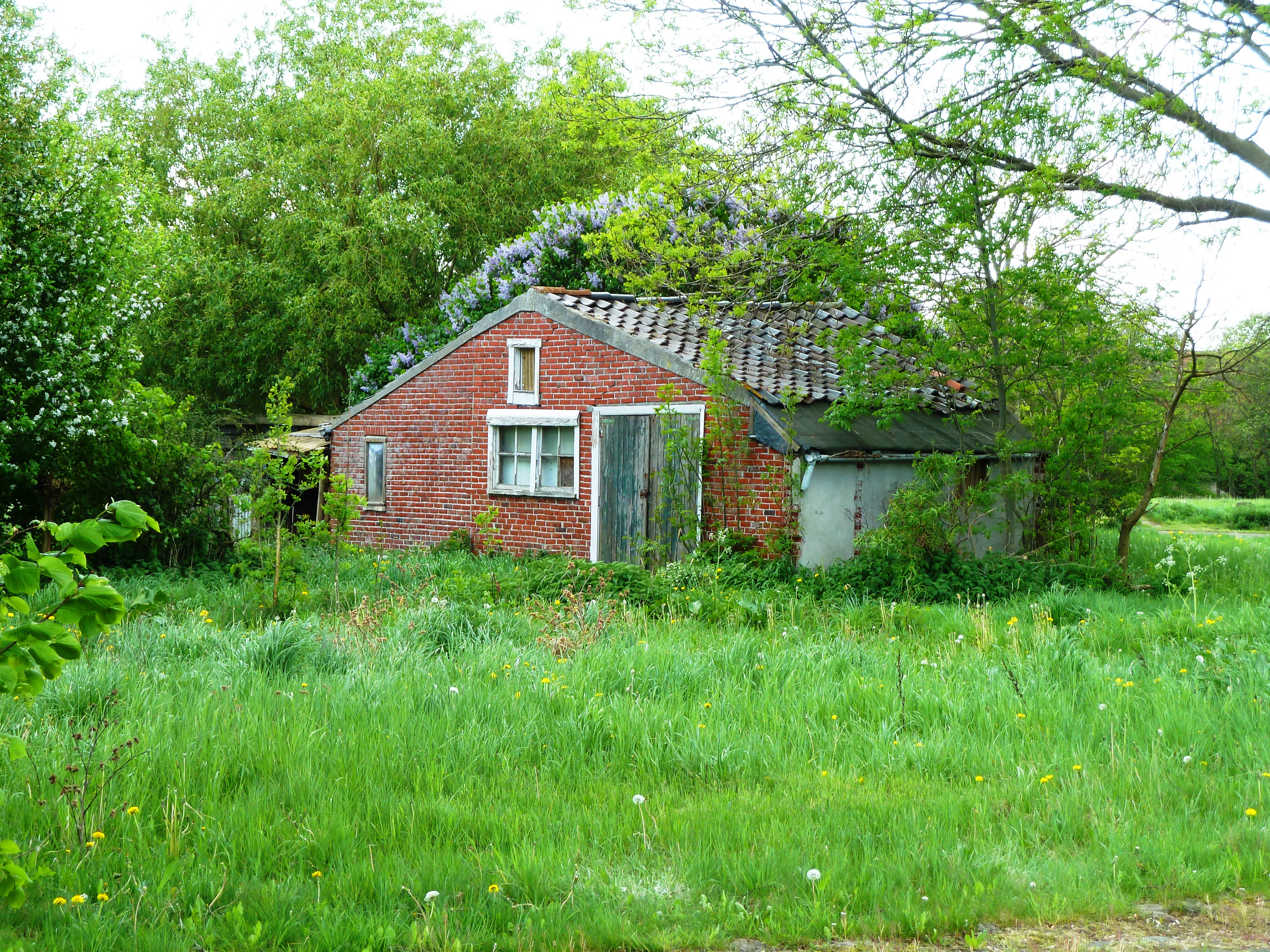
Derelict building

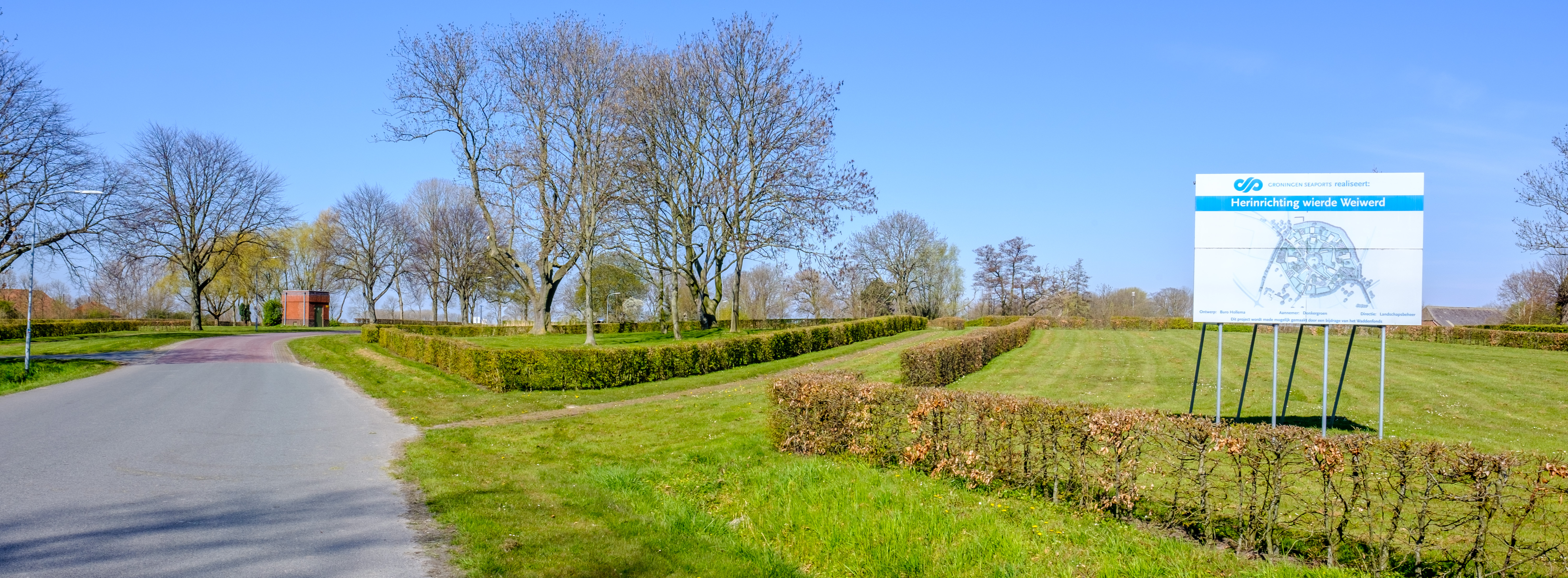
The empty fields of Weiwerd

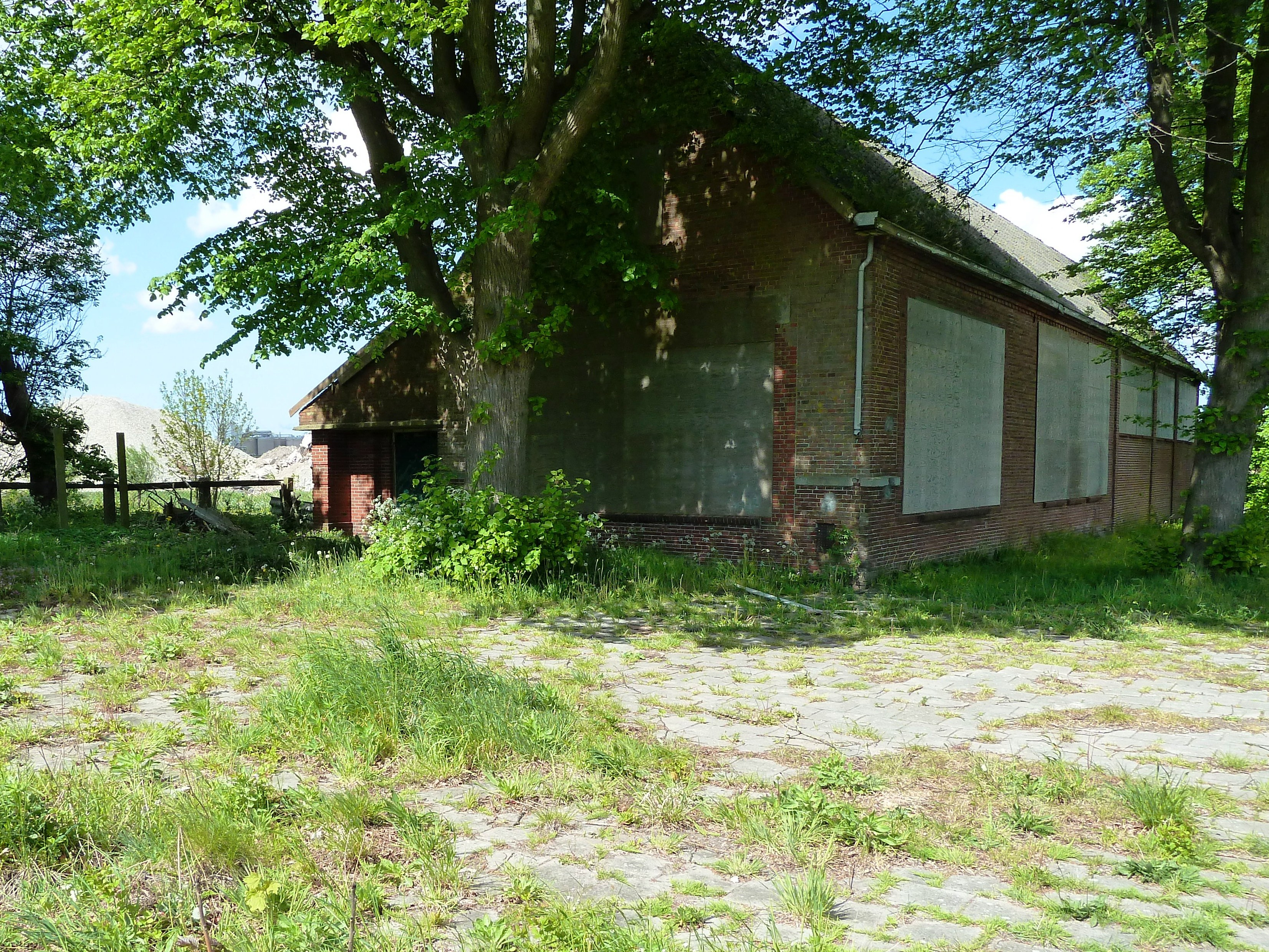
Former school
