= Borgsweer =

- Village
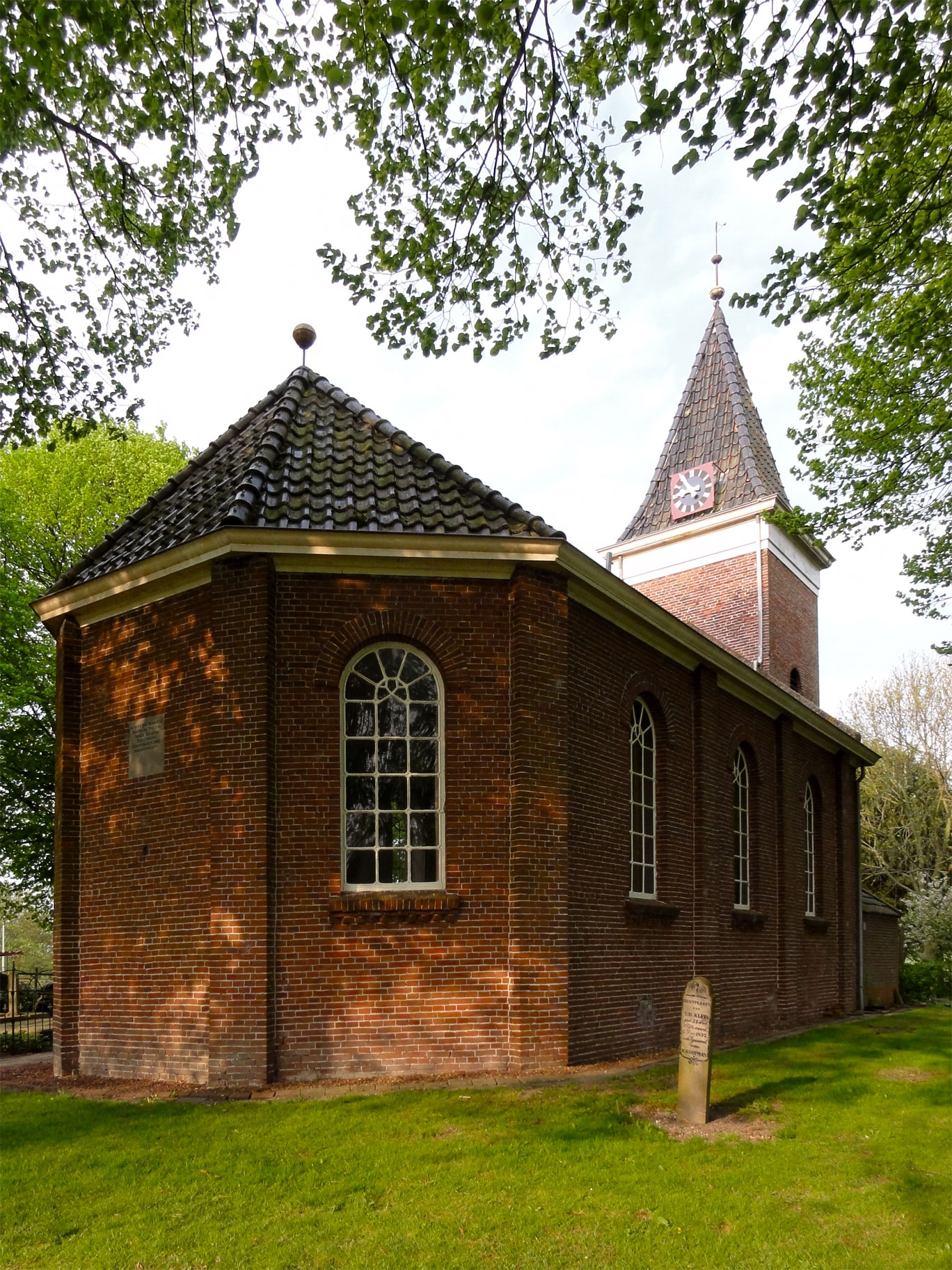
- Borgsweer church

- Location in the province of Groningen in the Netherlands Borgsweer (Netherlands)
- Coordinates: 53°18′N 7°1′E
- Country: Netherlands
- Province: Groningen
- Municipality: Eemsdelta

Population (1 January 2017)
  - Total: 130
- Time zone: UTC+1 (CET)
  - Summer (DST): UTC+2 (CEST)
- Postal code: 9949
- Dialing code: 0596

Borgsweer (Dutch pronunciation: [bɔr(ə)xsˈʋeːr]; Gronings: Börgsweer [bœːχsˈʋɪːr]) is a town in the Dutch province of Groningen. It is a part of the municipality of Eemsdelta, and is located about 31 km east of the city of Groningen.

The statistical area "Borgsweer", which also can include the surrounding countryside, has a population of around 130.
