= Spijk, Groningen =

Spijk
- Village
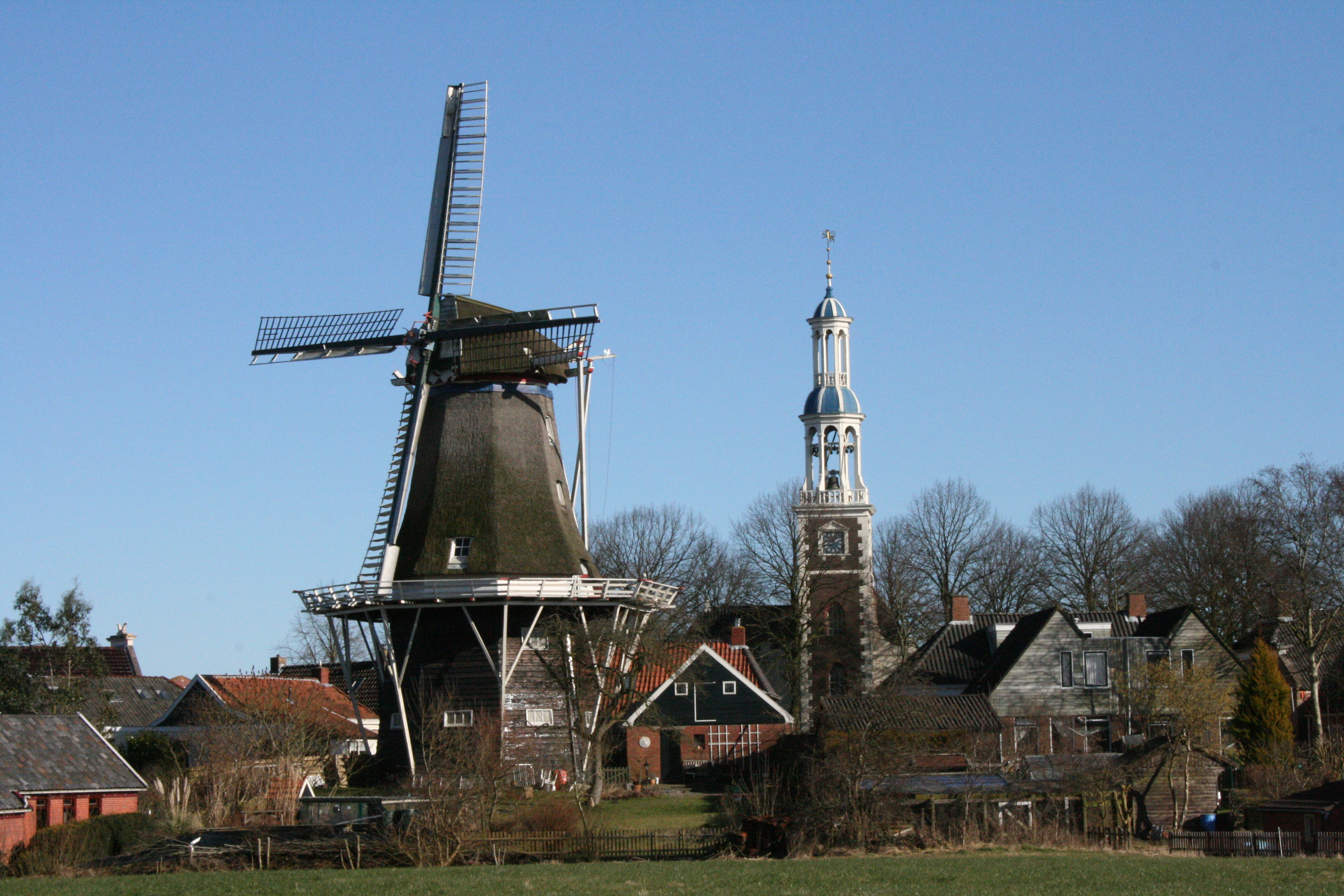
- Spijk in 2009

- Location in the province of Groningen in the Netherlands Spijk (Netherlands)
- Coordinates: 53°23′23″N 6°50′11″E
- Country: Netherlands
- Province: Groningen
- Municipality: Eemsdelta

Area
  - Total: 0.67 km^{2} (0.26 sq mi)
- Elevation: 3.2 m (10 ft)

Population (2021)
  - Total: 1,155
  - Density: 1,700/km^{2} (4,500/sq mi)
- Time zone: UTC+1 (CET)
  - Summer (DST): UTC+2 (CEST)
- Postal code: 9909
- Dialing code: 0596

Spijk (Dutch pronunciation: [spɛik]; Gronings: Spiek [spik]) is a village in the Dutch province of Groningen. It is a part of the municipality of Eemsdelta, and lies about 26 kilometres (16 mi) northeast of Groningen. Spijk is a radial terp village from 600-700 BC where the original structure is still clearly visible.

== History ==
The village was first mentioned in 1246 as Spik, and means headland. Spijk is a terp village with a radial structure which probably dates from the 7th or 6th century BC. It has a double ring road and a circular canal, and the church has been placed in the middle. The original structure is still clearly visible. In the 11th century, a dike was built along the former Fivel River.

The Dutch Reformed church was from the 13th century, however it burned down and only the old walls have remained. In 1848, it was extended on the north side. The tower dates from 1902.

In 1686 and 1717, most of the buildings excluding the church were destroyed in floods.

The grist mill Ceres dates from 1839. It is located opposite the church outside the inner ring. In 2013, it was restored, and was recommissioned in 2015.

Spijk was home to 409 people in 1840.

== Gallery ==
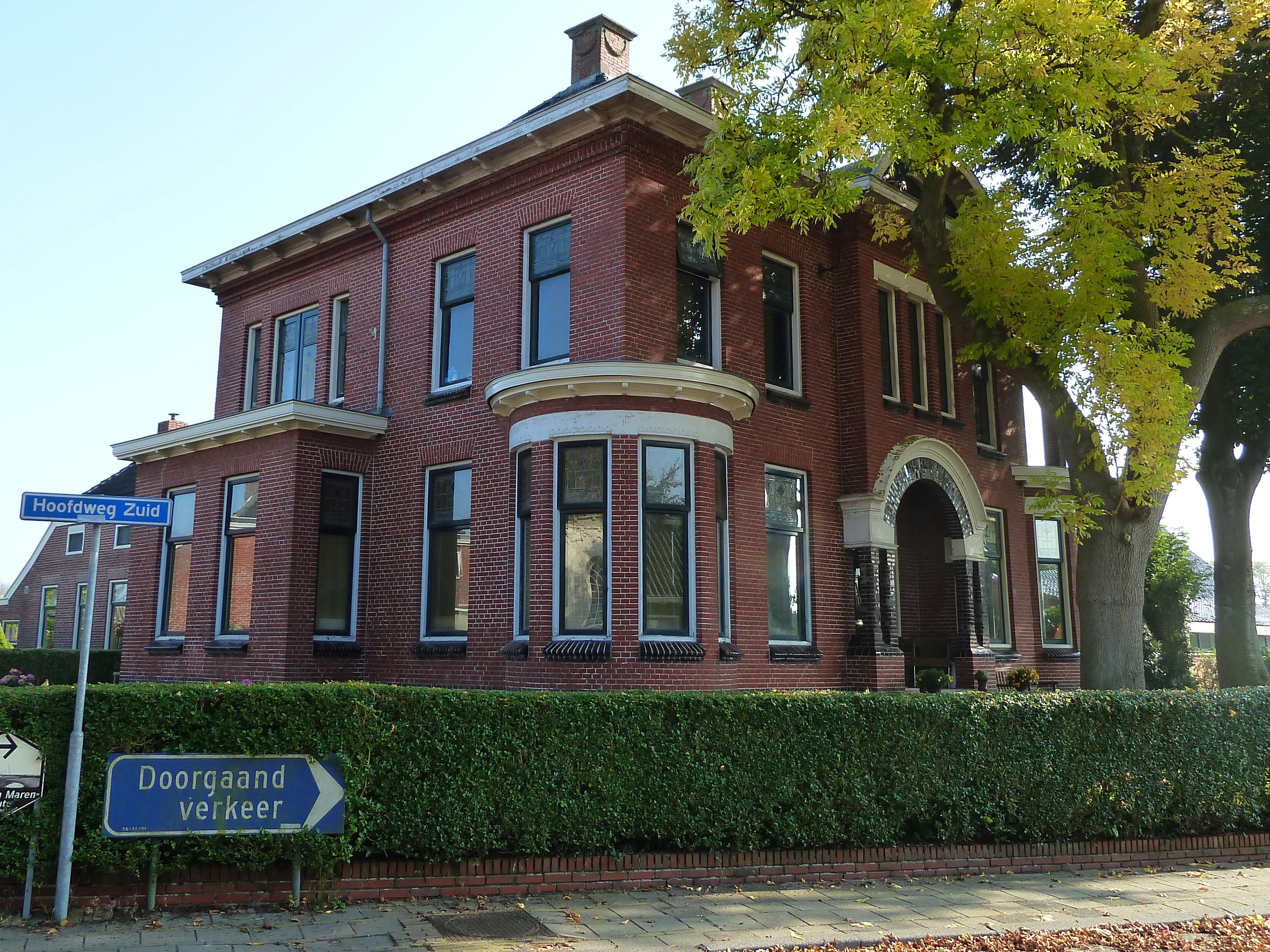
Former clergy house

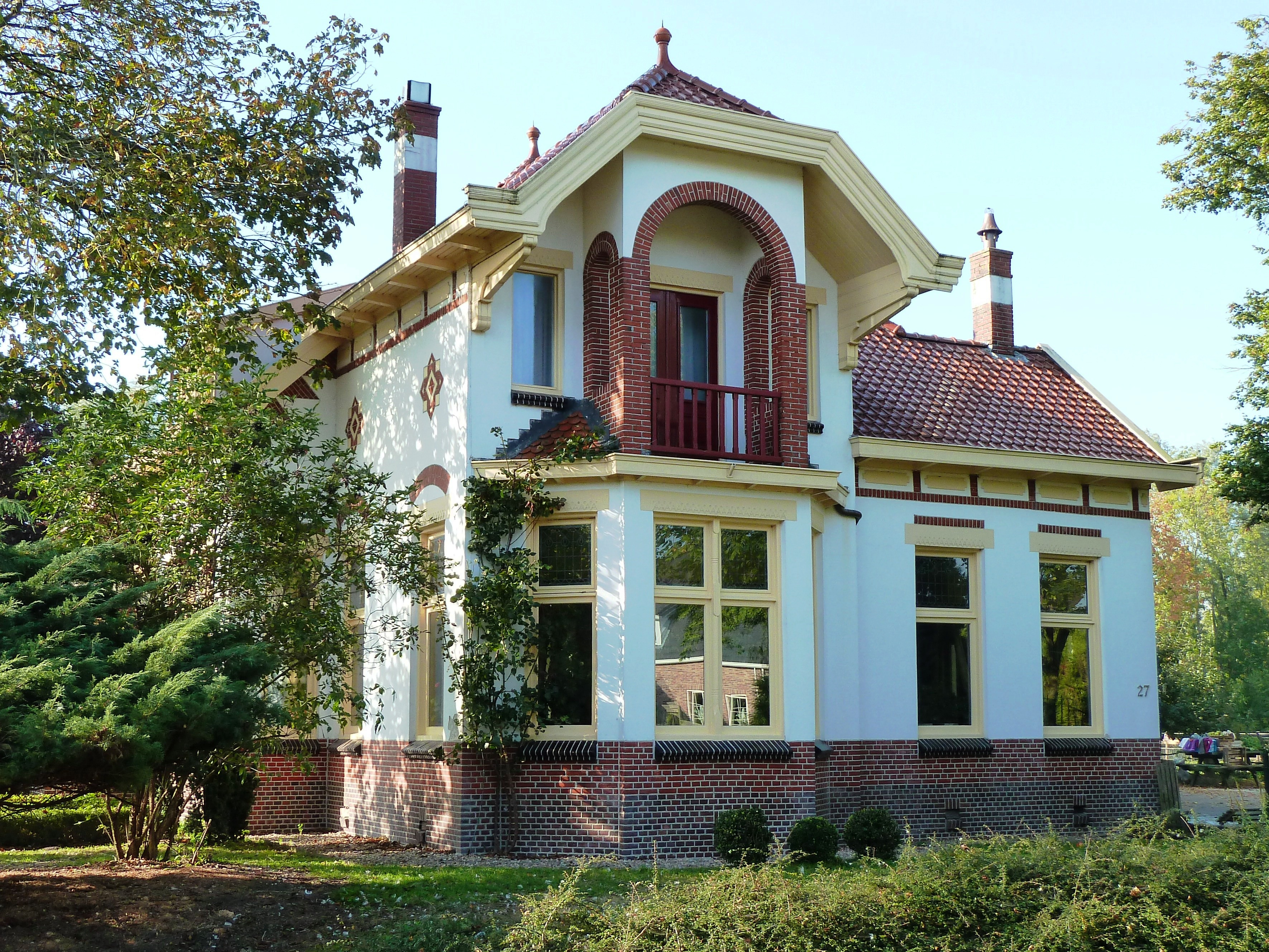
Villa in Spijk

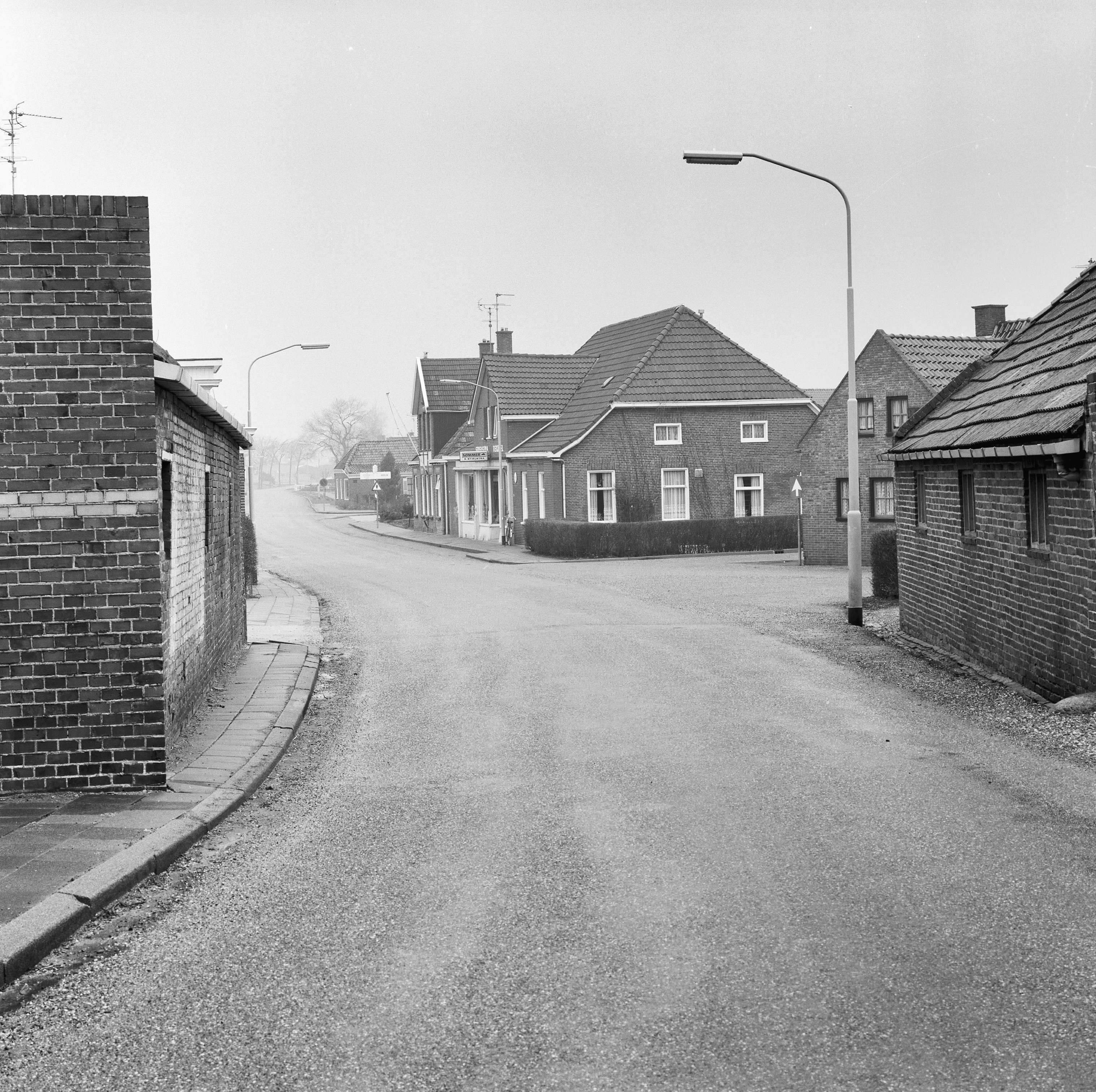
Main street (1979)

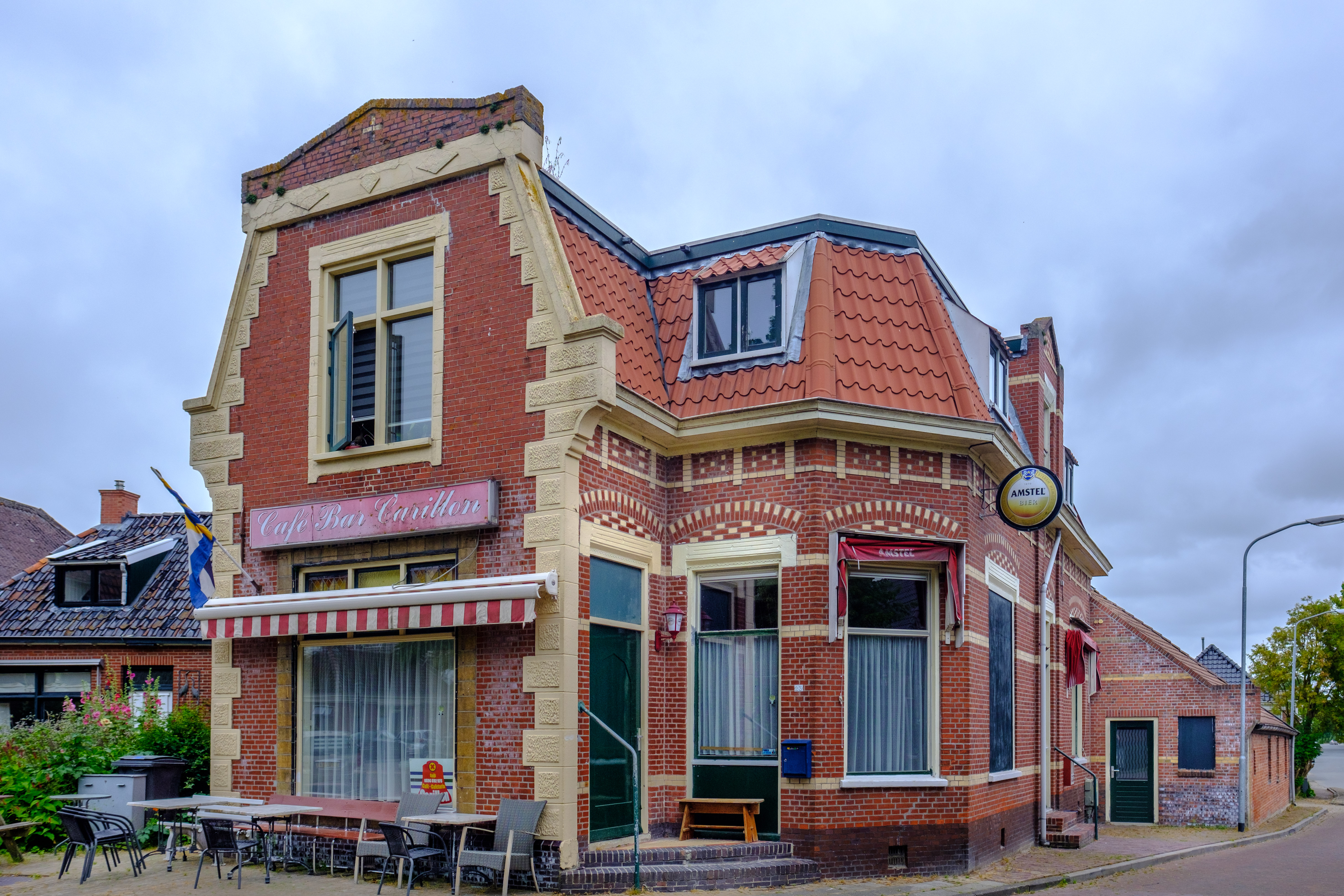
Pub in Spijk
