= Amsweer =

- Hamlet
- Location in the province of Groningen in the Netherlands Amsweer (Netherlands)
- Coordinates: 53.30852°N 6.90224°E
- Country: Netherlands
- Province: Groningen
- Municipality: Eemsdelta
- Village: Meedhuizen
- Elevation: 0.2 m (0.66 ft)

Population
  - Total: c. 25
- Time zone: UTC+1 (CET)
  - Summer (DST): UTC+2 (CEST)
- Postcode: 9937
- Area code: 0596

Amsweer (Dutch pronunciation: [ɑmsˈʋeːr]) is a hamlet on a small wierde in the municipality of Eemsdelta in the province of Groningen in the Netherlands, just south of the Eems Canal.

There used to be a drinking water pond on the wierde that never dried up. There were three brick wells in that pond, which were called the zusterputten ('sister wells') or jufferputten ('damsel wells'). These wells provided drinking water, which was particularly welcome in dry summers when the water in the surrounding ditches began to salinize. Three single ladies who lived in a house together are said to have built the wells. There was a small school building near the wells around 1820. The wells were filled in during 1911. Despite its small size, Amsweer was a busy hamlet in the 19th century. There were carpentries, carriage factories, and glass-bending factories.

The wierde is first mentioned as Omptsweer (1448) and Amptesweer (1449), perhaps in the meaning 'the mound of the office (here apparently: the Oosterambt of Fivelingo)'.

The country estate or borg of Vliethoven is located about 2 kilometers north of Amsweer, in the Tuikwerd district. Due to the presence of the Eems Canal, the country estate can only be reached from Amsweer via a long detour via Opwierde.

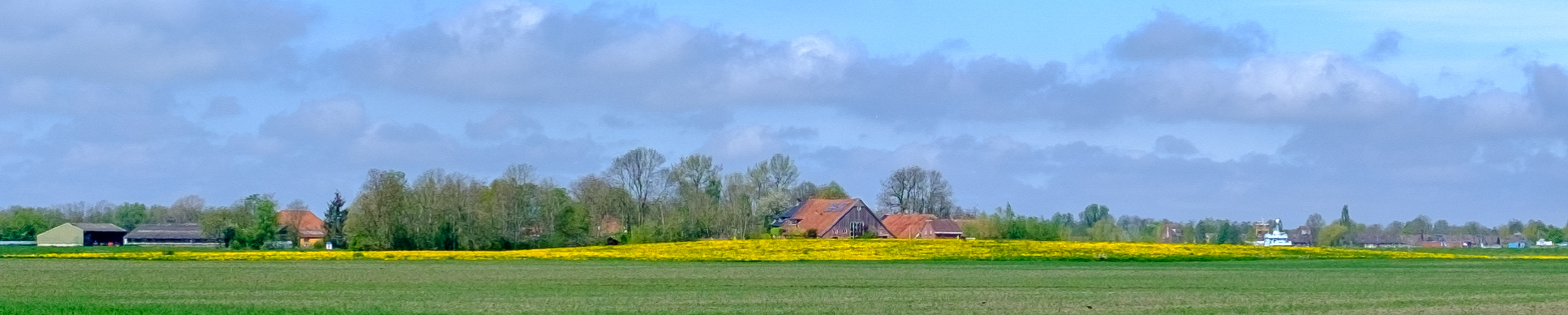
Amsweer from the southeast
