= Losdorp =

- Village
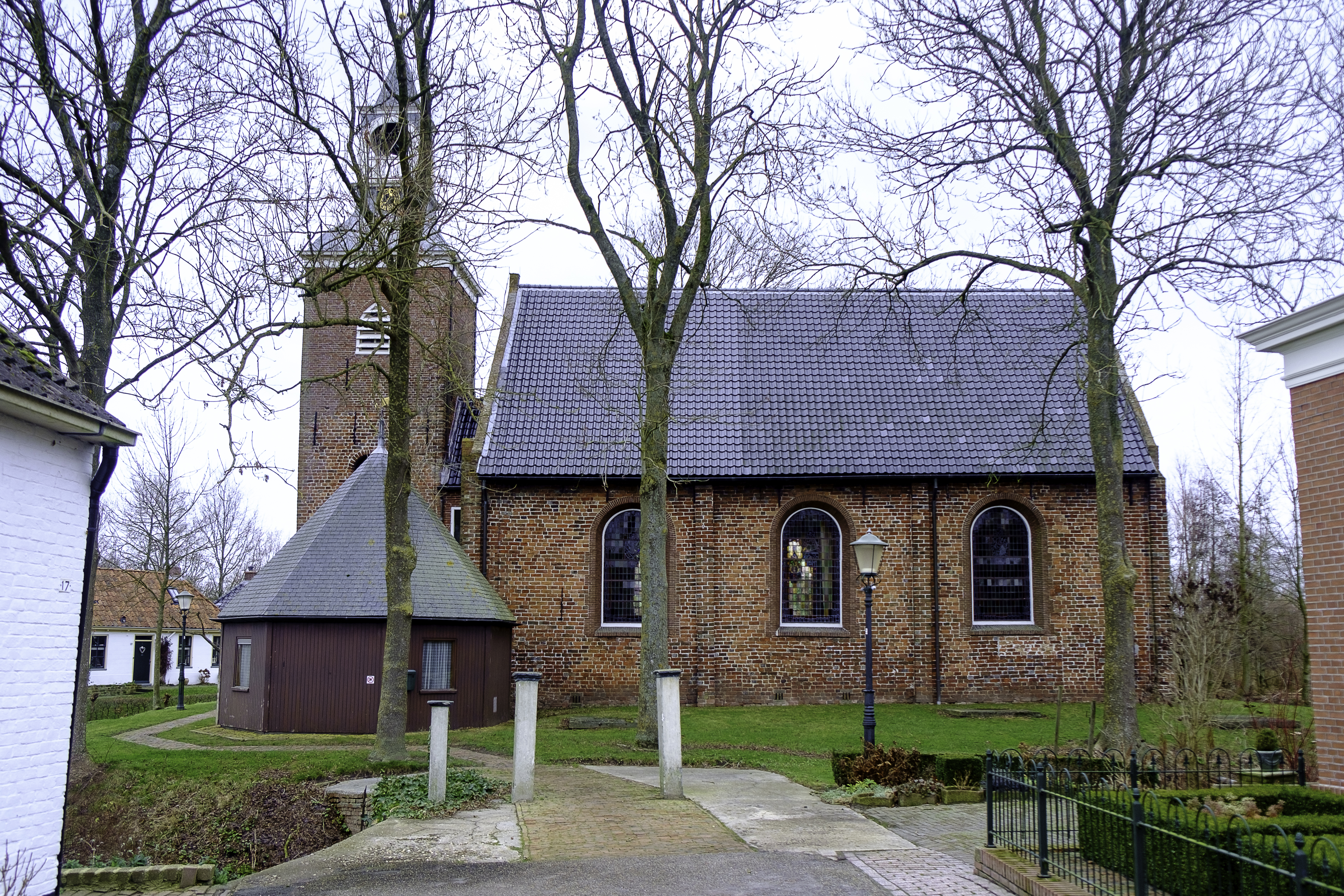
- Church in Losdorp

- Location in the province of Groningen in the Netherlands Losdorp (Netherlands)
- Coordinates: 53°23′N 6°50′E
- Country: Netherlands
- Province: Groningen
- Municipality: Eemsdelta

Area
  - Total: 0.26 km^{2} (0.10 sq mi)
- Elevation: 0.4 m (1.3 ft)

Population (2021)
  - Total: 145
  - Density: 560/km^{2} (1,400/sq mi)
- Time zone: UTC+1 (CET)
  - Summer (DST): UTC+2 (CEST)
- Postal code: 9907
- Dialing code: 0596

Losdorp (Dutch pronunciation: [ˈlɔzdɔr(ə)p]) is a village in the Dutch province of Groningen. It is a part of the municipality of Eemsdelta, and lies about 25 km northeast of Groningen.

== History ==
The village was first mentioned in 1429 as "toe Lesdorp", and could mean "little village". Losdorp is a terp (artificial living hill) with a radial structure which has been known to exist since 1053. The terp has been partially excavated.

The church probably dates from the 13th century, but has been extensively modified between 1775 and 1776. The tower dated from 1662, but has also been modified in 1775 and received its current spire in 1848.

Losdorp was home to 94 people in 1840. The terp was restored in 2013.

== Gallery ==
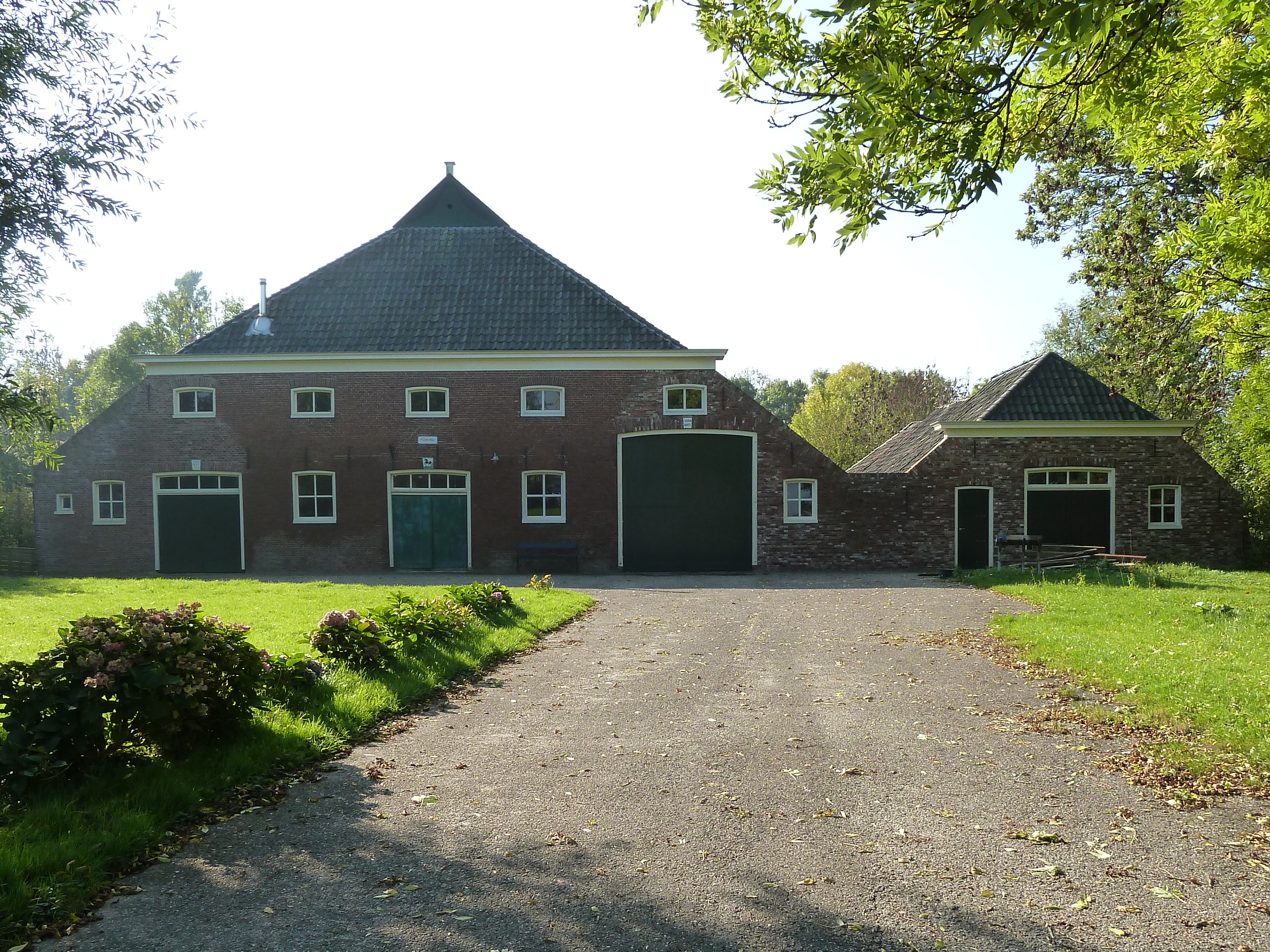
Farm in Losdorp

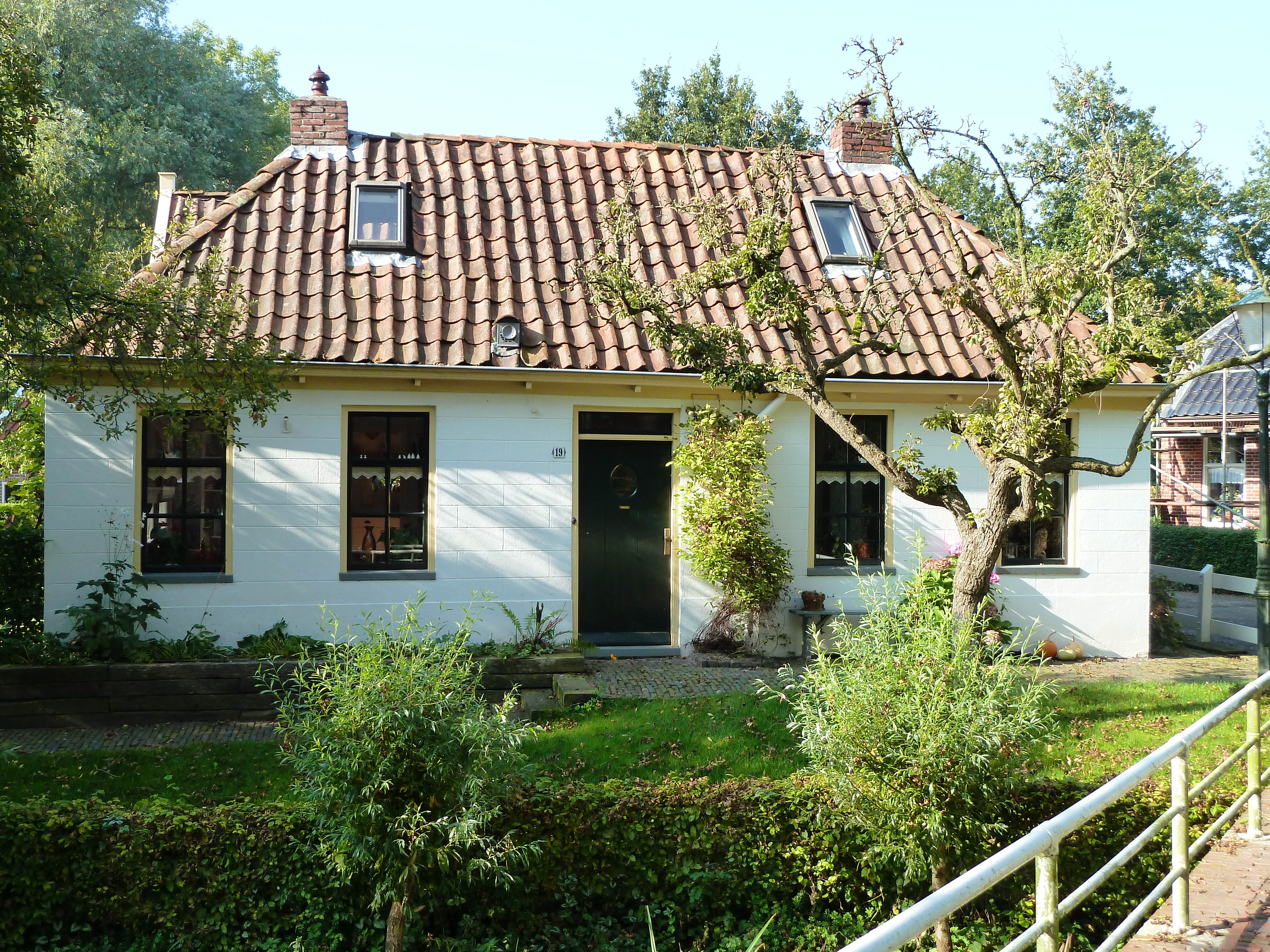
House in Losdorp

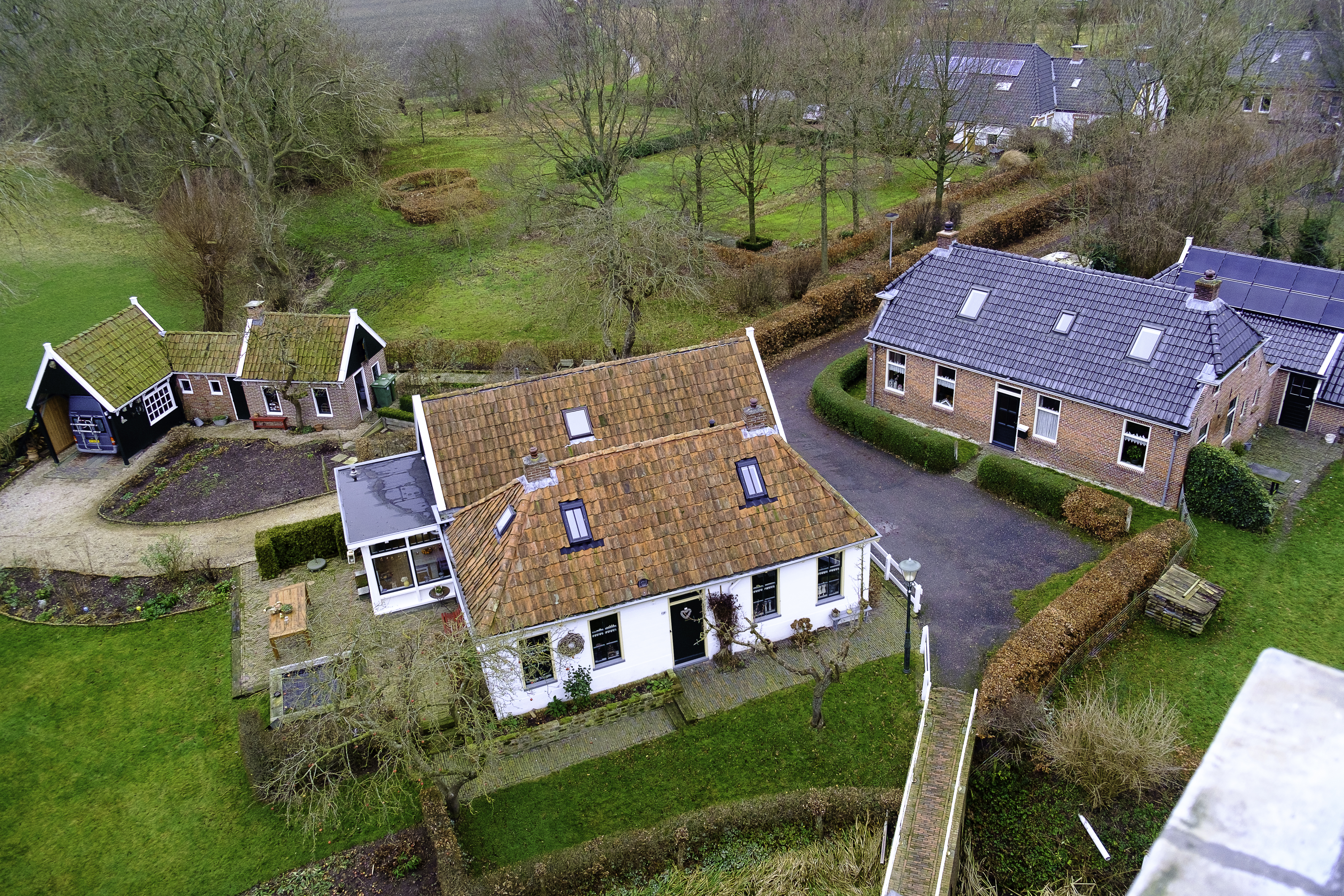
View from the church tower
