= Meedhuizen =

Meedhuizen Midhoezen (Gronings)
- Village
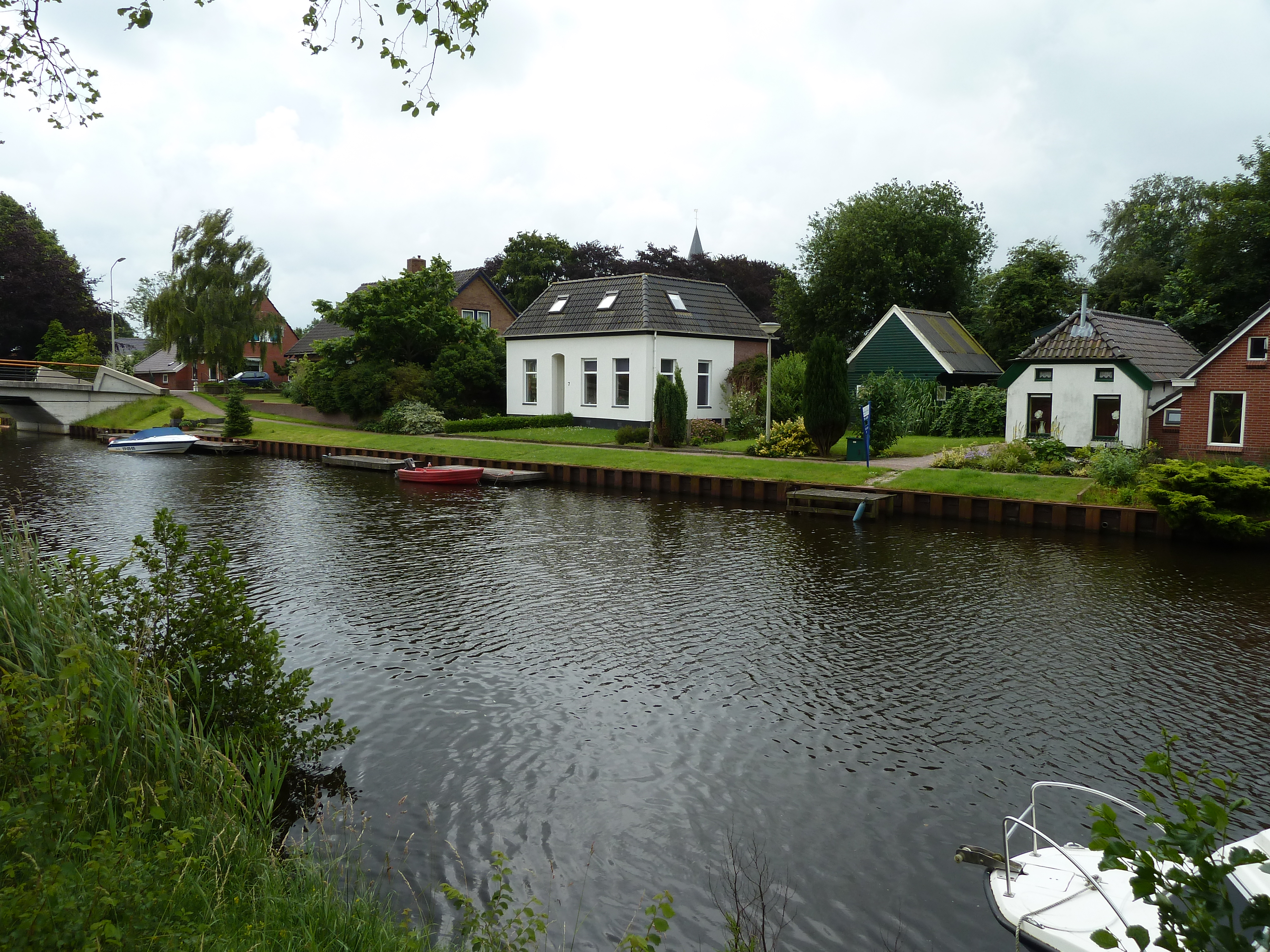
- Meedhuizen in 2011

- Location in the province of Groningen in the Netherlands Meedhuizen (Netherlands)
- Coordinates: 53°17′N 6°55′E
- Country: Netherlands
- Province: Groningen
- Municipality: Eemsdelta

Area
  - Total: 0.41 km^{2} (0.16 sq mi)
- Elevation: −0.5 m (−1.6 ft)

Population (2021)
  - Total: 390
  - Density: 950/km^{2} (2,500/sq mi)
- Time zone: UTC+1 (CET)
  - Summer (DST): UTC+2 (CEST)
- Postal code: 9937
- Dialing code: 0596

Meedhuizen (Dutch: [meːtˈɦœyzə(n)]; Gronings: Midhoezen [mɪtˈɦuːzn̩]) is a village in the Dutch province of Groningen. It is a part of the municipality of Eemsdelta, and lies about 24 km east of Groningen.

== History ==
The village was first mentioned in 1306 as Methuisen, and means "middle houses". Meedhuizen originates from the 13th century.

The Dutch Reformed church could date from the 13th century, but has extensively modified in 1703. In 1803, the tower was added and slightly enlarged in 1833.

Meedhuizen was home to 164 people in 1840. The village used to be located between three lakes: Meedhuizermeer, Farmsumermeer and the Proostmeer which were poldered between 1870 and 1900. Between 1869 and 1871, the canal of Duurswold was dug and there was a slight expansion.

== Gallery ==
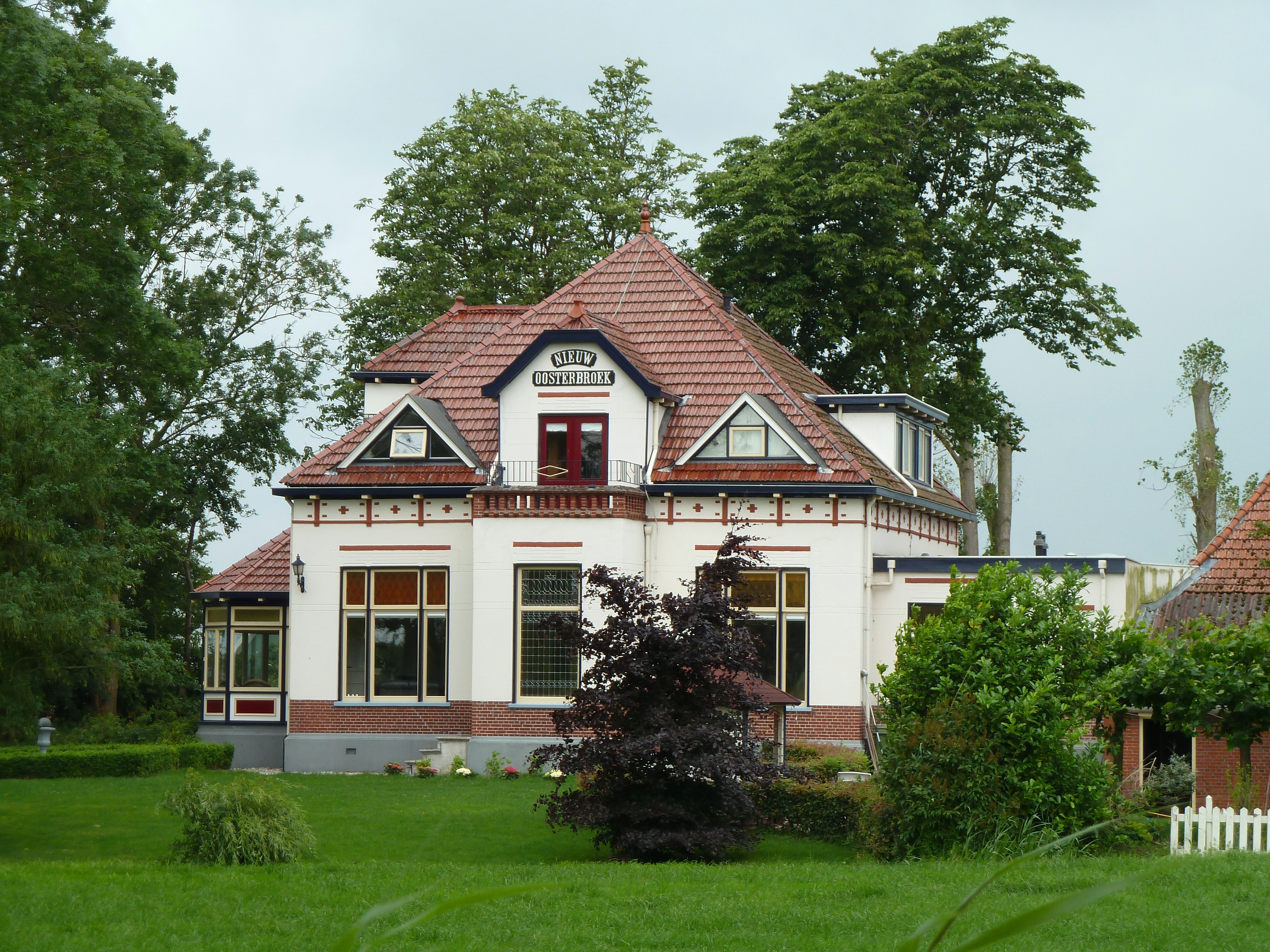
Villa Nieuw Oosterbroek

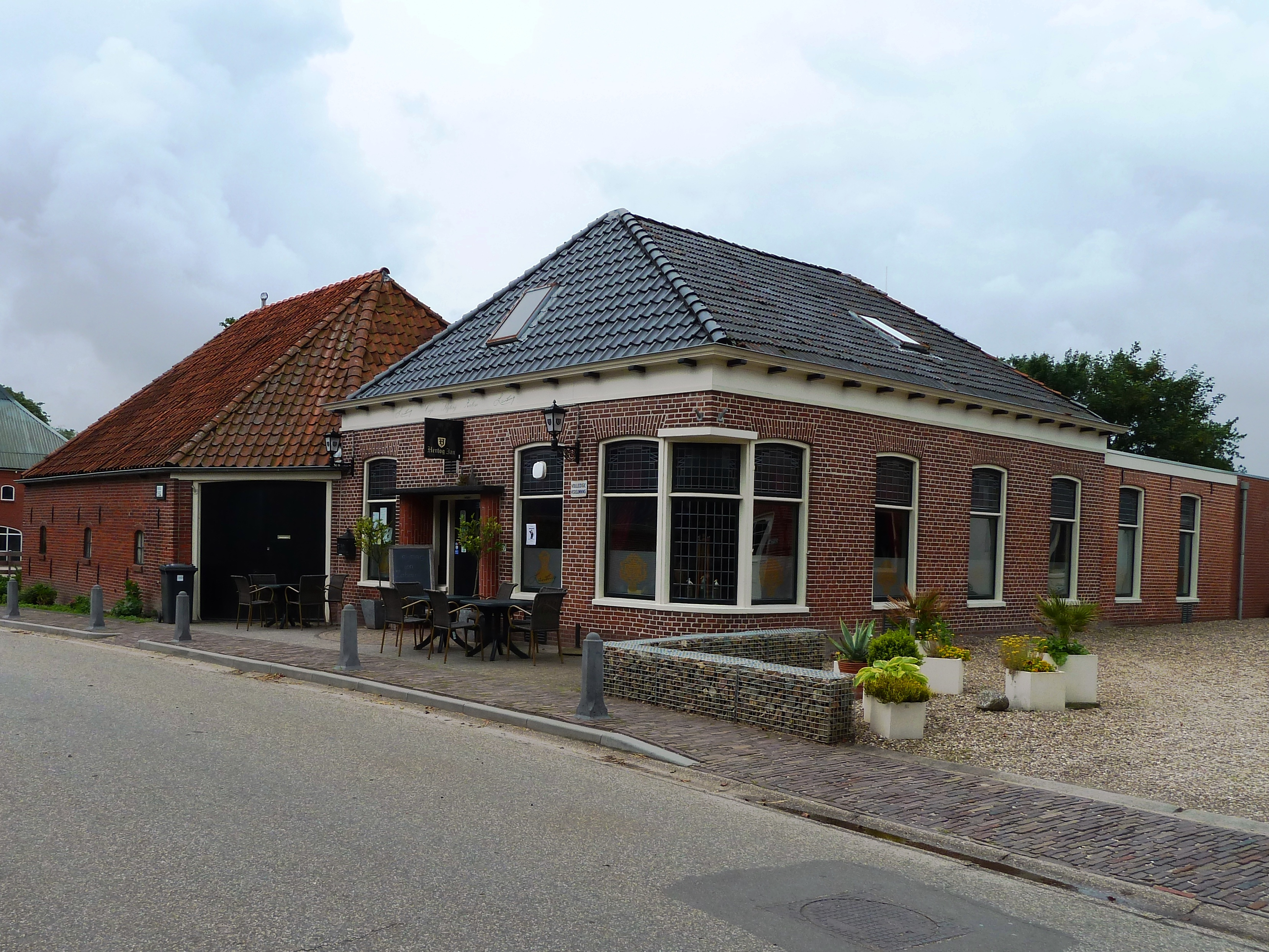
Village pub

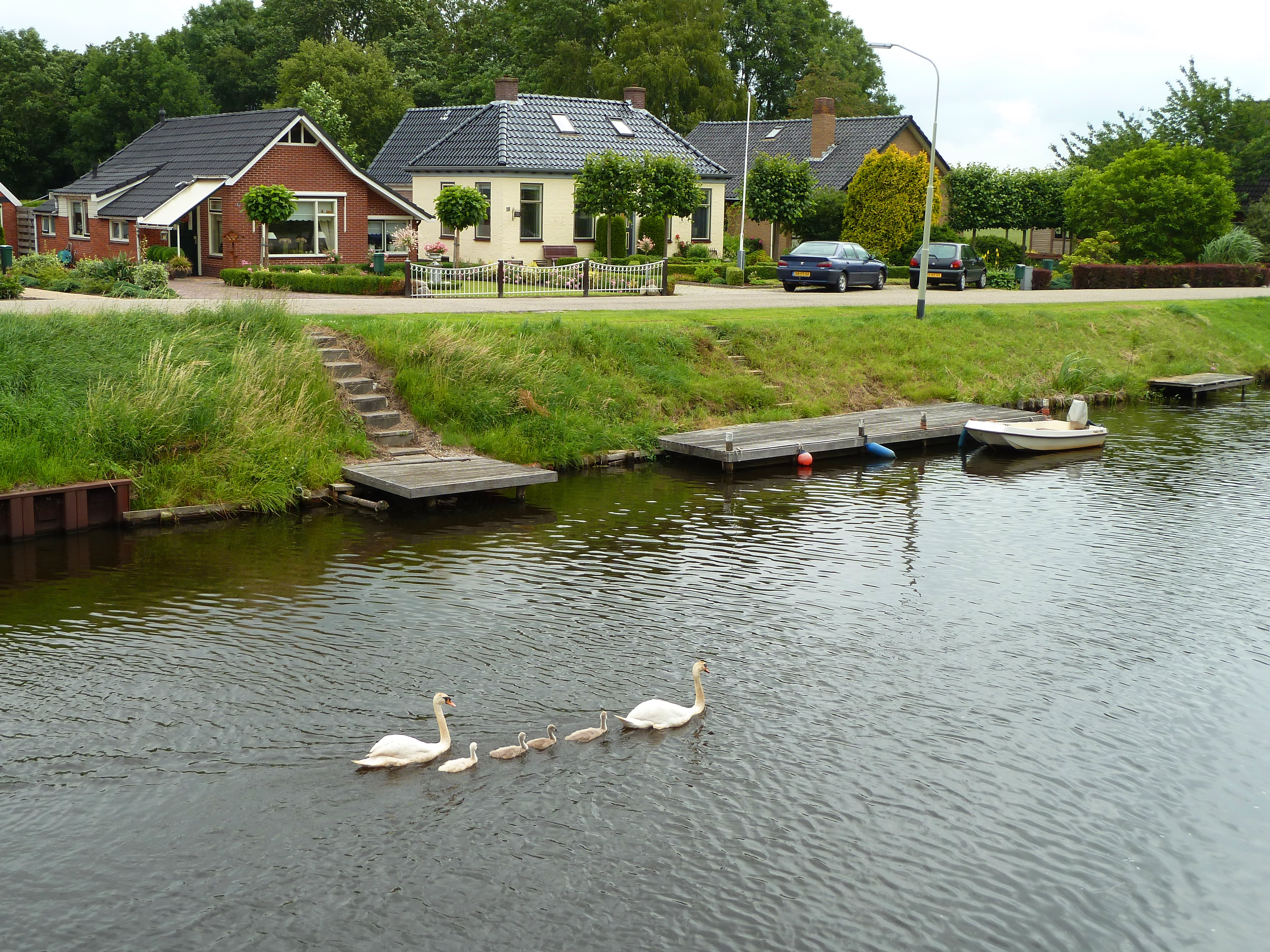
View on the canal

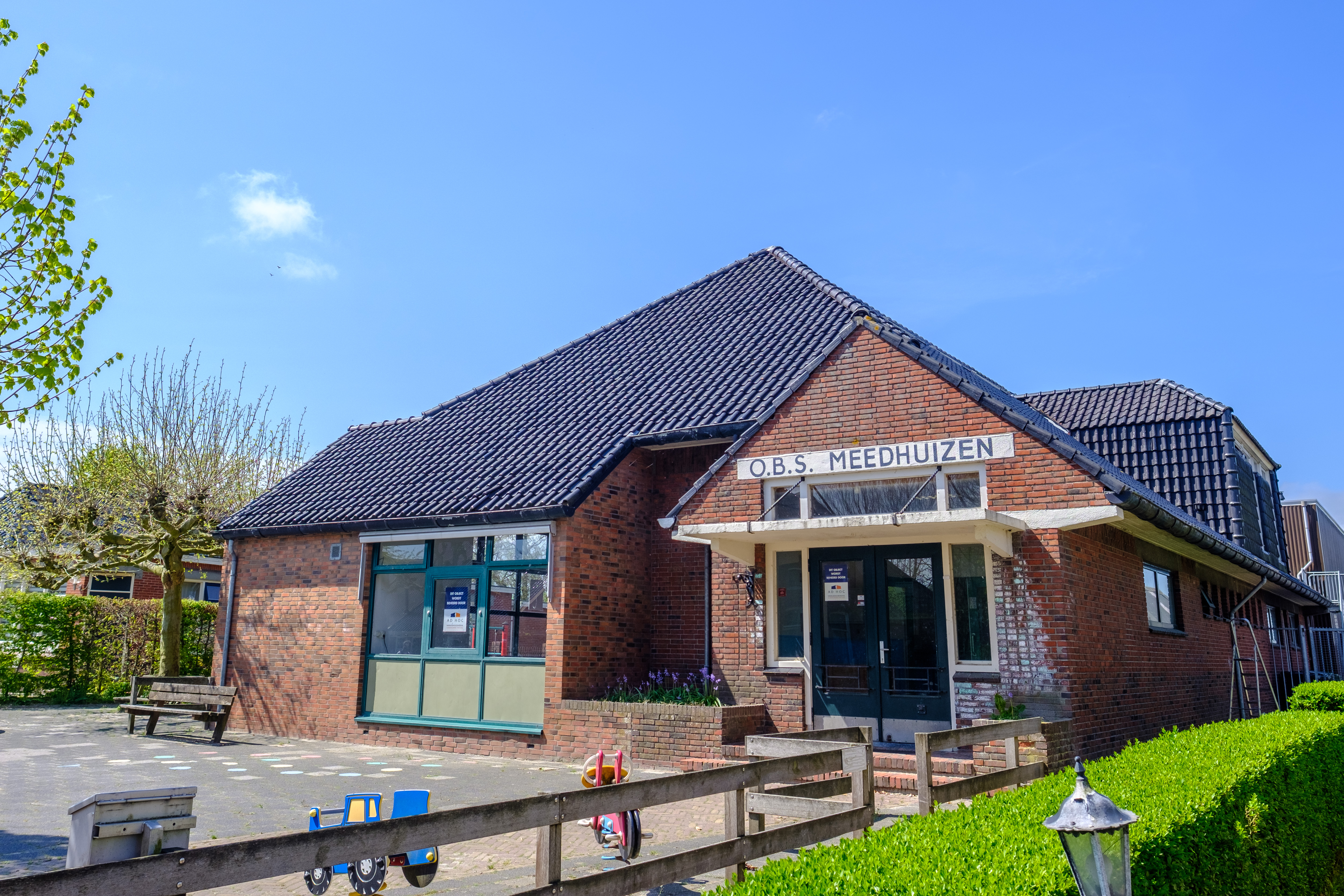
Former school
