= Battle of Wagenborgen =

- Part of Liberation of Delfzijl of World War II
Date	21 April – 23 April 1945
Location	Wagenborgen, the Netherlands
Result	Canadian victory

Belligerents
Canada	Germany

Units involved
Canadian Scottish Regiment	Wehrmacht

The Battle of Wagenborgen (21 - 23 April 1945) was one of the last offensives in the Netherlands during the Liberation of Delfzijl (Operation Canada) of World War II. The Canadians became trapped in the village of Wagenborgen and unexpectedly encountered heavy resistance from the Germans under constant shelling for three days. A total of 27 people were killed.

== Background ==
Wagenborgen held strategic significance for German forces, serving as a gateway to the port of Delfzijl and the Ems River. Due to the mounting hostilities, many residents were able to flee the area in time, but not everybody.

== Battle ==
A large number of Canadian soldiers lost their lives at a farm, which became a focal point of casualties during the conflict. The regiment had entrenched itself along the Stolderijweg, where it came under enemy fire. As a result, dozens of wounded soldiers were transported to the nearby farm, which had been repurposed as an emergency military field hospital. The site also served as a key communication hub, featuring a radio link to coordinate with the platoons and the tactical headquarters. This critical role was eventually discovered by German forces, contributing to the intensity of the attacks on the location.

After a shell struck the roof of the farm, a fire ignited that quickly engulfed the building. The side wall near the cowshed partially collapsed, burying eleven wounded Canadian soldiers who were sheltering inside. Tragically, they were trapped beneath the rubble and perished in the ensuing blaze. Subsequently, newly arrived Canadian forces set up an ambush for the German troops, effectively halting their advance. This action marked the liberation of this part of the northeastern Netherlands.

== Commemorations ==
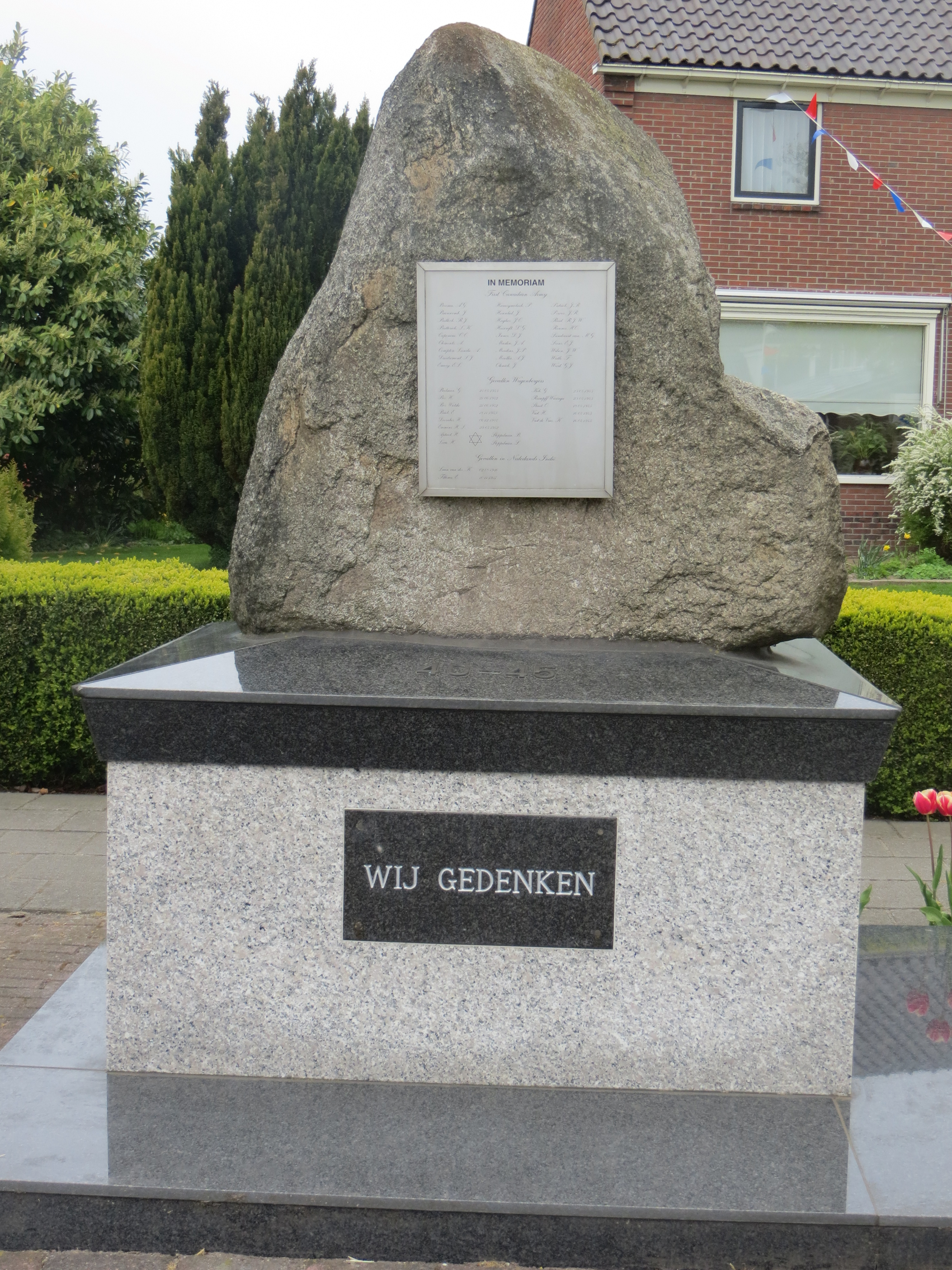
War memorial in Wagenborgen

On 23 April 2005, on the day 60 years after the liberation of Wagenborgen, the battle was commemorated. 75 years after the battle in April 2020 a war memorial was installed at there Stolderijweg, the road of the farm, to commemorate the people who died there. This is another war memorial as in Wagenborgen to commemorate everybody who died.
