= Wagenborgen =

- Village
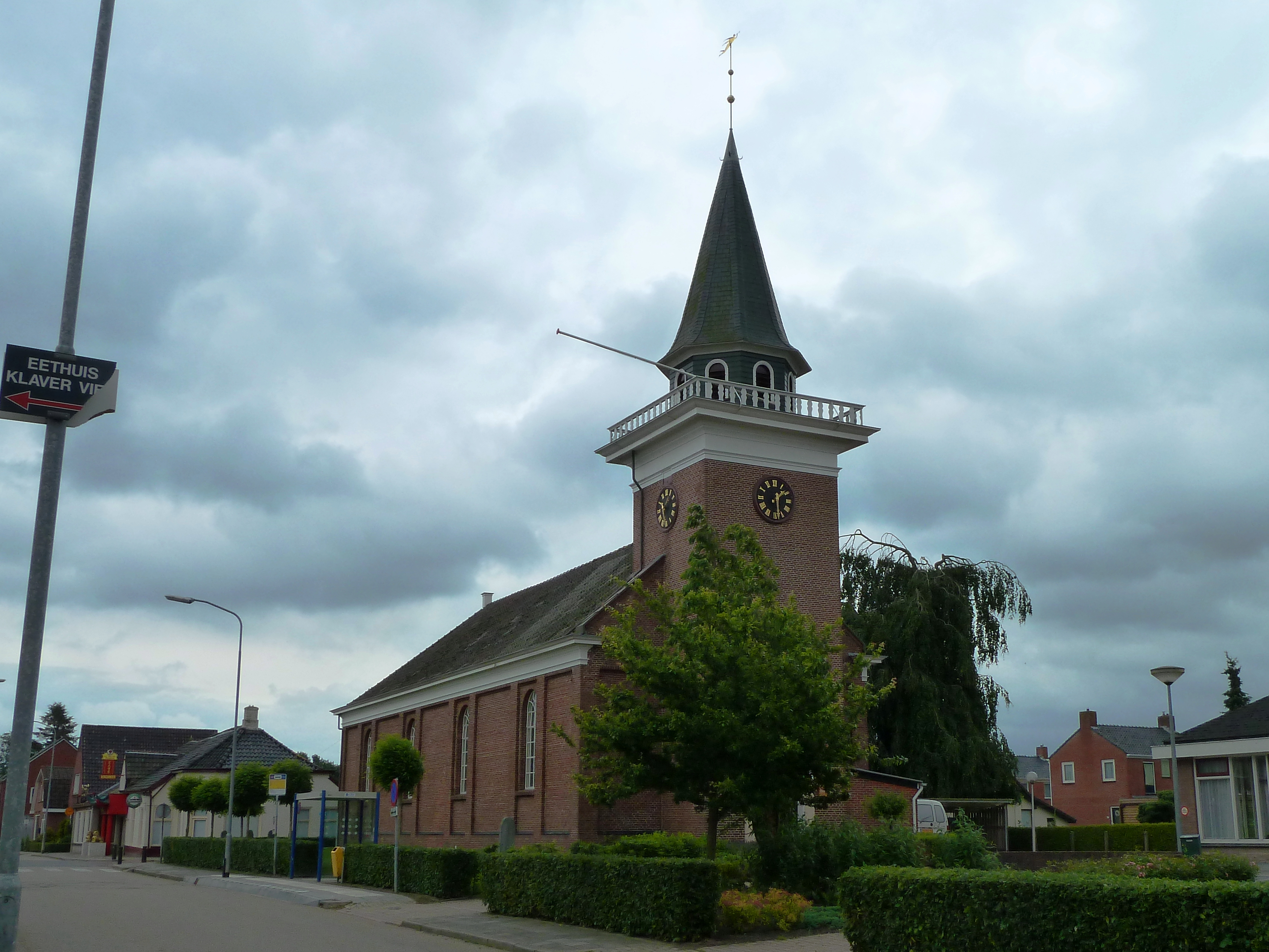
- Protestant Church in 2011

- Location in the province of Groningen in the Netherlands Wagenborgen (Netherlands)
- Coordinates: 53°15′22″N 6°55′56″E
- Country: Netherlands
- Province: Groningen
- Municipality: Eemsdelta

Area
  - Total: 1.32 km^{2} (0.51 sq mi)
- Elevation: −1.5 m (−4.9 ft)

Population (2021)
  - Total: 1,685
  - Density: 1,280/km^{2} (3,310/sq mi)
- Time zone: UTC+1 (CET)
  - Summer (DST): UTC+2 (CEST)
- Postal code: 9945
- Dialing code: 0596

Wagenborgen (Dutch: [ˈʋaːɣə(m)ˌbɔrɣə(n)]; Gronings: Woagenbörgen [ˈʋʊːŋ̍bœːŋ̍]) is a village in the Dutch province of Groningen. It is a part of the municipality of Eemsdelta, and lies about 25 km east of Groningen.

== History ==
The village was first mentioned in 1446 as wagenbergen. Based on the earlies references, it means "settlement on higher ground by Wago (person)". Wagenborgen is a road village which developed on a sandy ridge in the 11th century.

The Dutch Reformed church was built in 1883 in neoclassic style as a replacement for the medieval church.

Wagenborgen was home to 630 people in 1840.

== Groot Bronswijk ==
The Brons family used to own a forge in the village where steam powered threshing machines were manufactured. This would lead to the foundation of Brons motor vehicles. In 1873, the charity "Tot Christelijke Liefdadigheid" was founded by the family, and Groot Bronswijk was established to next year to care for people with psychiatric problems.

In 1940, Groot Bronswijk developed into a professional psychiatric hospital. The building was destroyed in 1970 by arson causing the death of 17 patients. In 1992, most of the patients were moved to other hospitals, and in 2006 most of the buildings were demolished.

== Gallery ==
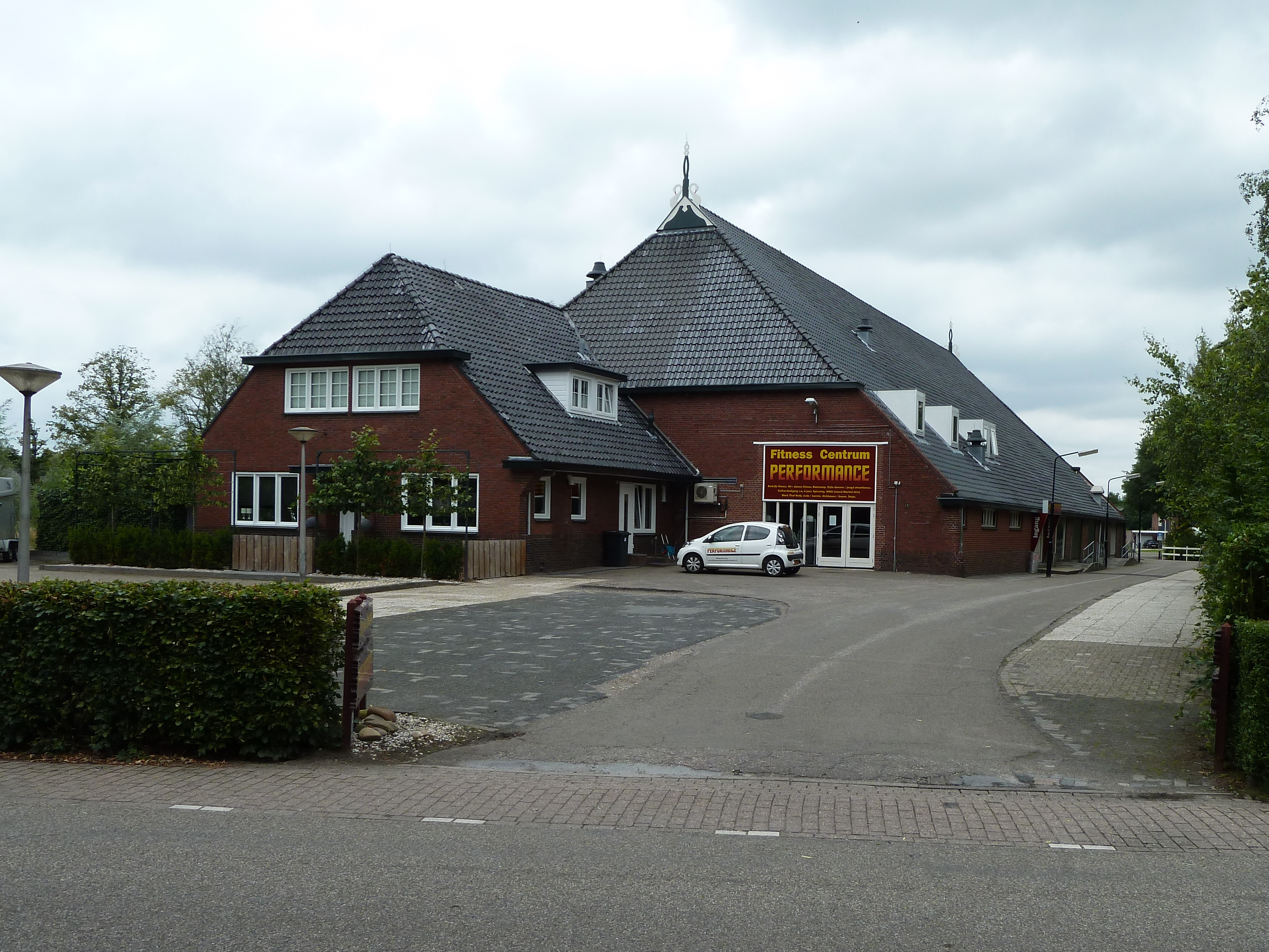
Groot Bronswijk

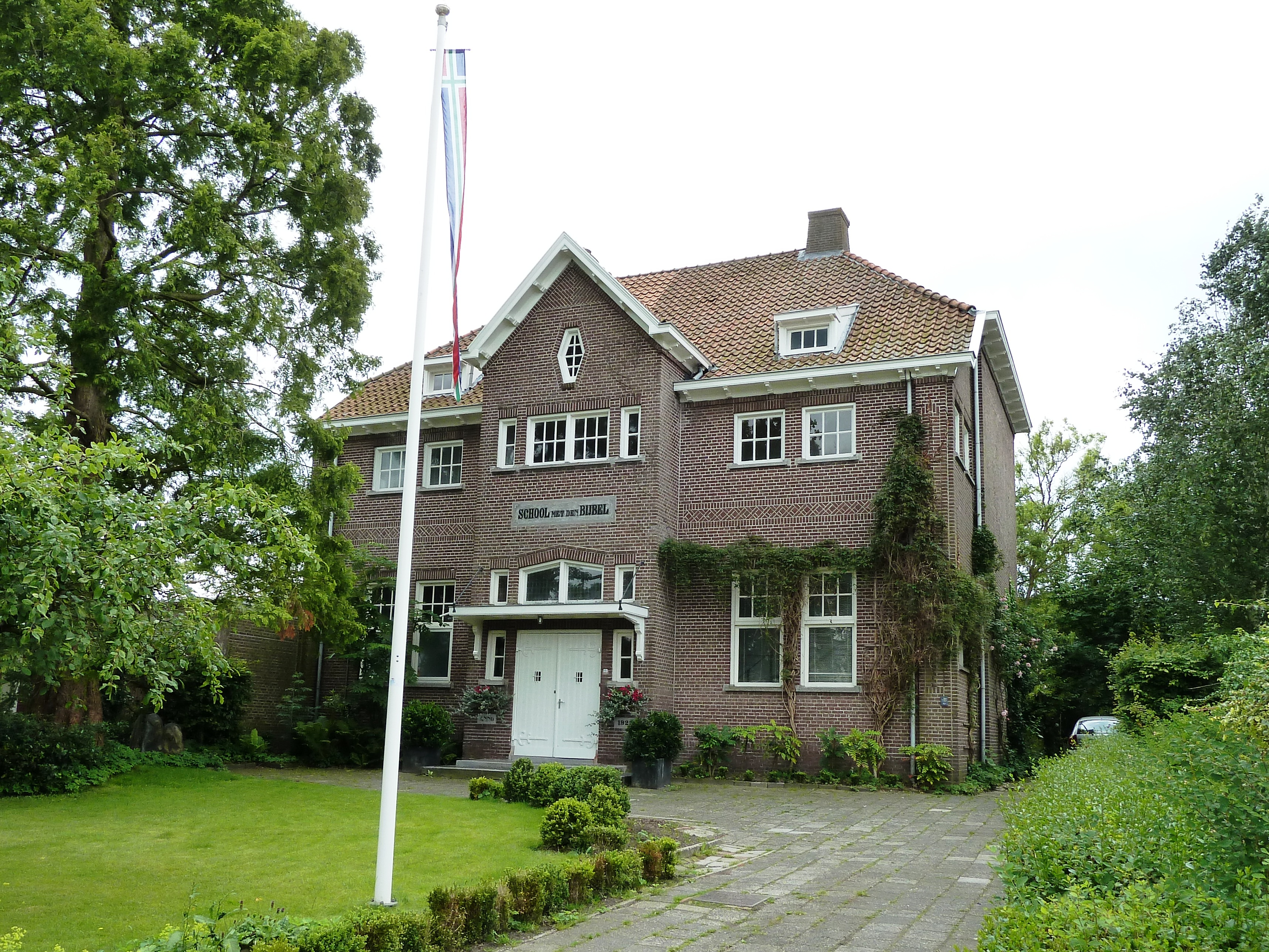
Former school

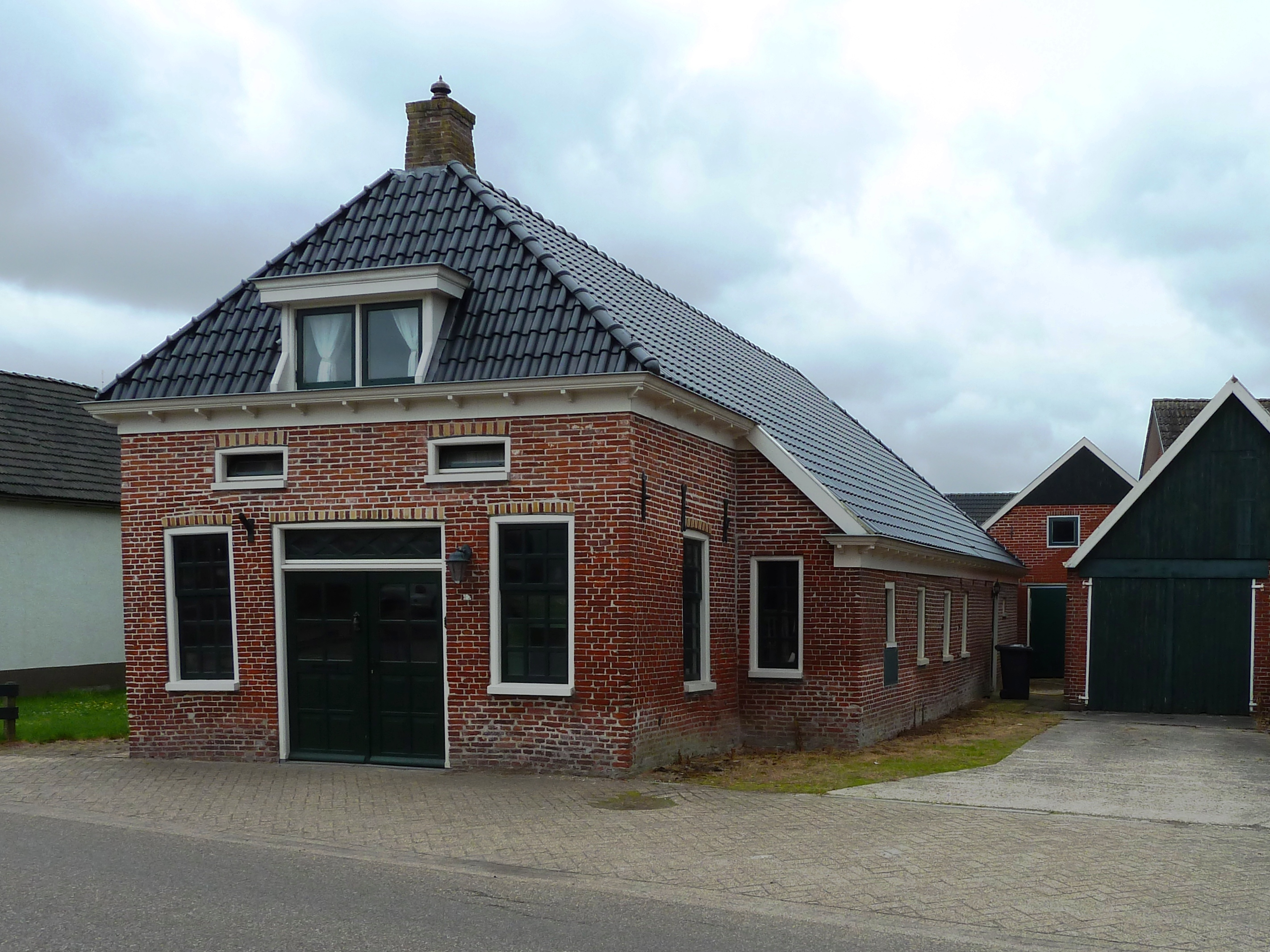
House in Wagenborgen

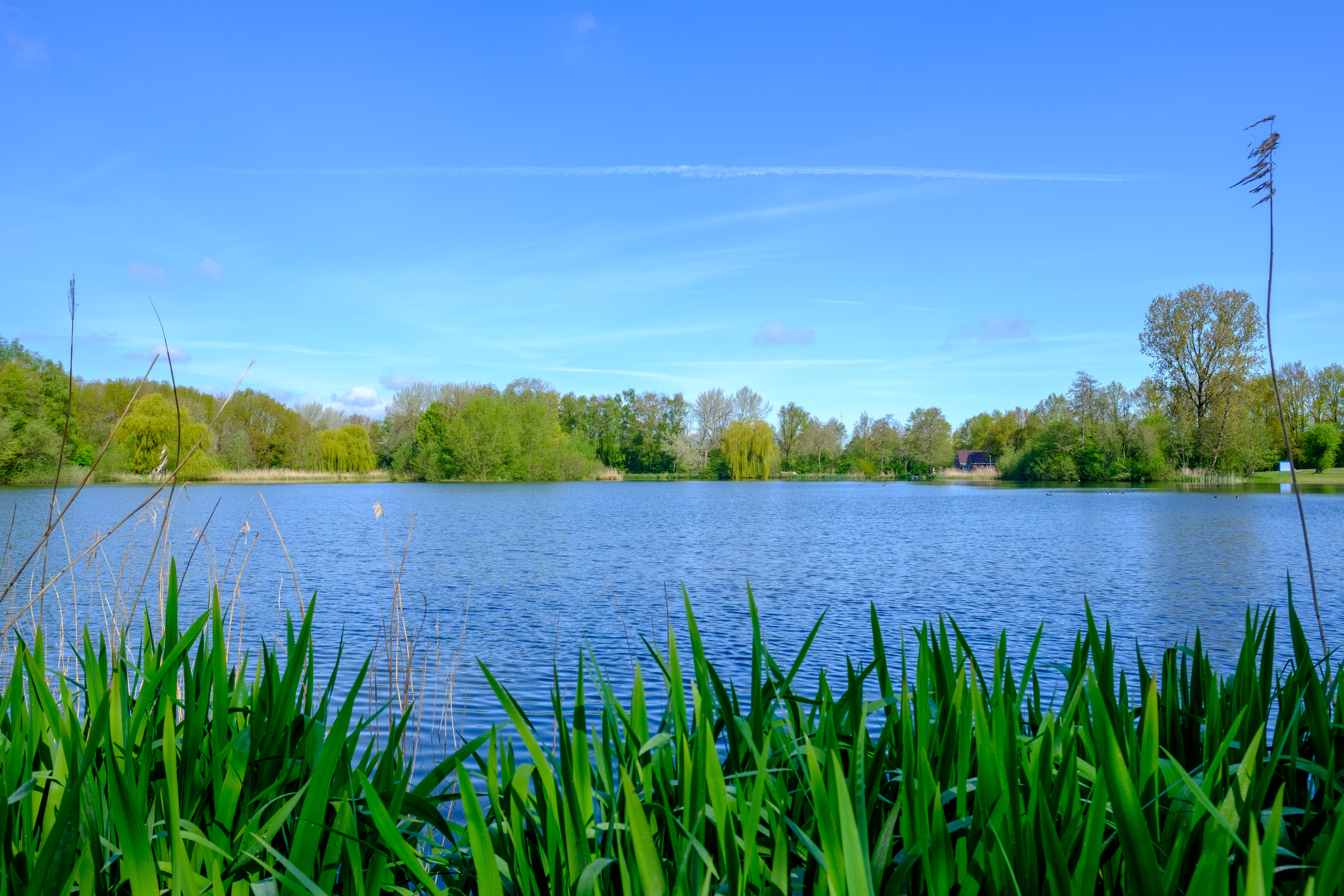
Proostmeer

== See also ==
- Battle of Wagenborgen
