= Gerhard Diephuis =

Dutch jurist

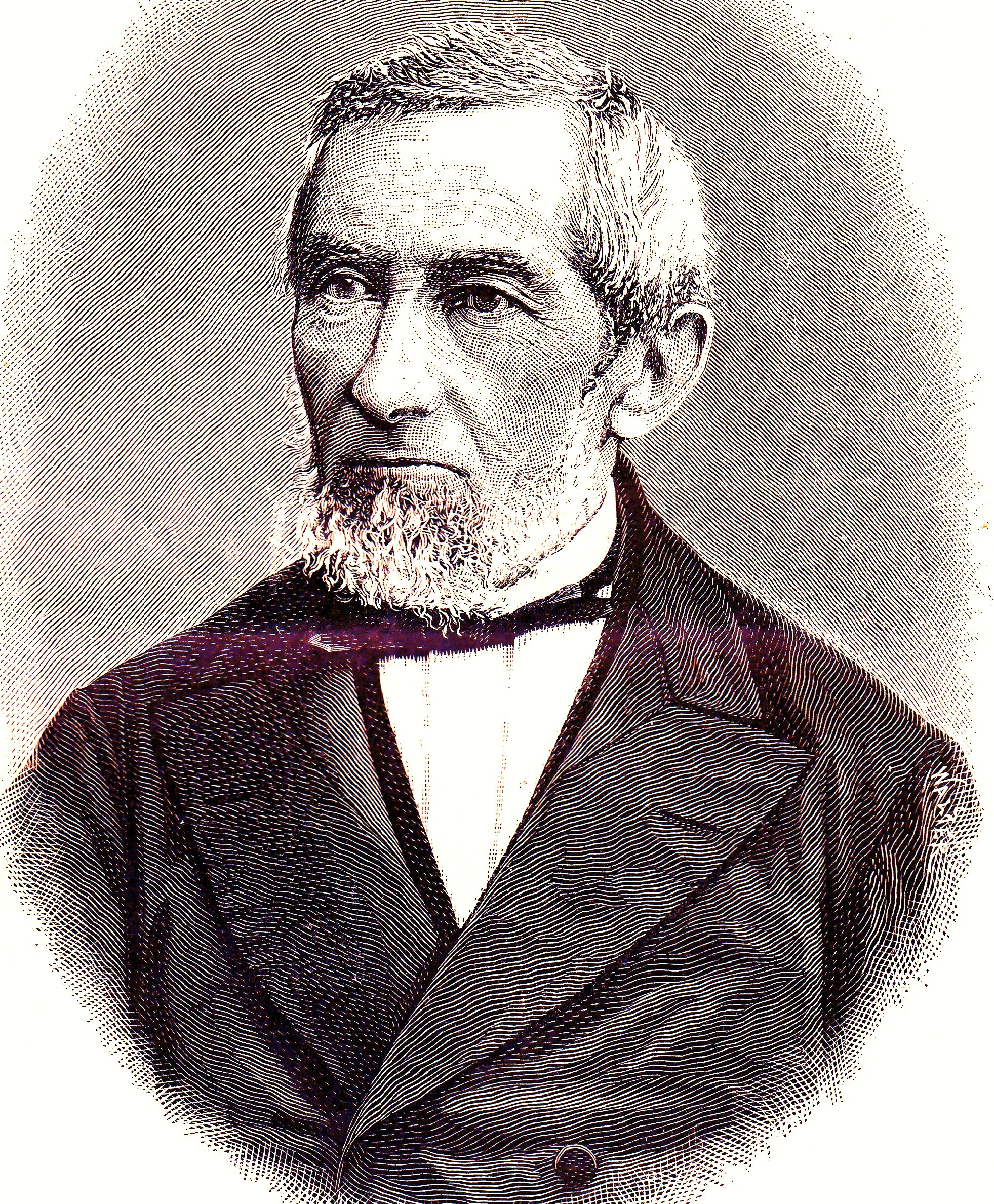

Gerhardus (Gerard) Diephuis (6 February 1817, Farmsum – 4 November 1892, Groningen) was a Dutch jurist.

After studies in Groningen, he was a judge with the arrondissement court in Winschoten and later with a higher court in Groningen. In 1840 he married Alagonda Geertruida Hemmes, with whom he had ten children. In 1859 he became a full professor at the university of Groningen. During the period 1864–1865 he was the rector magnificus of this institution.

Diephuis was a leading proponent of legism and of the primacy of legislation. Influenced by French teachings, he wrote numerous textbooks on Dutch civil law. He was also instrumental in further diminishing the influence of Roman and customary law in favour of codified legislation.
