= Middelstum =

- Village
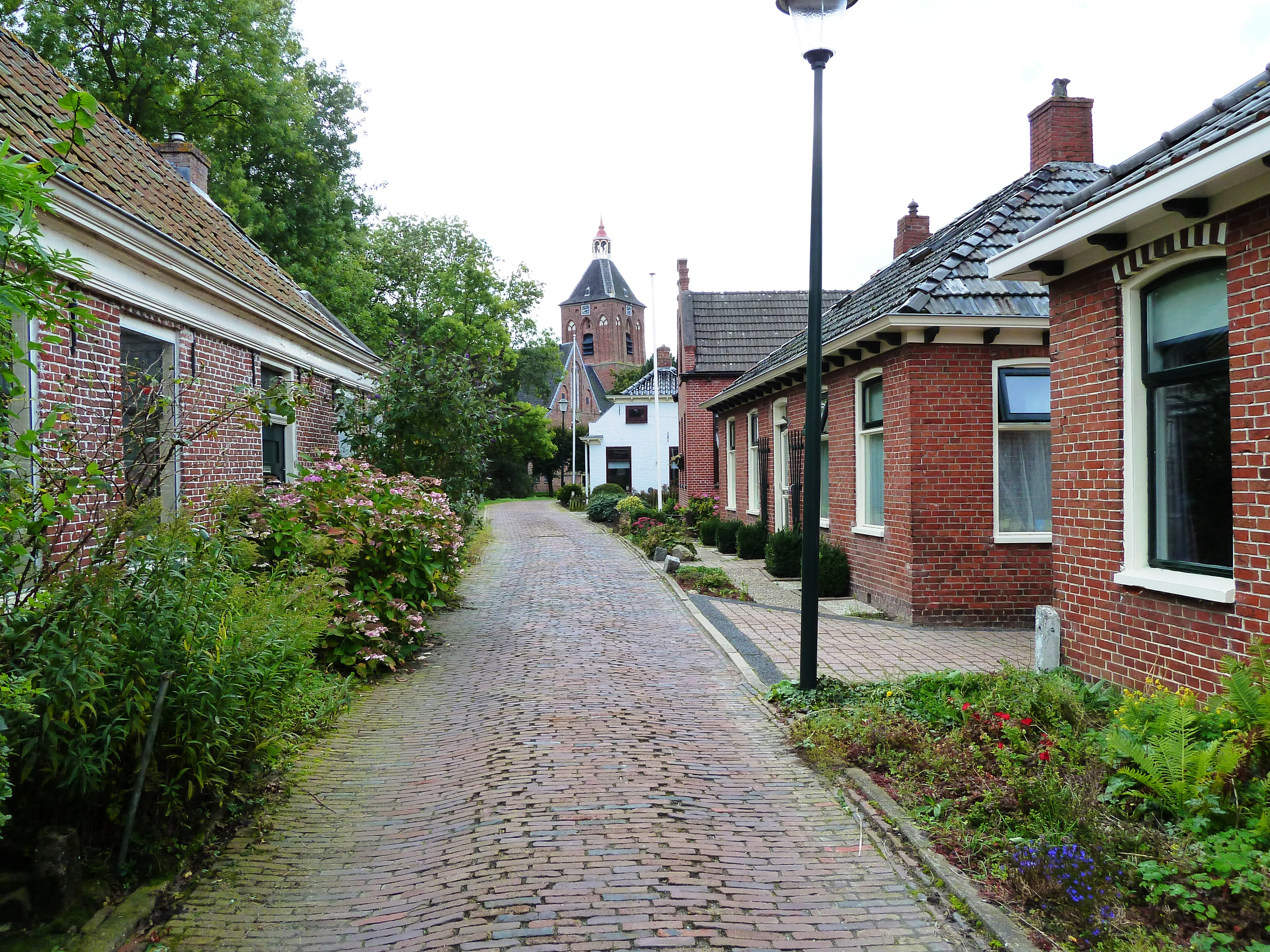
- Middelstum in 2010

- Location of Middelstum in the province of Groningen Middelstum (Netherlands)
- Coordinates: 53°20′46″N 6°38′29″E
- Country: Netherlands
- Province: Groningen
- Municipality: Eemsdelta

Area
  - Total: 25.17 km^{2} (9.72 sq mi)
- Elevation: 1.8 m (5.9 ft)

Population (2021)
  - Total: 2,325
  - Density: 92.37/km^{2} (239.2/sq mi)
- Time zone: UTC+1 (CET)
  - Summer (DST): UTC+2 (CEST)
- Postal code: 9991
- Dialing code: 0595

Middelstum (Dutch pronunciation: [ˈmɪdəlstʏm]; Gronings: Middelsom [ˈmɪdl̩sɔm]) is a village with a population of 2,419 in the province of Groningen in the Netherlands. It is located in the municipality of Eemsdelta.

Middelstum was a separate municipality until 1990, when it was merged with Loppersum.

== History ==
The village was first mentioned between 822 and 856 as Mitilistenheim, and means "settlement in the middle". Middelstum is a terp (artificial living hill) village which probably developed in Roman times. It consists of three "house" terps which have grown together. It has a radial structure and ring road.

The Dutch Reformed church was built in several stages during the 15th century. The tower dates from 1487. Between 1661 and 1662, a dome with carillon was place on top of the tower.

Middelstum was home to 1,737 people in 1840.

== Gallery ==
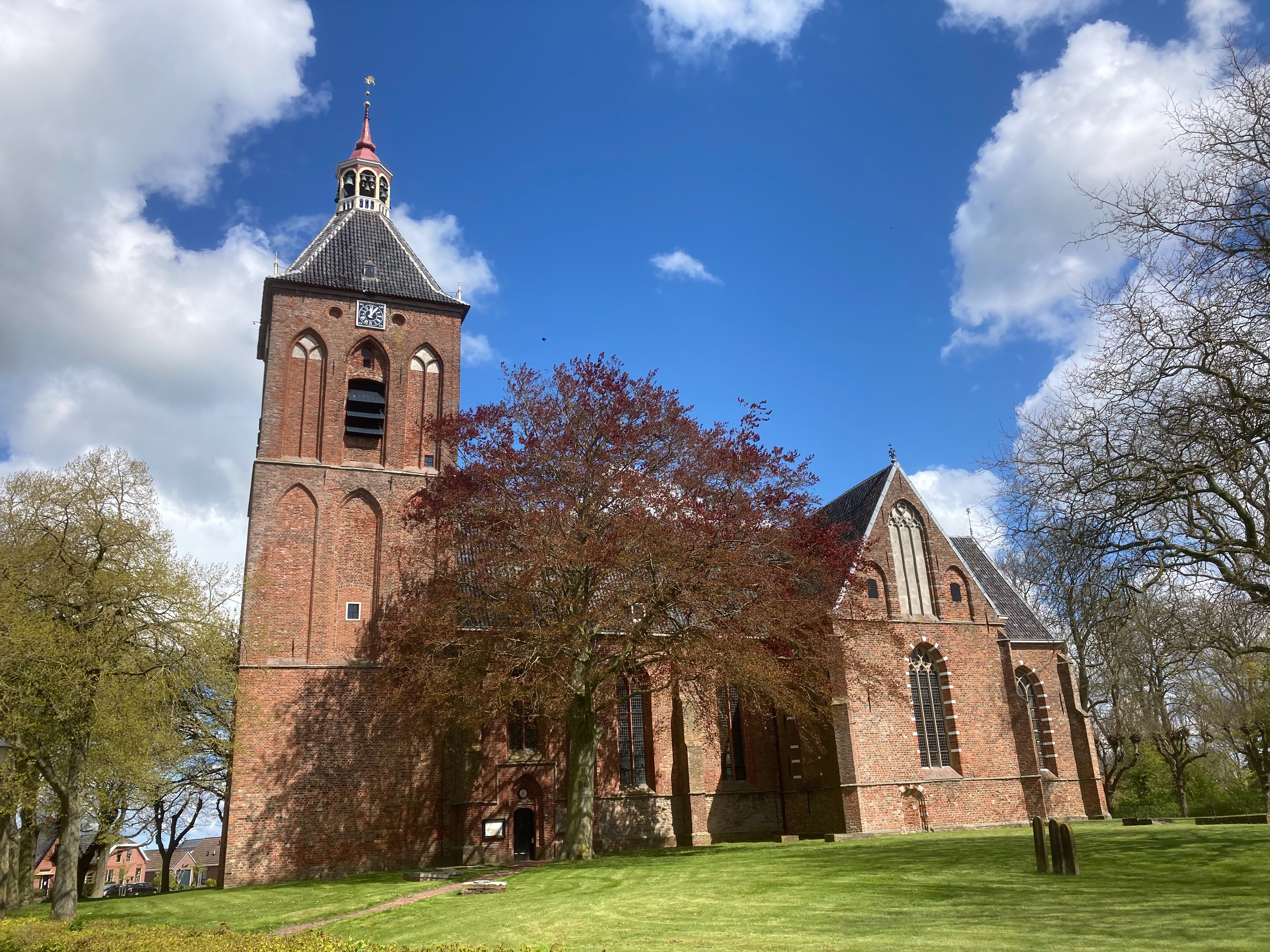
Church of Middelstum

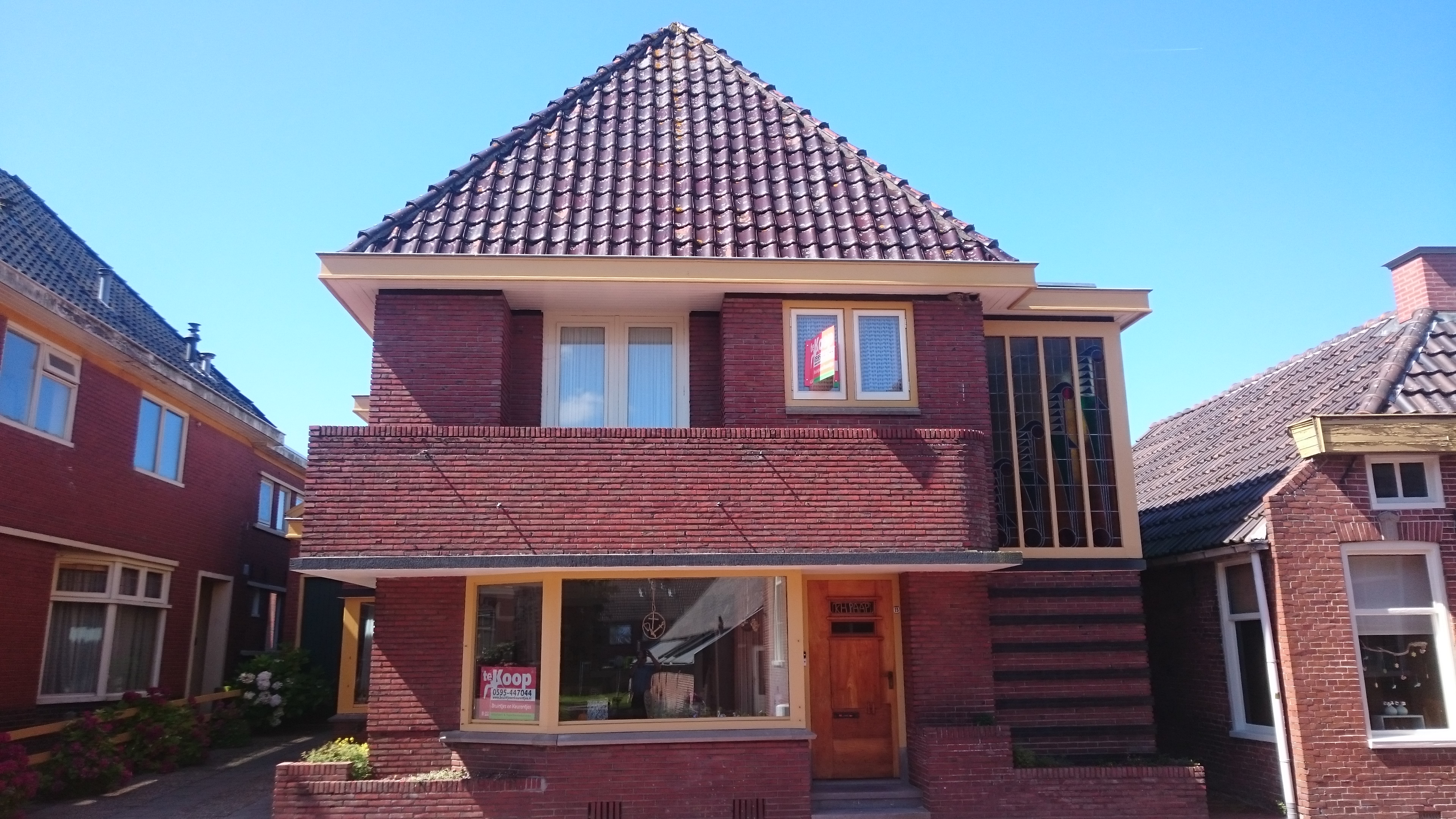
House in Middelstum

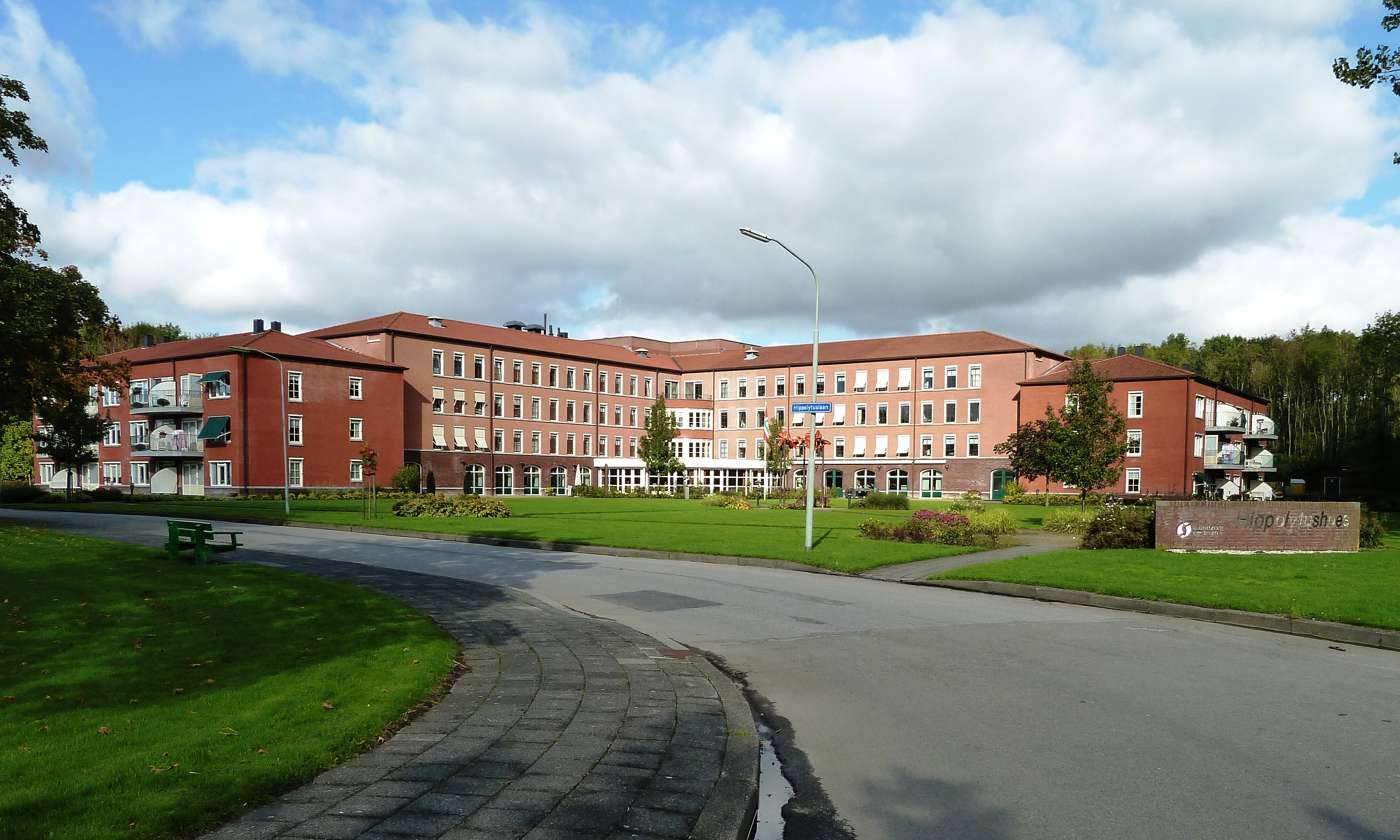
Retirement home of Middelstum
