= Farmsum =

- Village
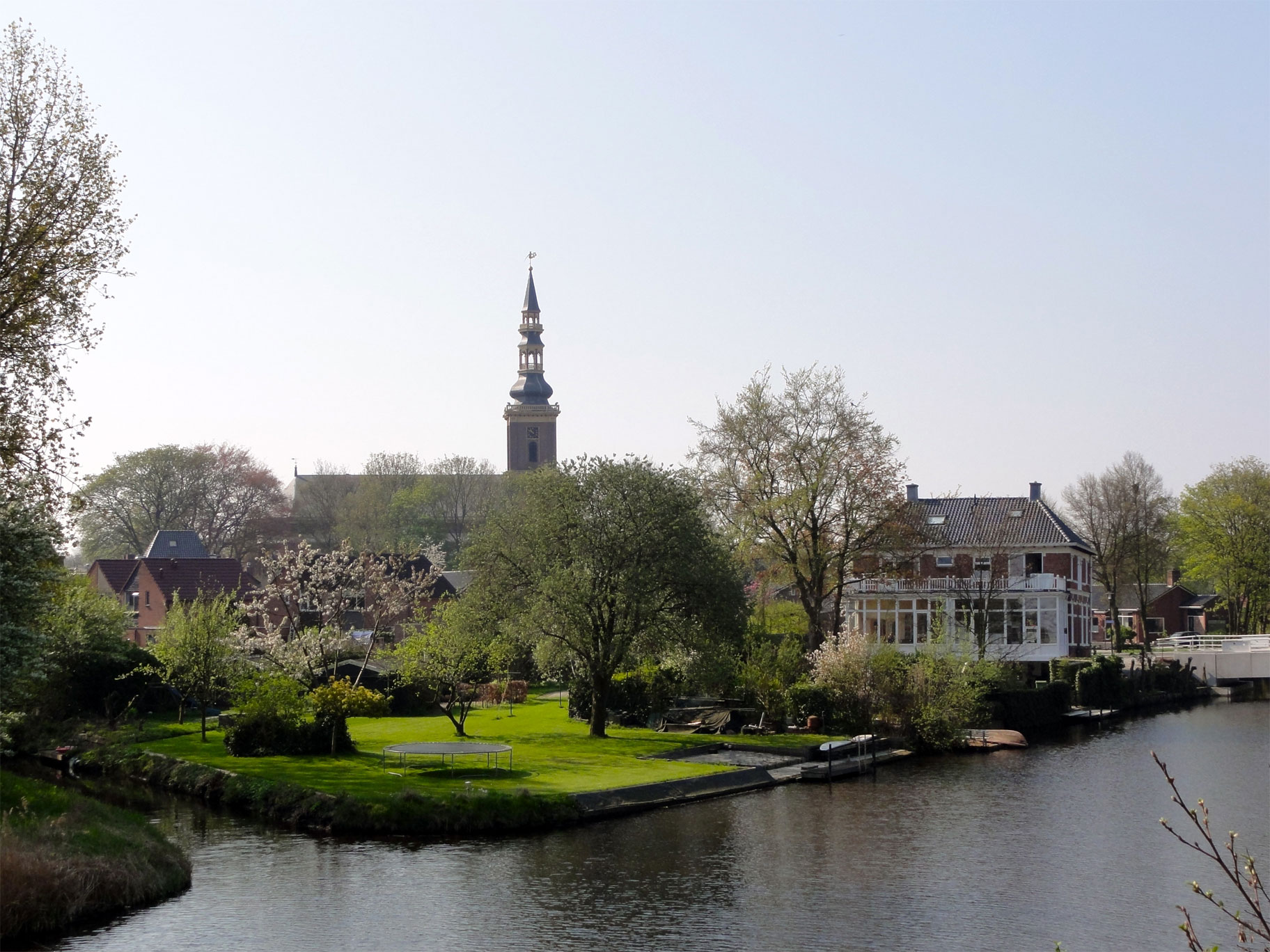

- Flag Coat of arms

- Location in the province of Groningen in the Netherlands Farmsum (Netherlands)
- Coordinates: 53°19′N 6°56′E
- Country: Netherlands
- Province: Groningen
- Municipality: Eemsdelta

Area
  - Total: 2.13 km^{2} (0.82 sq mi)
- Elevation: 0.5 m (1.6 ft)

Population (2021)
  - Total: 1,605
  - Density: 754/km^{2} (1,950/sq mi)
- Time zone: UTC+1 (CET)
  - Summer (DST): UTC+2 (CEST)
- Postal code: 9936
- Dialing code: 0596
- Website: Official

Farmsum (Dutch pronunciation: [ˈfɑr(ə)msʏm]; Gronings: Faarmsom [ˈfaːmsɔm]) is a village in the Dutch province of Groningen. It is a part of the municipality of Eemsdelta.

== History ==
The village was first mentioned in the 10th or 11th century as "de Fretmarashem", and means "settlement of Fretmar". Farmsum was built on several house terps (artificial living hills) in the early middle ages. Farmsum used to be a proosdij (deanery) which ruled over 36 parishes.

In 1515, Farmsum was burnt down by Magnus I, Duke of Saxe-Lauenburg. Farmsum was an independent municipality from 1808 until 1811 when it became part of Delfzijl. In 1814, it was destroyed by the French under Napoleon who had taken Delfzijl and wanted a clearer view on the countryside for defence.

Huis te Farmsum was an estate built in the early 13th century. In 1499, it was destroyed by the city of Groningen. It was finally demolished in 1812. The tower of the Dutch Reformed church was rebuilt between 1856 and 1857. In 1869, the church was rebuilt. The tower was struck by lightning in 1928.

Farmsum was home to 1,184 people in 1840.

== Notable people ==
- Gerhard Diephuis, jurist

== Gallery ==
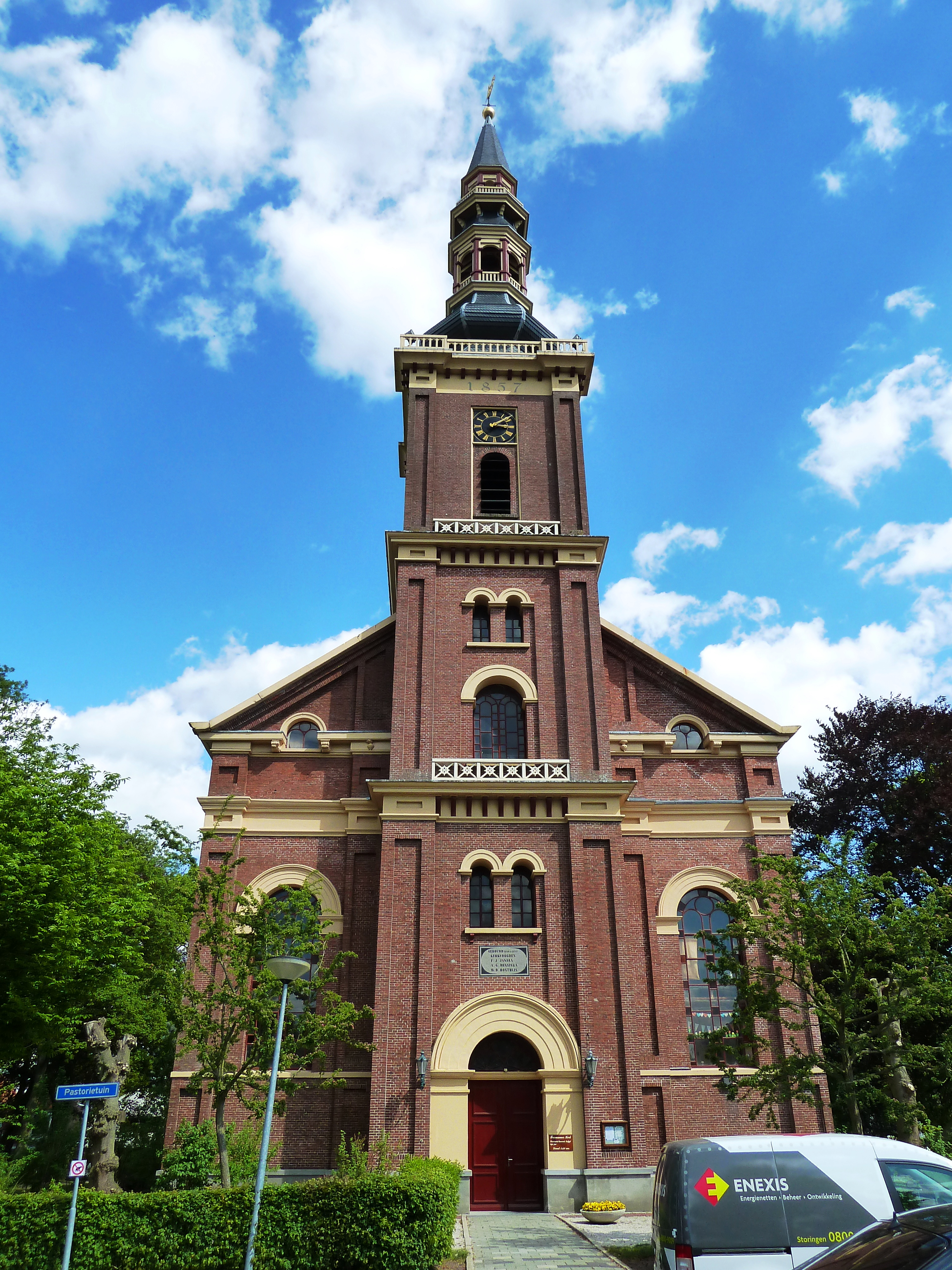
Church in Farmsum

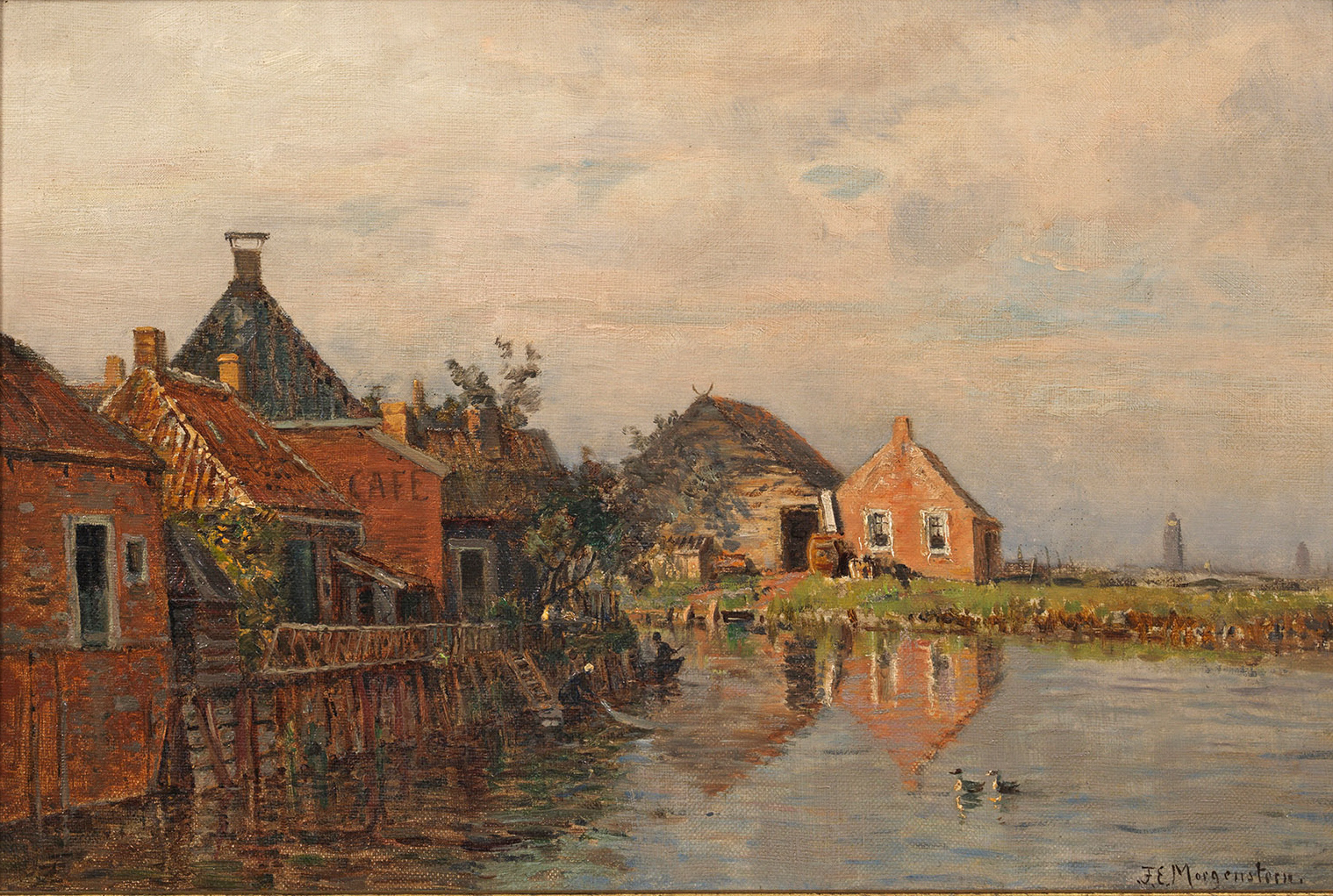
Painting of Farmsum (before 1919)

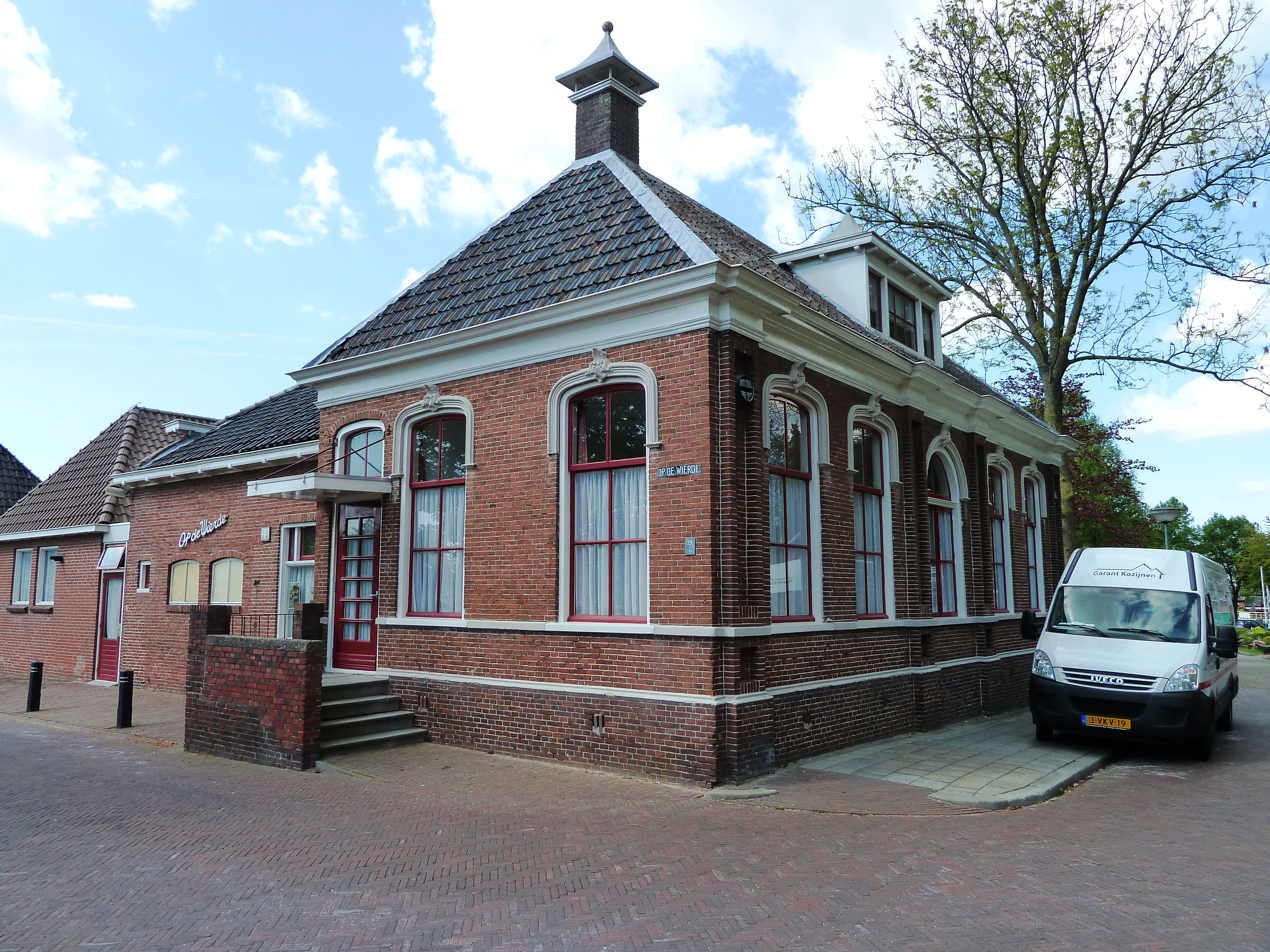
Former clergy house

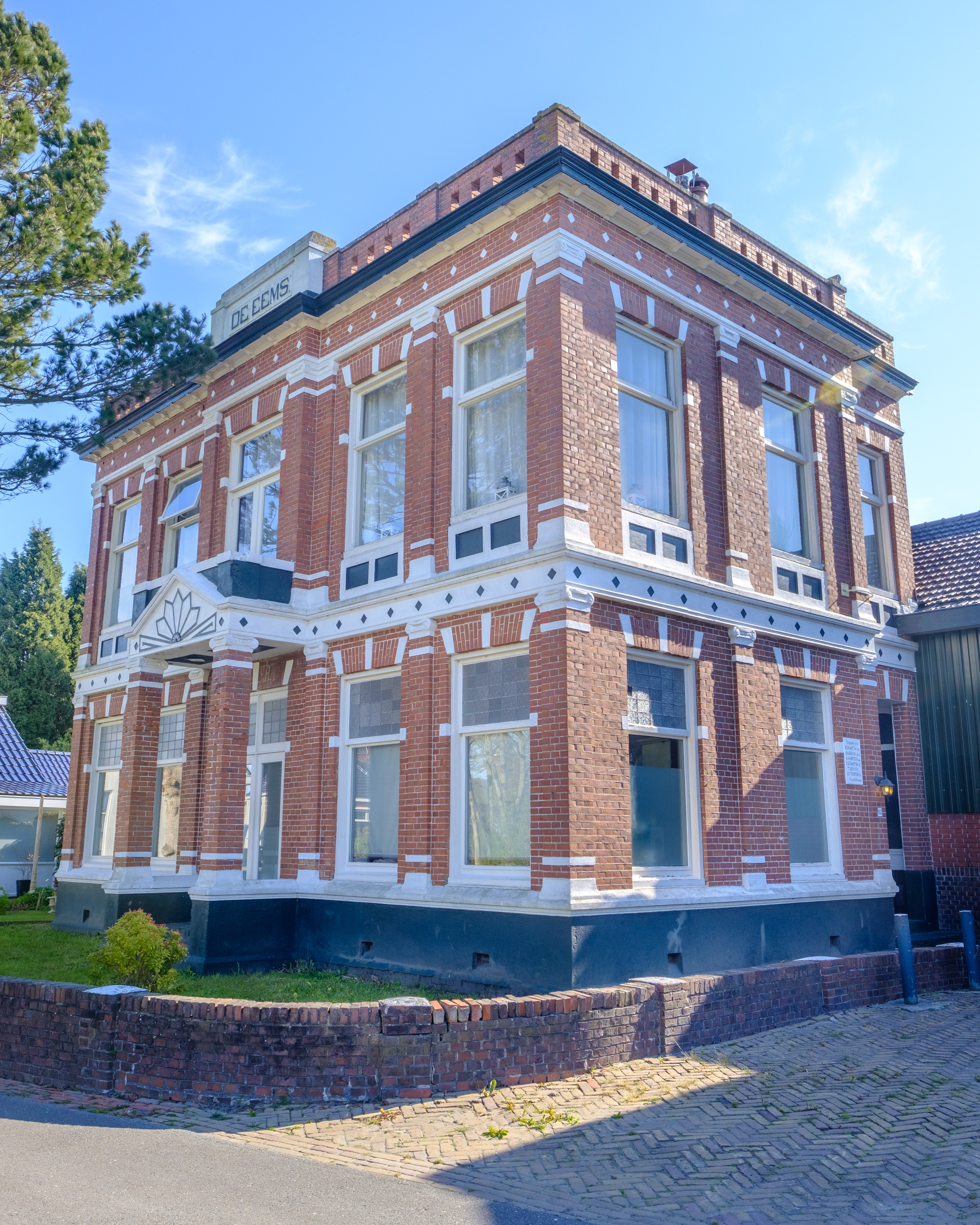
Villa De Eems
