= Eemsdelta =

Coordinates: 53°20′N 6°50′E

- Municipality
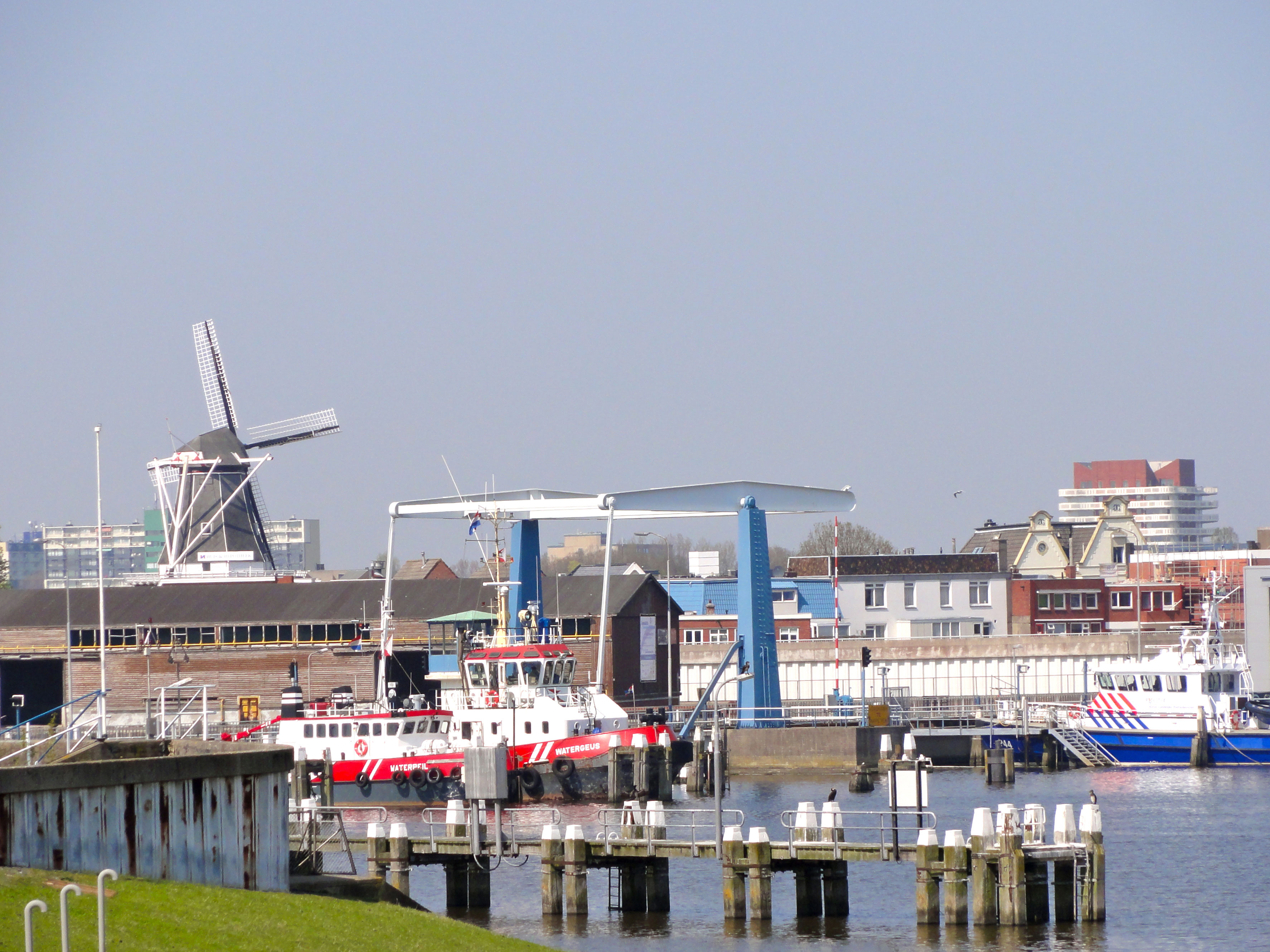
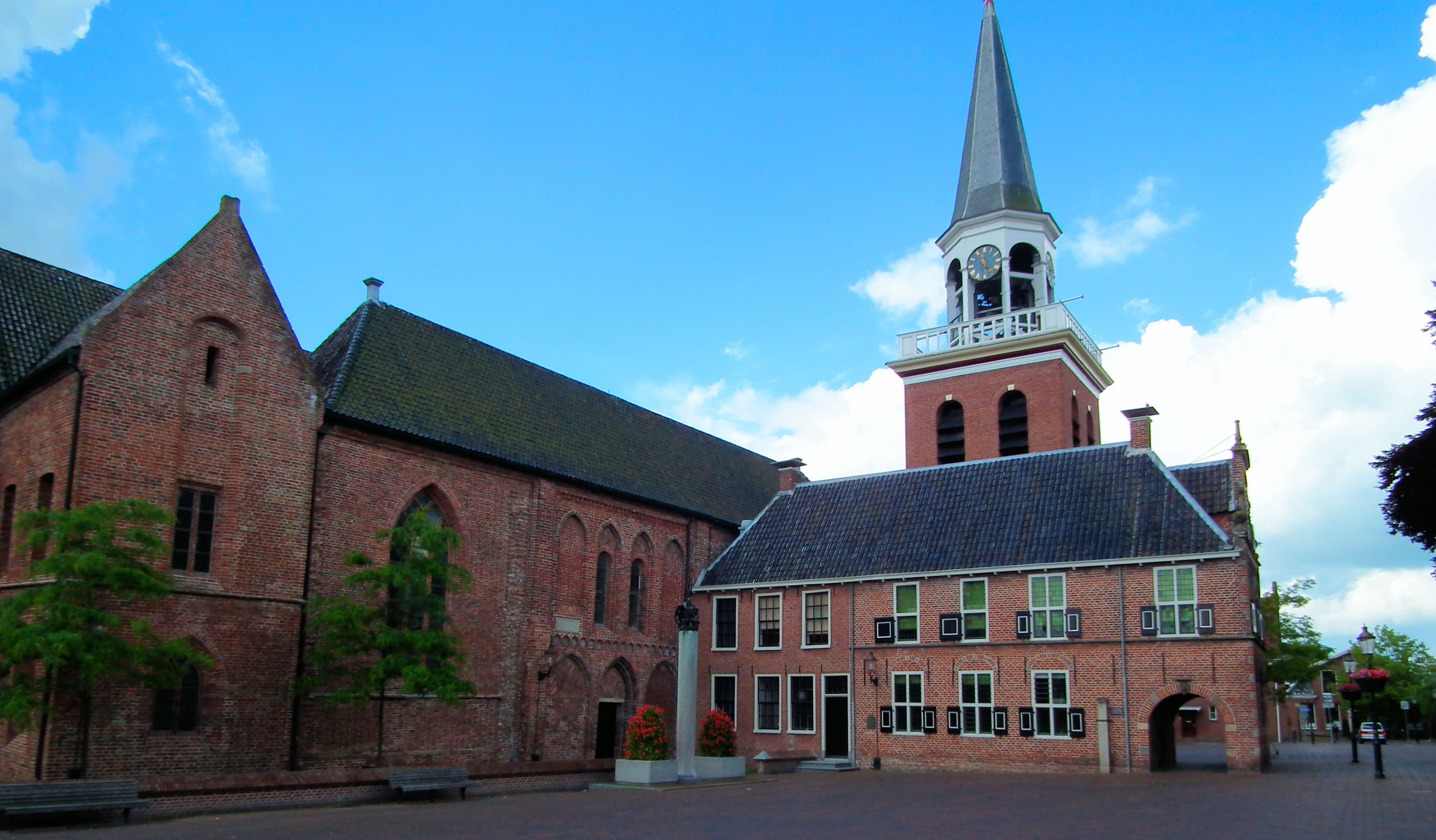
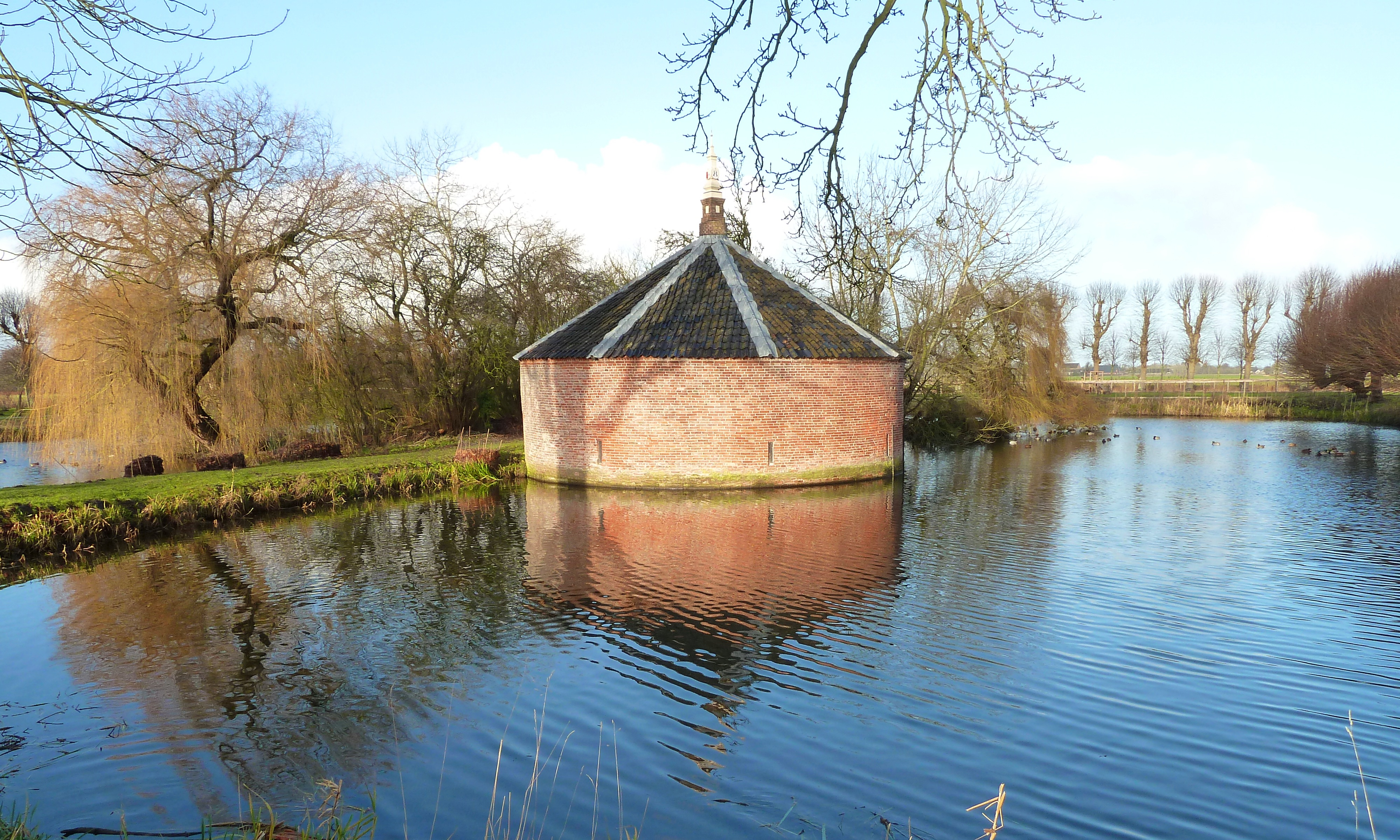
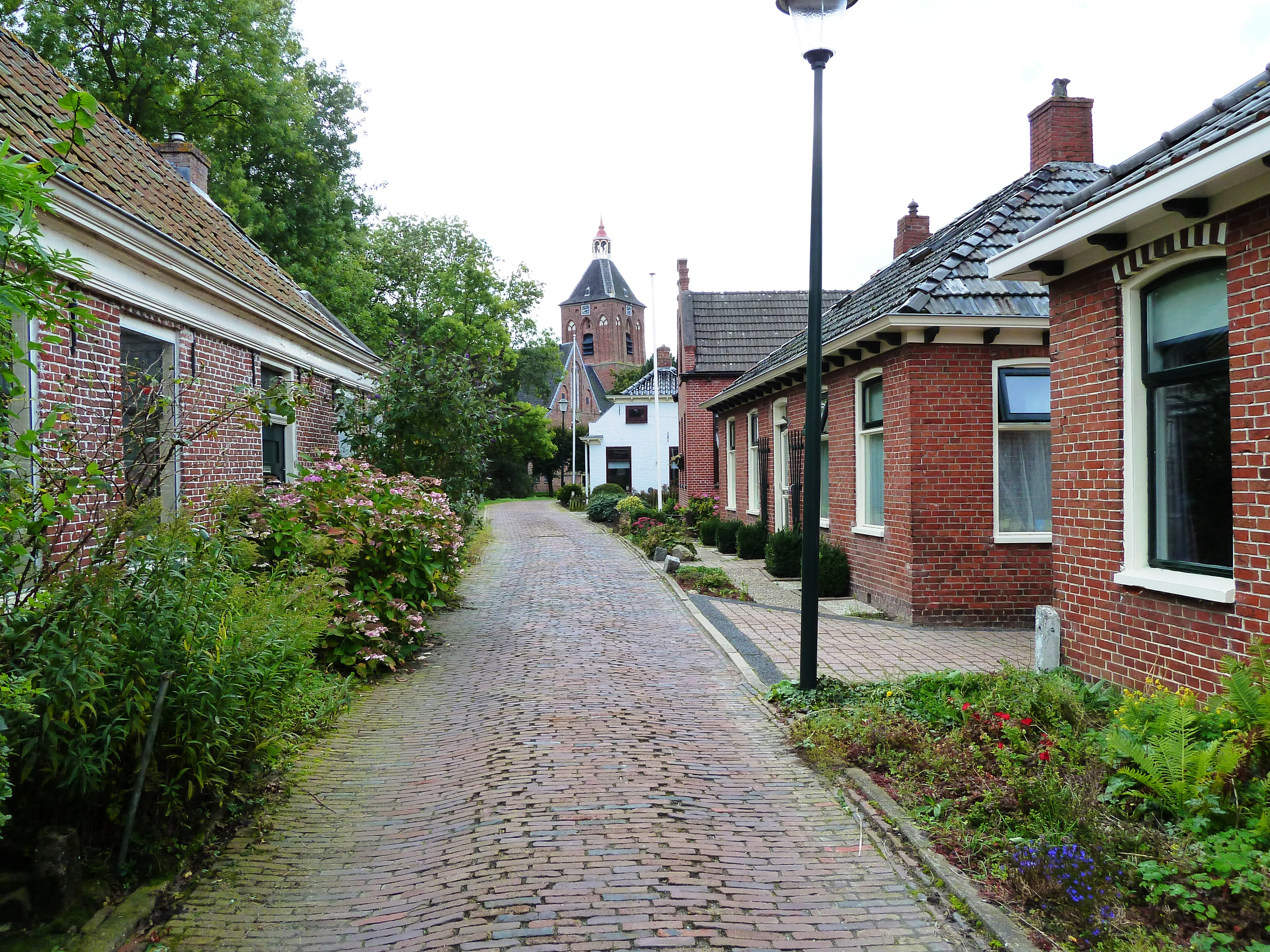
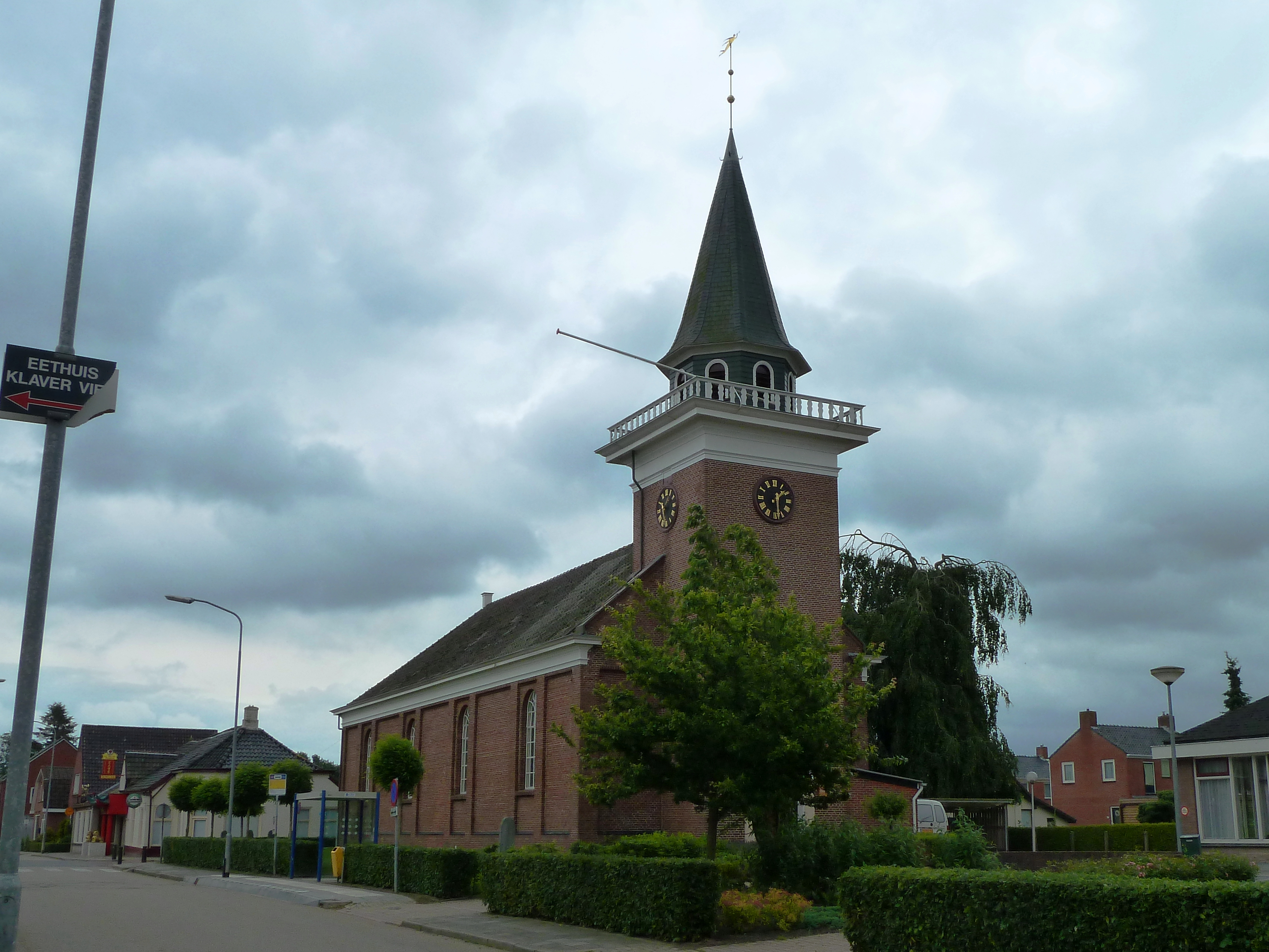
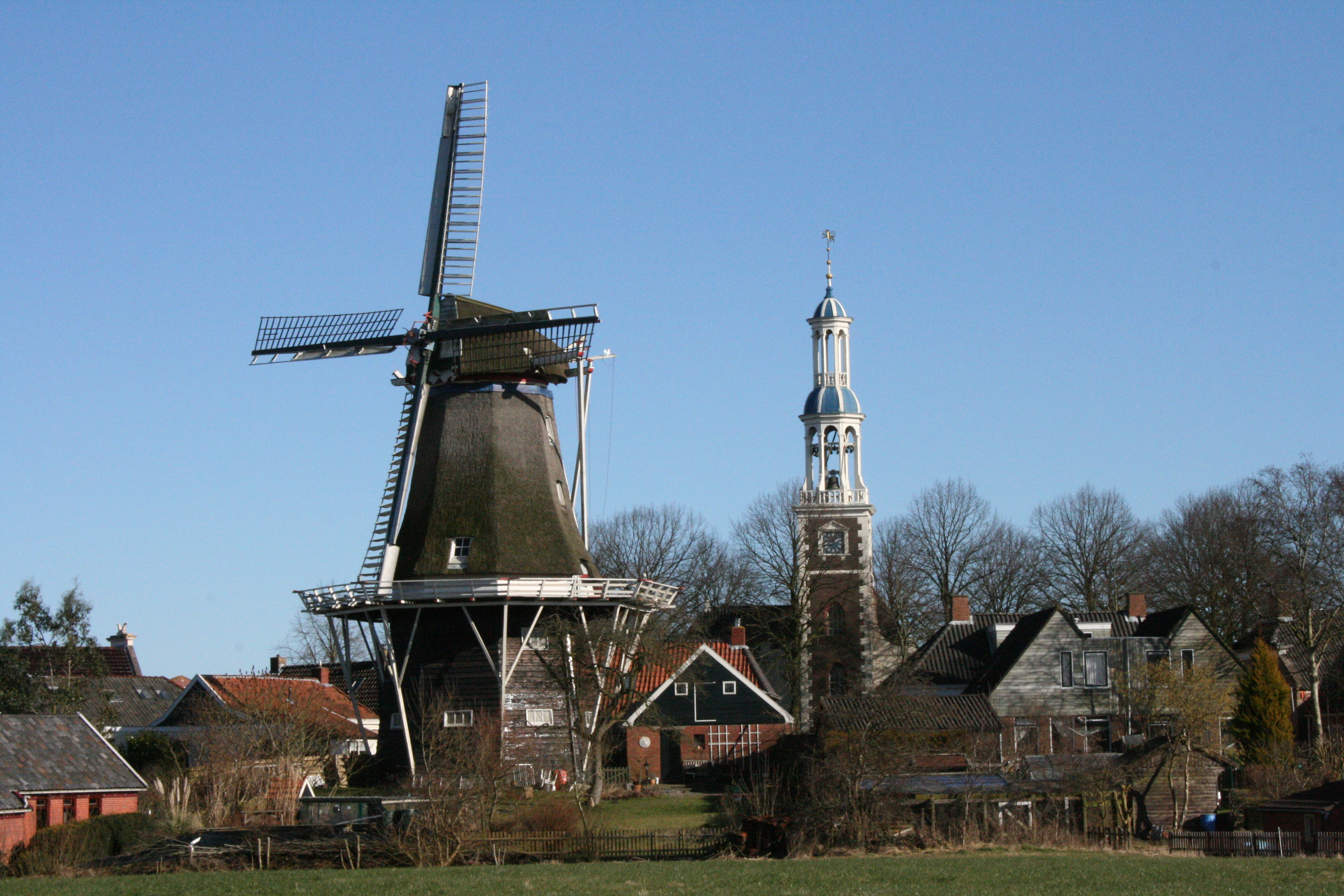
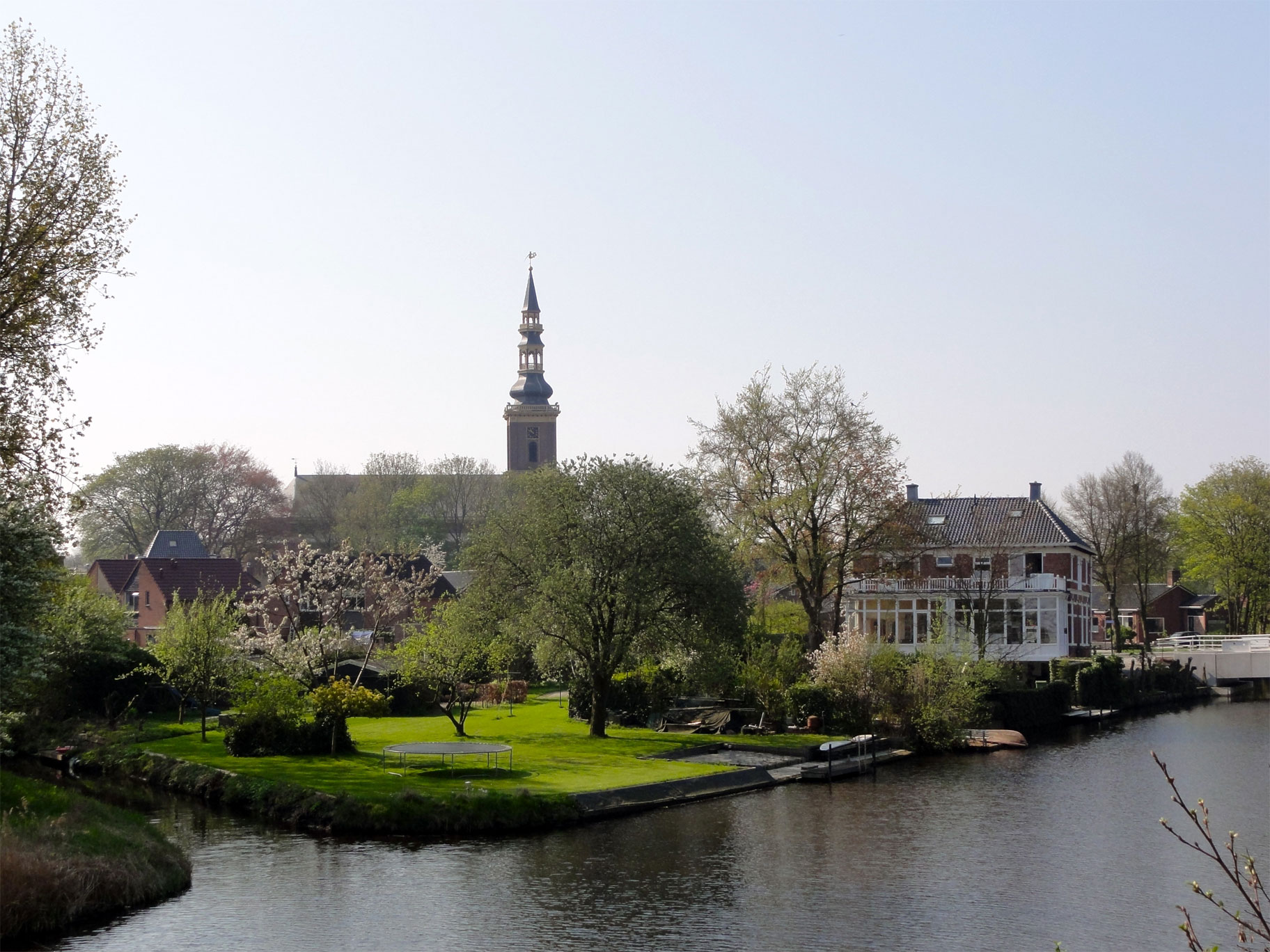
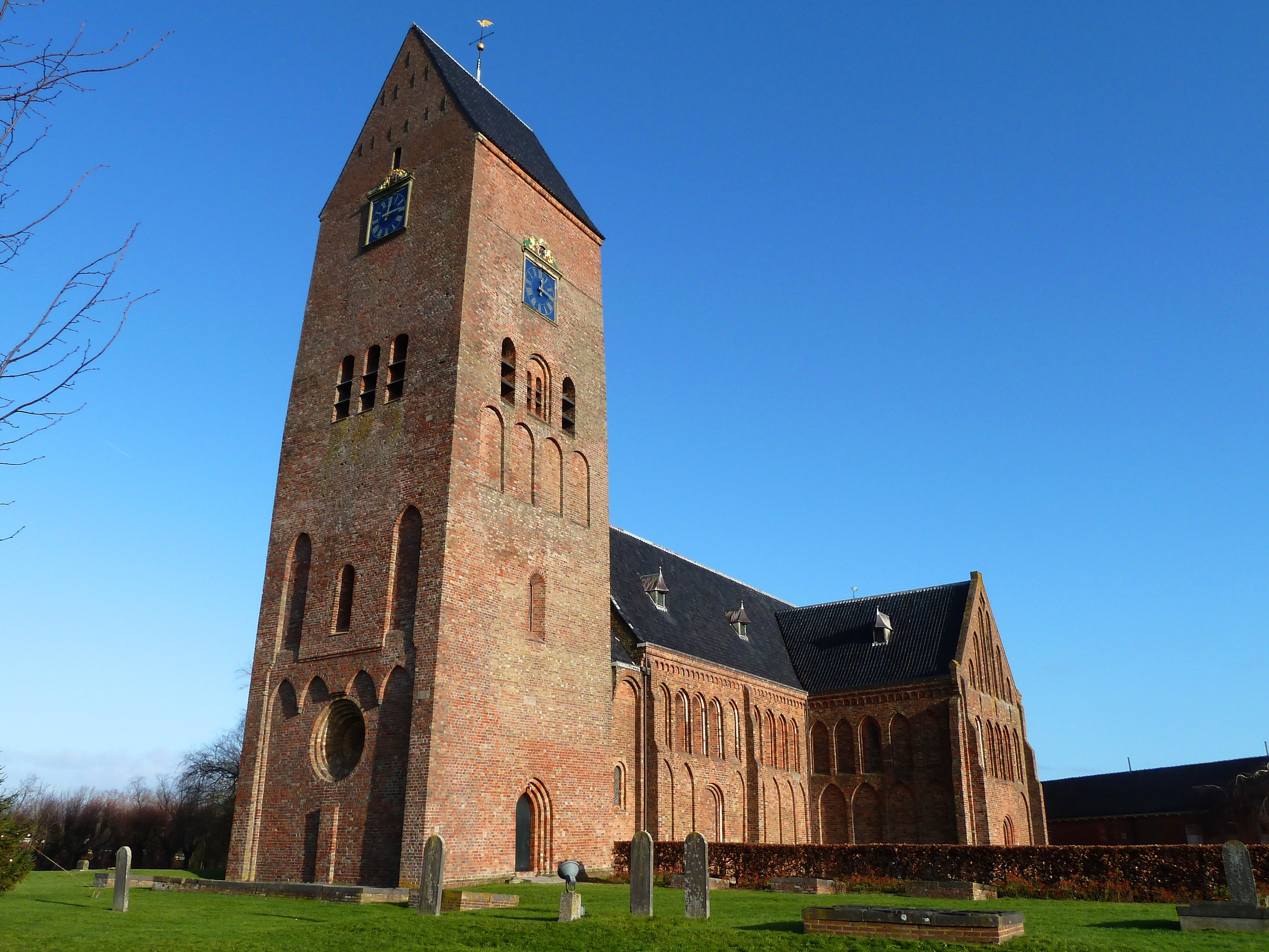
- Delfzijl Appingedam Loppersum Middelstum Wagenborgen Spijk Farmsum Stedum

- Flag Coat of arms

- Location in Groningen
- Country: Netherlands
- Province: Groningen

Government
  - Body: Municipal council
  - Mayor: Ben Visser (Christian Union)

Area
  - Total: 364 km^{2} (141 sq mi)
  - Water: 96.2 km^{2} (37.1 sq mi)
- Time zone: UTC+1 (CET)
  - Summer (DST): UTC+2 (CEST)
- Website: eemsdelta.nl

Eemsdelta (Dutch pronunciation: [ˈeːmzˌdɛltaː]) is a municipality in the province of Groningen, Netherlands formed from the merger of Appingedam, Delfzijl and Loppersum. The municipality came into existence on 1 January 2021.

== Geography ==
As of 2020, the areas encompassed by the municipality have a population of approximately 46 thousand people. The municipality is bordered by Het Hogeland to the west, Groningen to the southwest, Midden-Groningen to the south and Oldambt to the southeast. It consists of 32 main population centres, the largest of which are Appingedam (part of the Appingedam municipality), Delfzijl, Wagenborgen, Spijk (all part of the Delfzijl municipality), Loppersum and Middelstum (both part of the Loppersum municipality).

== Topography ==

Dutch topographic map of the municipality of Eemsdelta, 2021.

== History ==
In 2010, the municipalities of Delfzijl, Eemsmond, Appingedam and Loppersum formed Werkorganisatie DEAL, a joint organisation for handling various municipal tasks. Delfzijl, Appingedam and Loppersum formally announced their interest in a merger on 16 November 2017 and approved the final plans on 2 January 2018. Eemsmond was excluded from the plans as it decided to merge with Bedum, De Marne and Winsum instead to form the municipality of Het Hogeland. In 2019, the planned dissolution of WO DEAL was announced as the municipalities of Het Hogeland and Eemsdelta were deemed to be large enough to be able to handle all their tasks without the need for further cooperation. The Eemsdelta plans were officially approved by the House of Representatives on 22 April 2020, and the Senate on 7 July 2020, with the plans set to come into effect on 1 January 2021.

== Name ==
The name of the municipality was chosen by a vote. Following nearly 800 submissions, a special committee selected their top three options based on recognisability, history, and geographic considerations. The following three options were chosen by the committee: Eemsdelta, Fivelgo and Marenland. Afterwards, the residents of the municipalities were allowed to vote on their preferred choice. Over 16 thousand votes were cast (representing a turnout of 42%), with Eemsdelta receiving an overwhelming majority of the votes (67%). The name refers to the river Eems, and has also previously been used as a loosely defined region in the Northeast of Groningen, roughly encompassing the same territory as the municipality and historically known as Fivelingo or Fivelgo. The name Eemsdelta was received with surprise by some of the inhabitants, since the area surrounding the river mouth of the Ems is not a river delta.

== Politics ==
The first elections for the municipality were held on 18 November 2020. The election was won by Local Interest Eemsdelta (Lokaal Belang Eemsdelta) who received 31.9% of the votes (11 seats), followed by PvdA with 15.9% (5 seats), ChristenUnie with 11.0%, VVD with 10.5%, CDA with 10.1% (3 seats each), Municipal Interests Eemsdelta (Gemeentebelangen Eemsdelta) with 8.1% and GroenLinks with 5.8% (2 seats each), while the Seniors Party Eemsdelta (Seniorenpartij Eemsdelta), the Youth Party Eemsdelta (Jongerenpartij Eemsdelta) and D66 failed to get a seat.
