= Martin Zijlstra =

Dutch politician

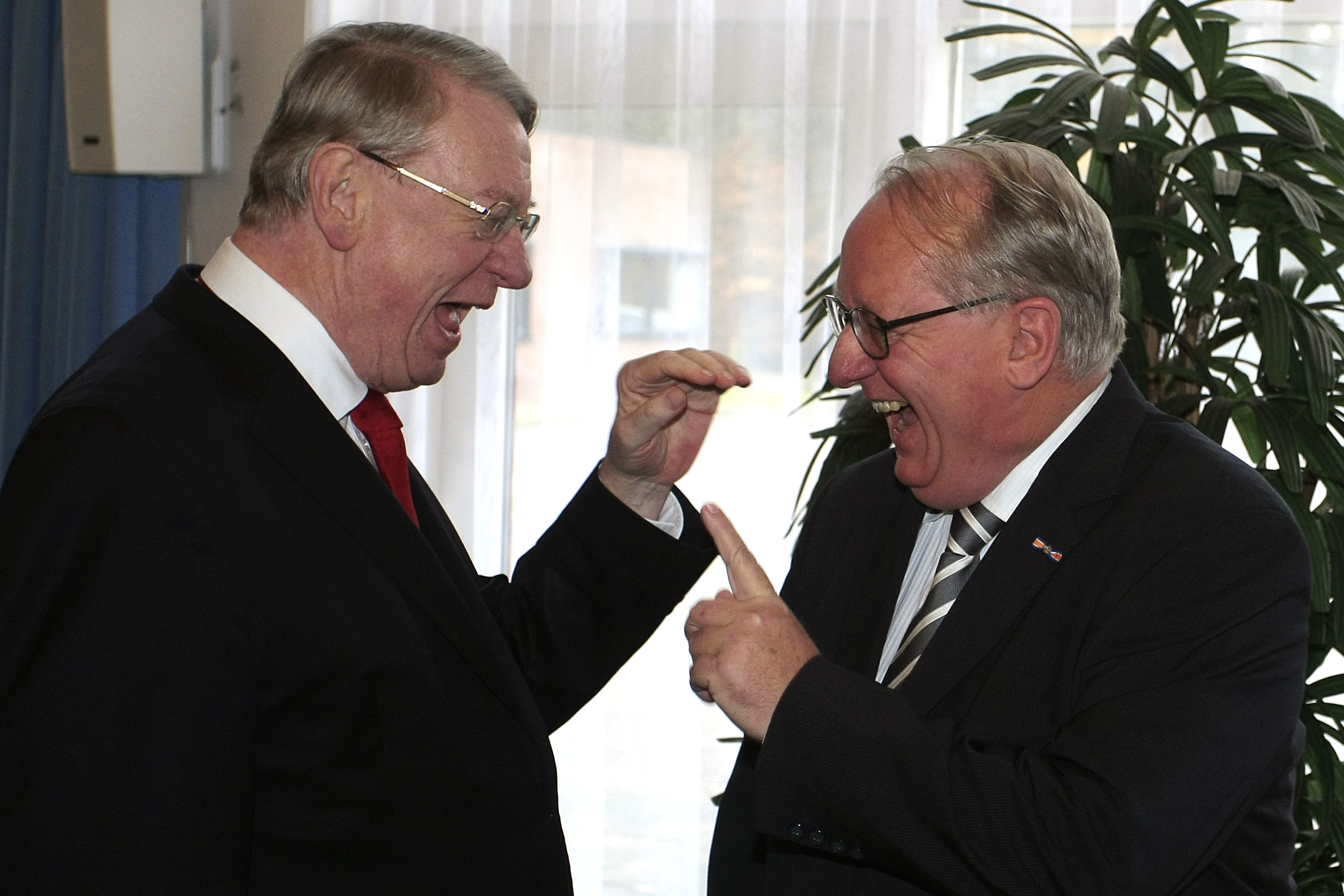
- Hans Hillen (left) together with Martin Zijlsta

Member of the States of Groningen
- In office 5 June 1974 – 7 June 1978

Mayor of Termunten
- In office 16 June 1977 – 1 January 1990

Member of the House of Representatives
- In office 16 November 1989 – 23 May 2002

Member of the municipal council of Delfzijl
- In office 14 March 2002 – 21 April 2002

(Acting) Mayor of Oldambt
- In office 1 January 2010 – 1 September 2010
- Preceded by: None (new municipality)
- Succeeded by: Pieter Smit

(Acting) Mayor of Schiermonnikoog
- In office 1 April 2011 – 26 January 2012

Personal details
- Born: 22 July 1944 Eenrum, Netherlands
- Died: 10 December 2014 (aged 70) Woldendorp, Netherlands
- Party: Labour Party
- Education: University of Groningen

Marten "Martin" Zijlstra (22 July 1944 – 10 December 2014) was a Dutch politician. He started his political career as member of the States of Groningen, serving between 1974 and 1978. Starting in 1977 he served as Mayor of Termunten for thirteen years. He was a member of the House of Representatives of the Netherlands between 1989 and 2002 for the Labour Party and focused on interior affairs and defence policy. After his time as Representative he served two stints as acting mayor in Oldambt and Schiermonnikoog.

== Career ==
Zijlstra was born in Eenrum. He received his primary and secondary education in the village and then studied further at the Hogere Burgerschool in the city of Groningen. He served as non-commissioned officer at the Meteorological Service of the Royal Netherlands Air Force between 1961 and 1968. After his time with the armed forces he studied Dutch law at the University of Groningen between 1969 and 1977. While he was studying he worked at Akzo Zout Chemie between 1968 and 1973. Afterwards he worked four years at the municipality of Delfzijl.

Zijlstra started his political career as member of the States of Groningen and was elected for one four-year term in 1974. During his time in office he became mayor of Termunten in 1977, a position which he would hold for thirteen years, until the municipality merged in 1990. In the 1989 general elections he was elected to the House of Representatives for the Labour Party. During his time as Representative he dealt mostly with interior affairs and defence policy, focusing on employment and veteran affairs. He served until 23 May 2002. In the same year he left the House of Representatives he served for one month in the municipal council of Delfzijl.

In 2010 he was acting mayor of Oldambt between 1 January and 1 September after the municipality had been formed due to a merger, he was succeeded by Pieter Smit who became the first regular mayor of Oldambt. And in 2011–2012 he served several months as mayor of Schiermonnikoog after the previous mayor stepped down.

Apart from his political career he also served in numerous boards of foundations and groups, including broadcaster RTV Noord for six years. Zijlstra was also chairman of the Veteraneninstituut, the Dutch institute for military veterans, between March 2003 and February 2011. He was characterized as a real inhabitant of the province of Groningen.

He was invested as a Knight of the Order of Orange-Nassau on 22 May 2002.

He died on 10 December 2014 in Woldendorp after a long illness.
