= Termunterzijl =

- Village
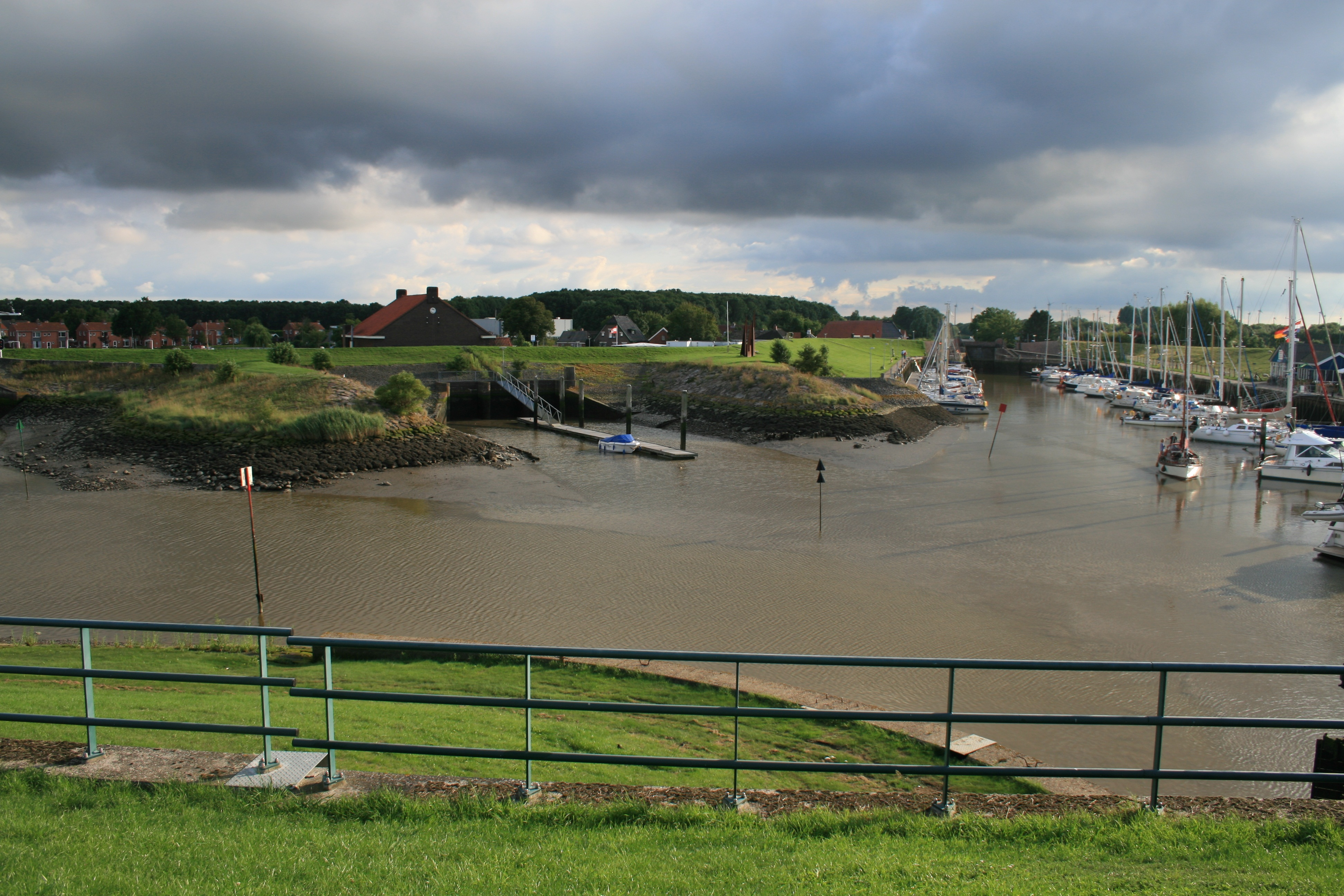
- Termunterzijl in 2010

- Location in the province of Groningen in the Netherlands Termunterzijl (Netherlands)
- Coordinates: 53°18′N 7°2′E
- Country: Netherlands
- Province: Groningen
- Municipality: Eemsdelta

Area
  - Total: 0.33 km^{2} (0.13 sq mi)
- Elevation: 0.9 m (3.0 ft)

Population (2021)
  - Total: 295
  - Density: 890/km^{2} (2,300/sq mi)
- Time zone: UTC+1 (CET)
  - Summer (DST): UTC+2 (CEST)
- Postal code: 9948
- Dialing code: 0596

Termunterzijl (Dutch pronunciation: [tɛrˈmʏntərˌzɛil]; Gronings: Ziel [ˈzil]) is a village in the Dutch province of Groningen. It is a part of the municipality of Eemsdelta, and lies about 32 km east of Groningen.

== History ==
The village was first mentioned in 1660 as "Zijl Ter Munte", and means "sluice near Termunten".

Around 1300, the former river Munte was dammed and a sluice was installed. The village of Termunterzijl developed around the sluice. The sluice was destroyed in 1686 by a flood, and the village was destroyed in a flood in 1717. In 1728, the current sluice was built by the city of Groningen.

In 1601, a ferry service opened to Emden in East-Frisia, Germany. The harbour near the sluice grew in importance as well, and was used by ships to Norway, German, Russia and England.

Termunterzijl was home to 340 people in 1840. In 1870, a new (outer) sluice was added to relieve the old (inner) sluice. The new sluice was replaced by a sluice which is an integral part of the sea dike in 1972. In the early 20th century, the harbour became overshadowed by neighbouring Delfzijl and Termunterzijl started to become a fishing village. Between 1930 and 1931, a large pumping station was installed near the old sluice.

== Gallery ==
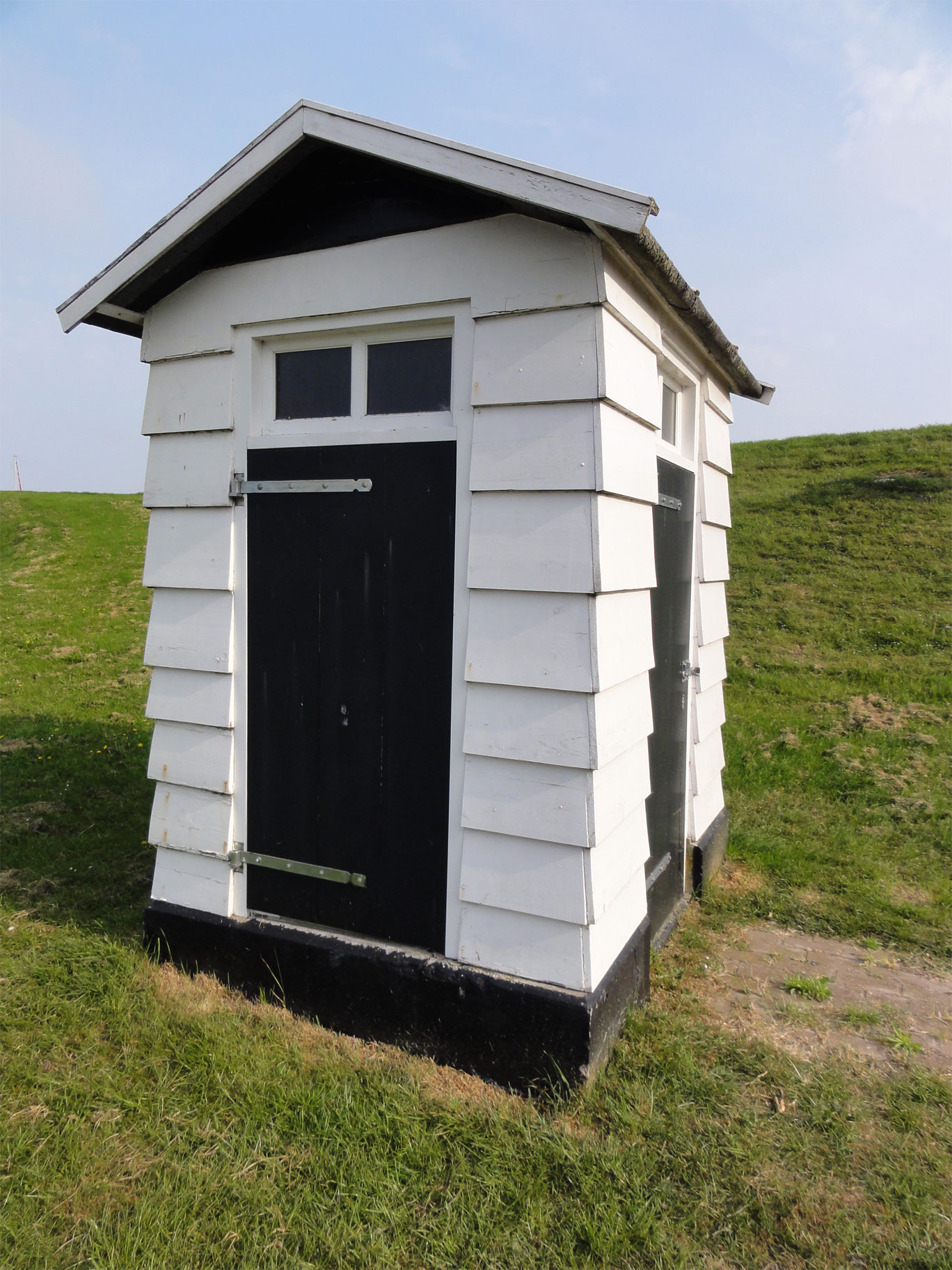
Toll house Termunterzijl

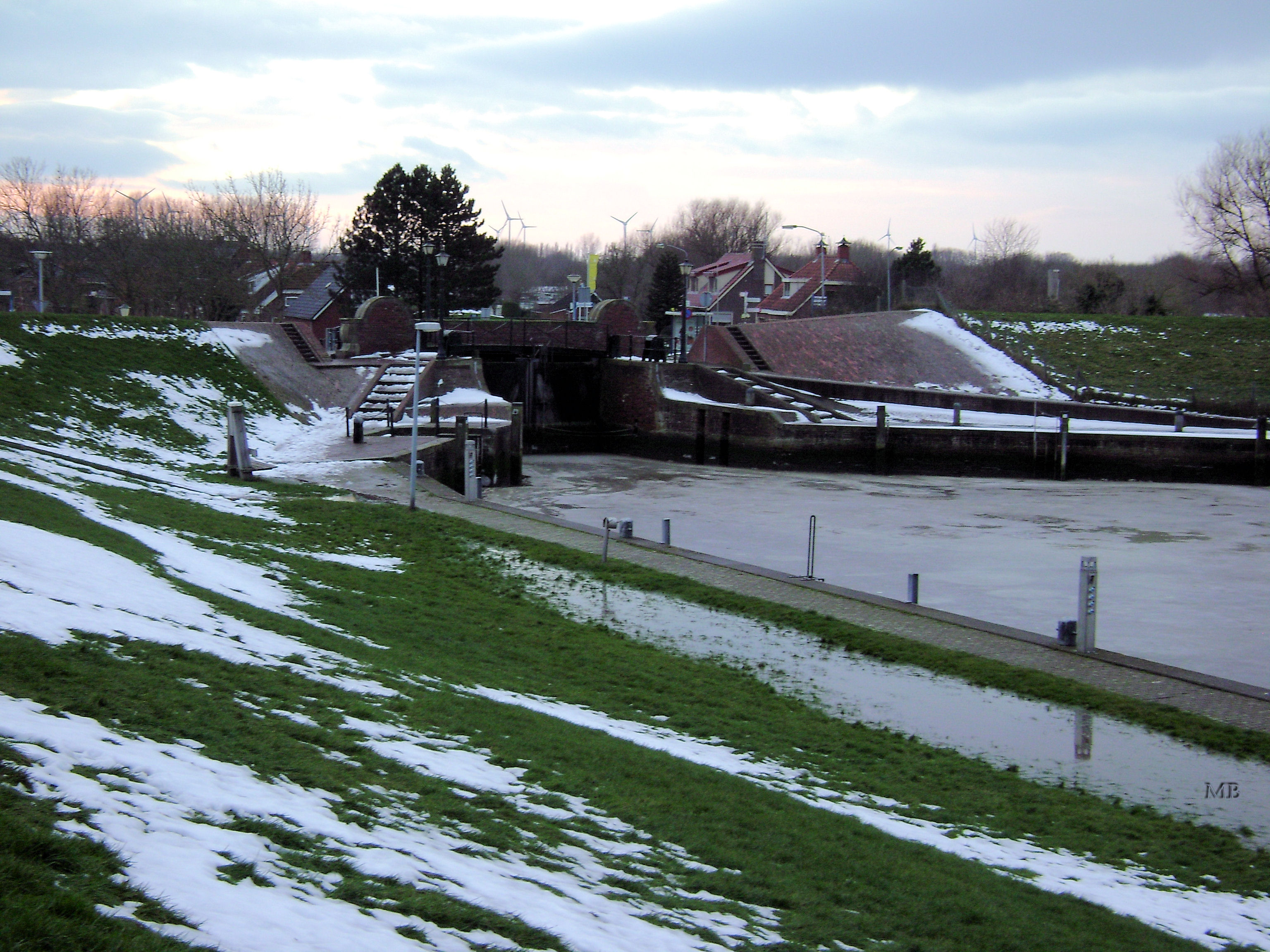
Inner sluice

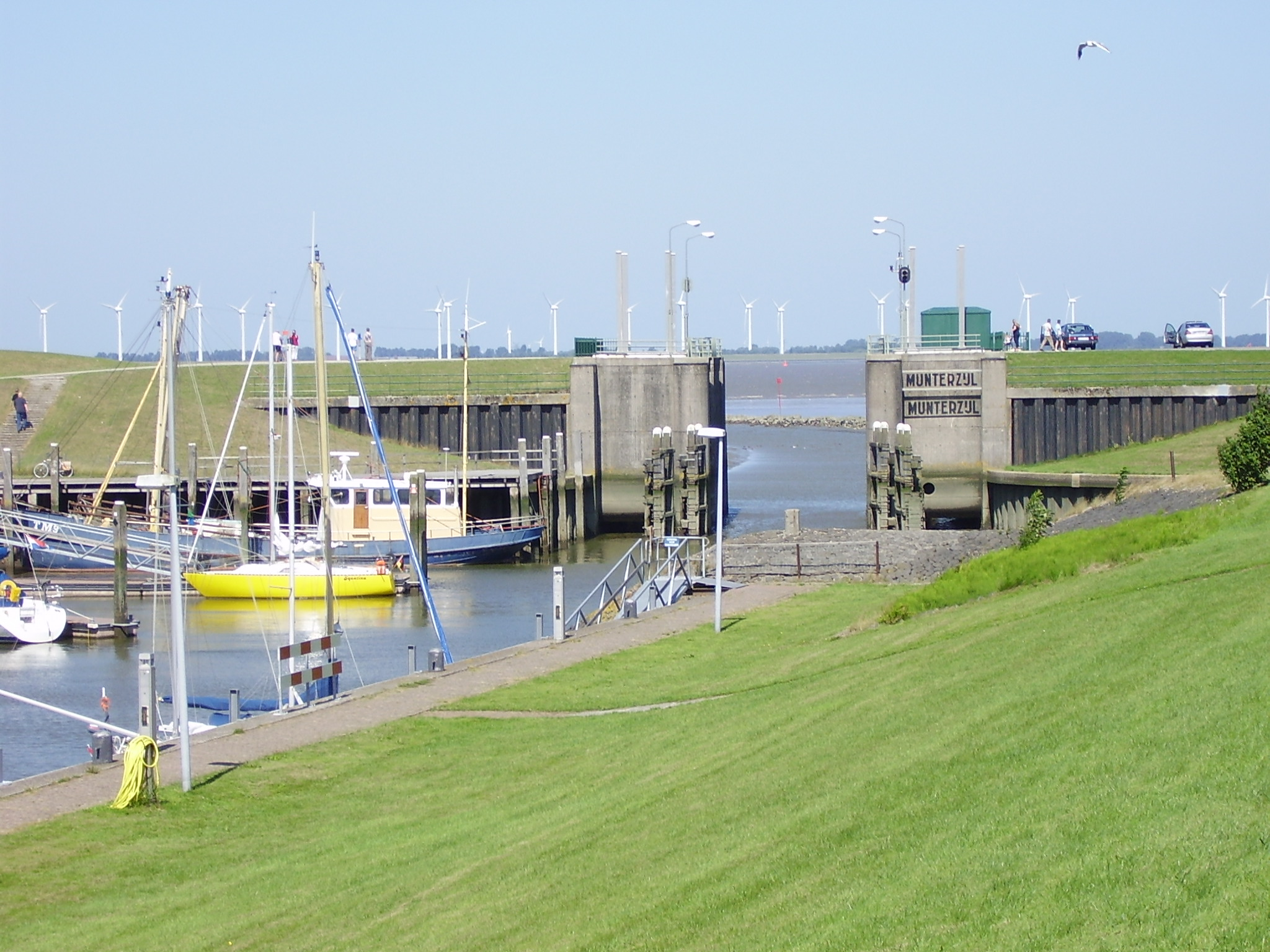
Harbour at Termunterzijl

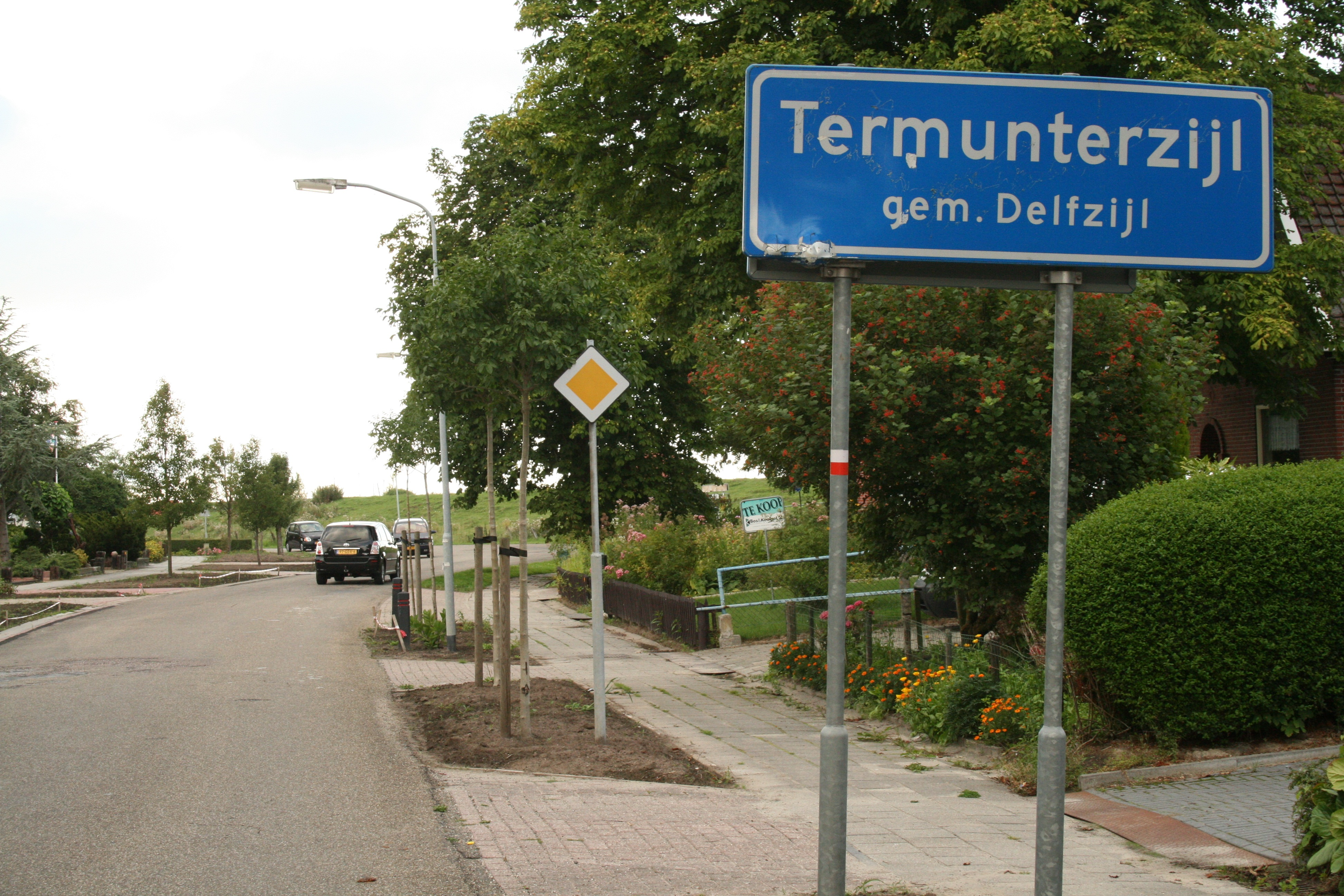
Welcome to Termunterzijl
