= Huizinge =

- Village
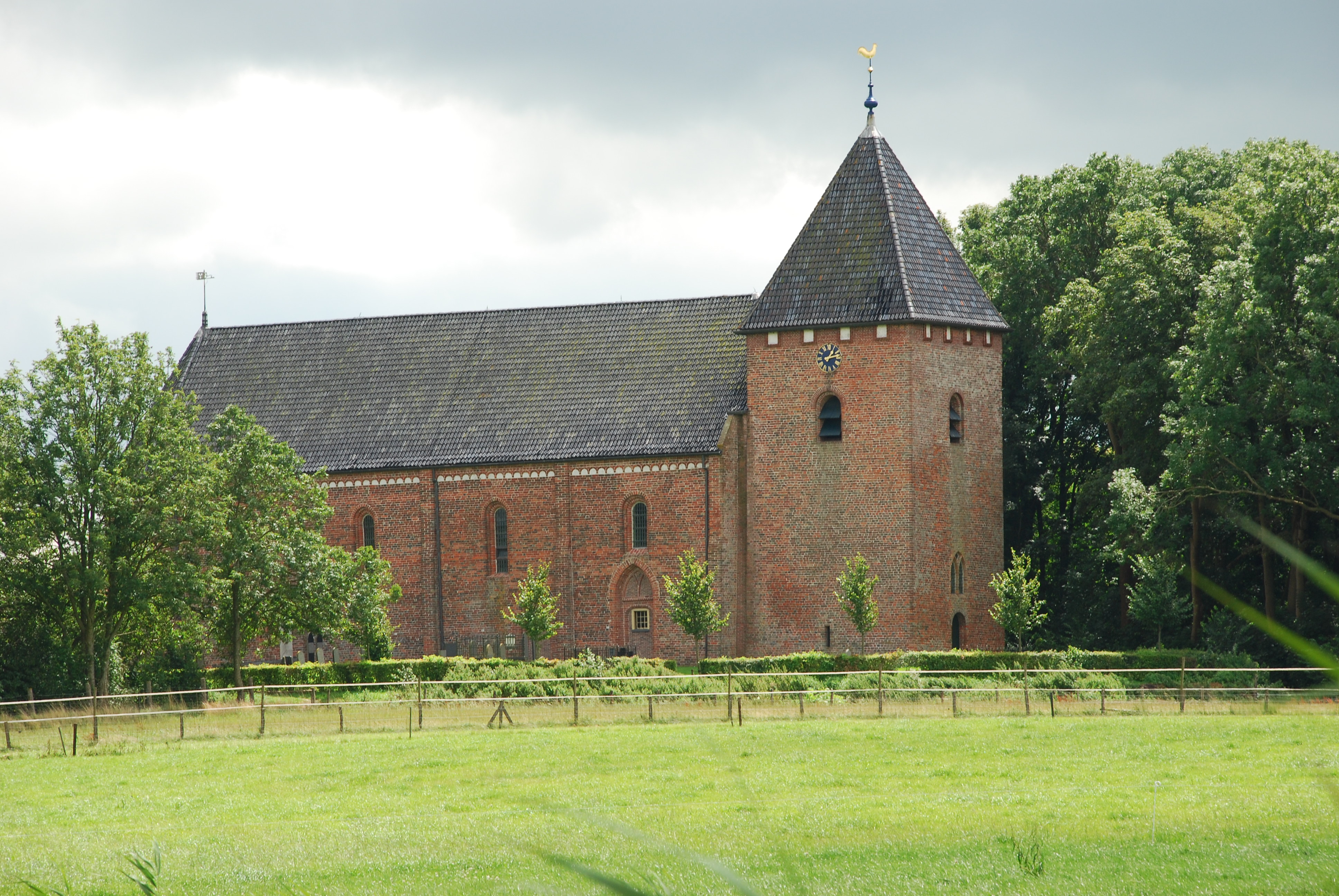
- Church of Huizinge in 2007

- Location in the province of Groningen in the Netherlands Huizinge (Netherlands)
- Coordinates: 53°21′N 6°40′E
- Country: Netherlands
- Province: Groningen
- Municipality: Eemsdelta

Area
  - Total: 0.15 km^{2} (0.058 sq mi)
- Elevation: 1.2 m (3.9 ft)

Population (2021)
  - Total: 105
  - Density: 700/km^{2} (1,800/sq mi)
- Time zone: UTC+1 (CET)
  - Summer (DST): UTC+2 (CEST)
- Postal code: 9992
- Dialing code: 0595

Huizinge (Dutch pronunciation: [ˈɦœyzɪŋə]; Gronings: Hoezen [ˈɦuːzn̩]) is a village with a population of 100 in the municipality of Eemsdelta in the province of Groningen in the northeast of the Netherlands.

On 16 August 2012, the heaviest induced earthquake in the Netherlands with a magnitude of 3.6 occurred with its epicentre in Huizinge.

== History ==
The village was first mentioned between 822 and 856 as "in Hustinga". The etymology is unclear. Huizinge is a terp (artificial living hill) village with a grid like structure. Part of the terp was later excavated.

The Dutch Reformed church dates from the 13th century. The 14th-century tower was enlarged in 1847, but replaced again in 1868 by the current tower, because the structure leaked and the wood started to rot.

Huizinge was home to 263 people in 1840.

== Gallery ==
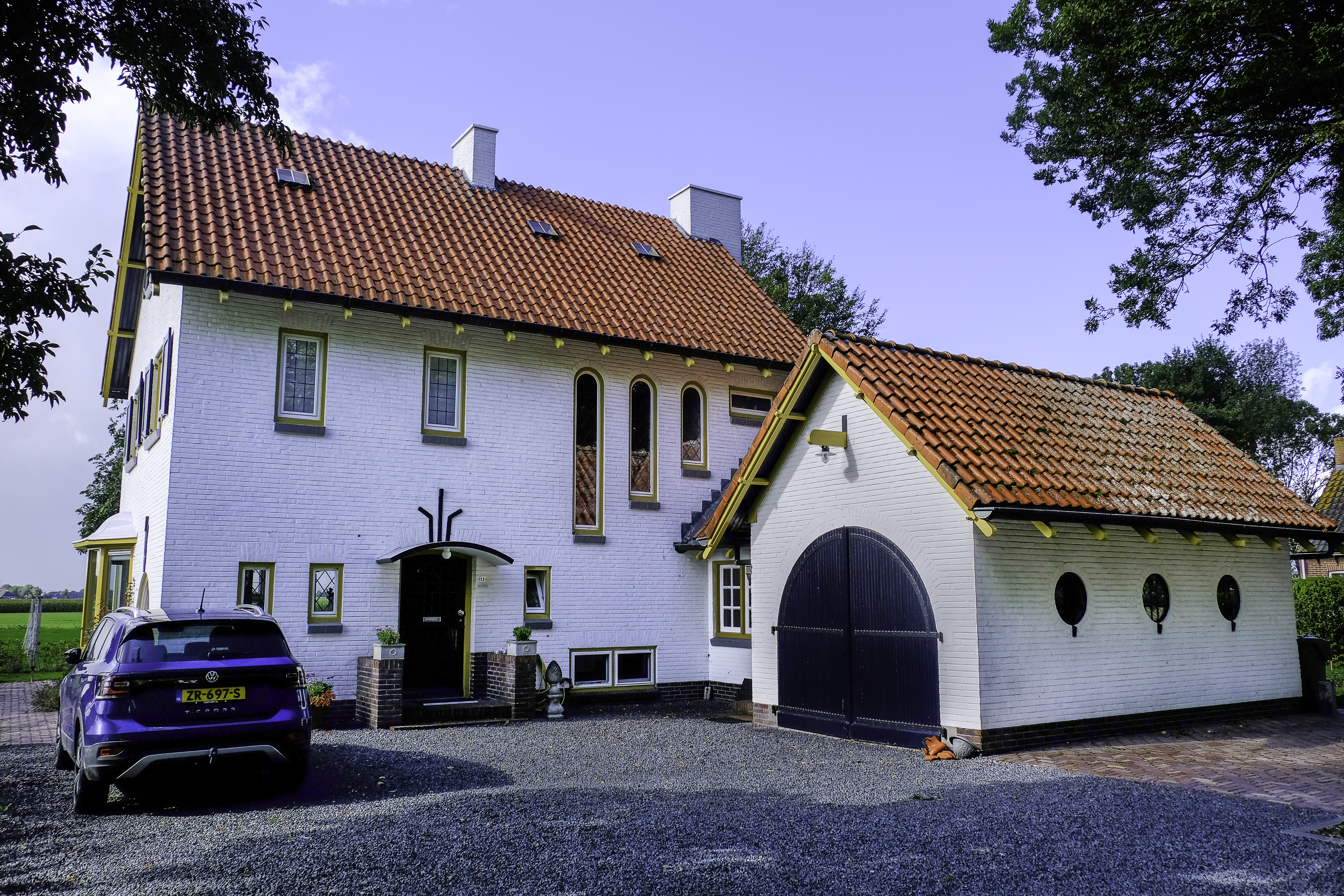
Former clergy house

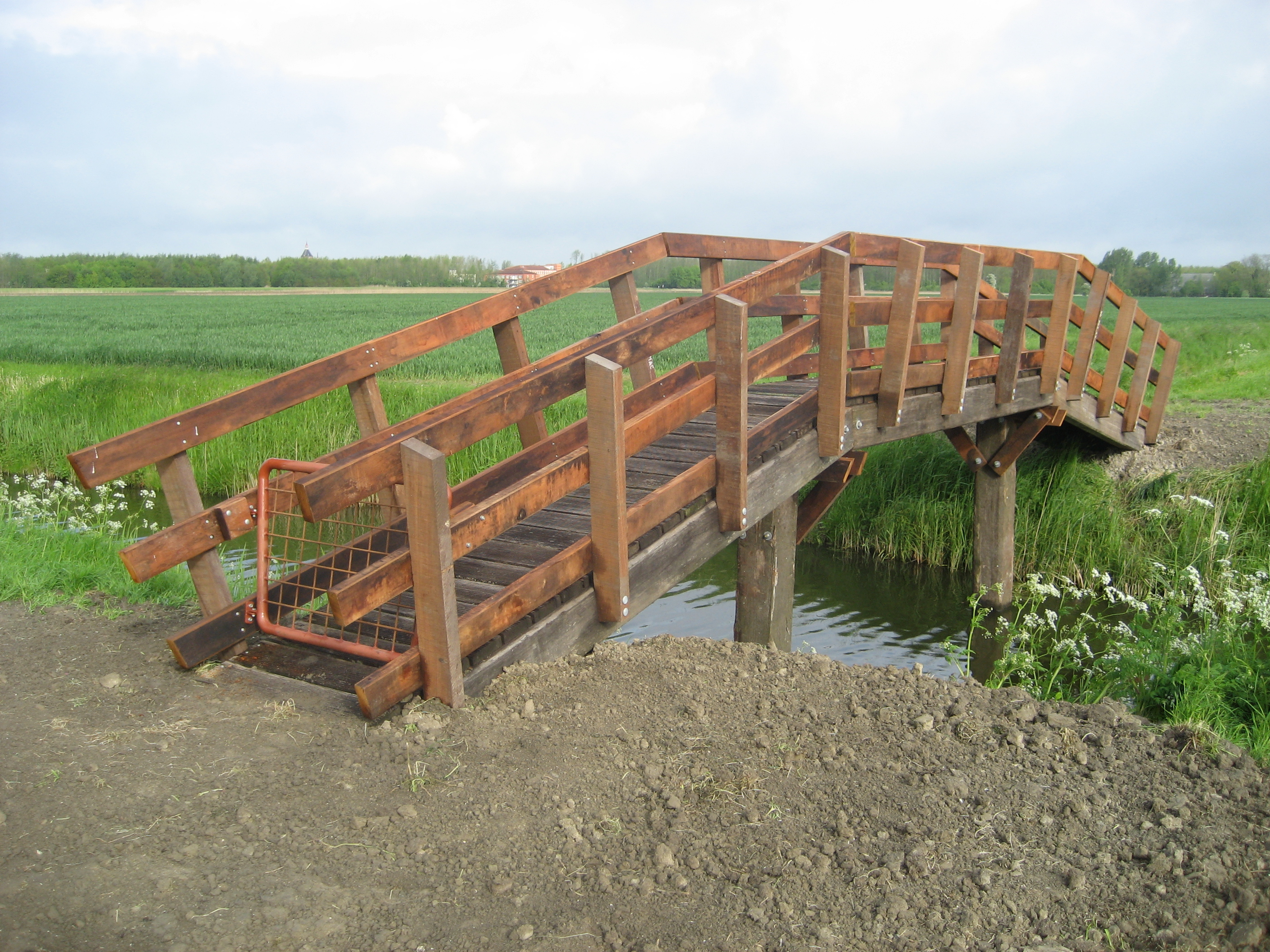
Bridge over the Huizingen Maar

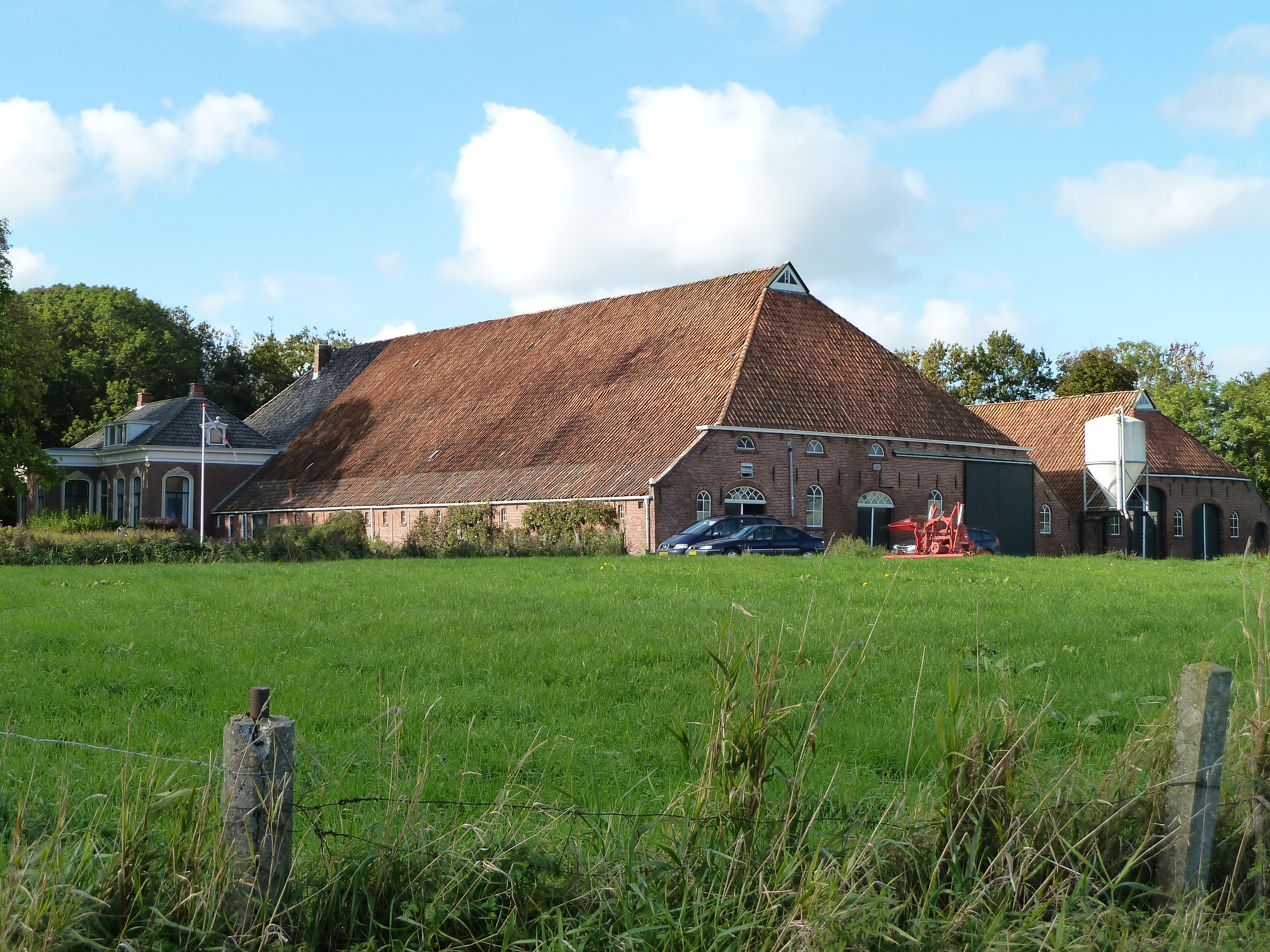
Farm in Huizinge

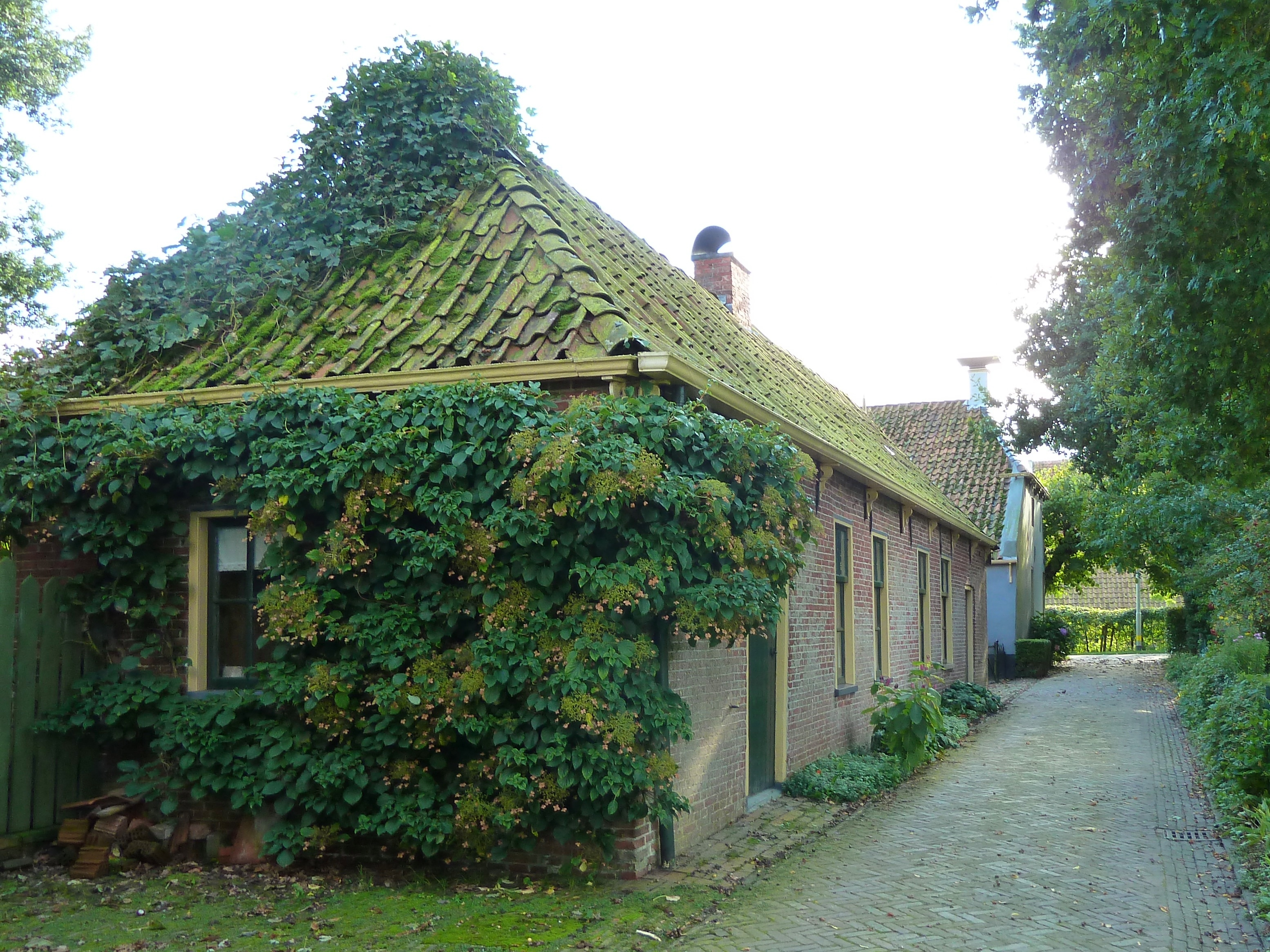
Former horse stables

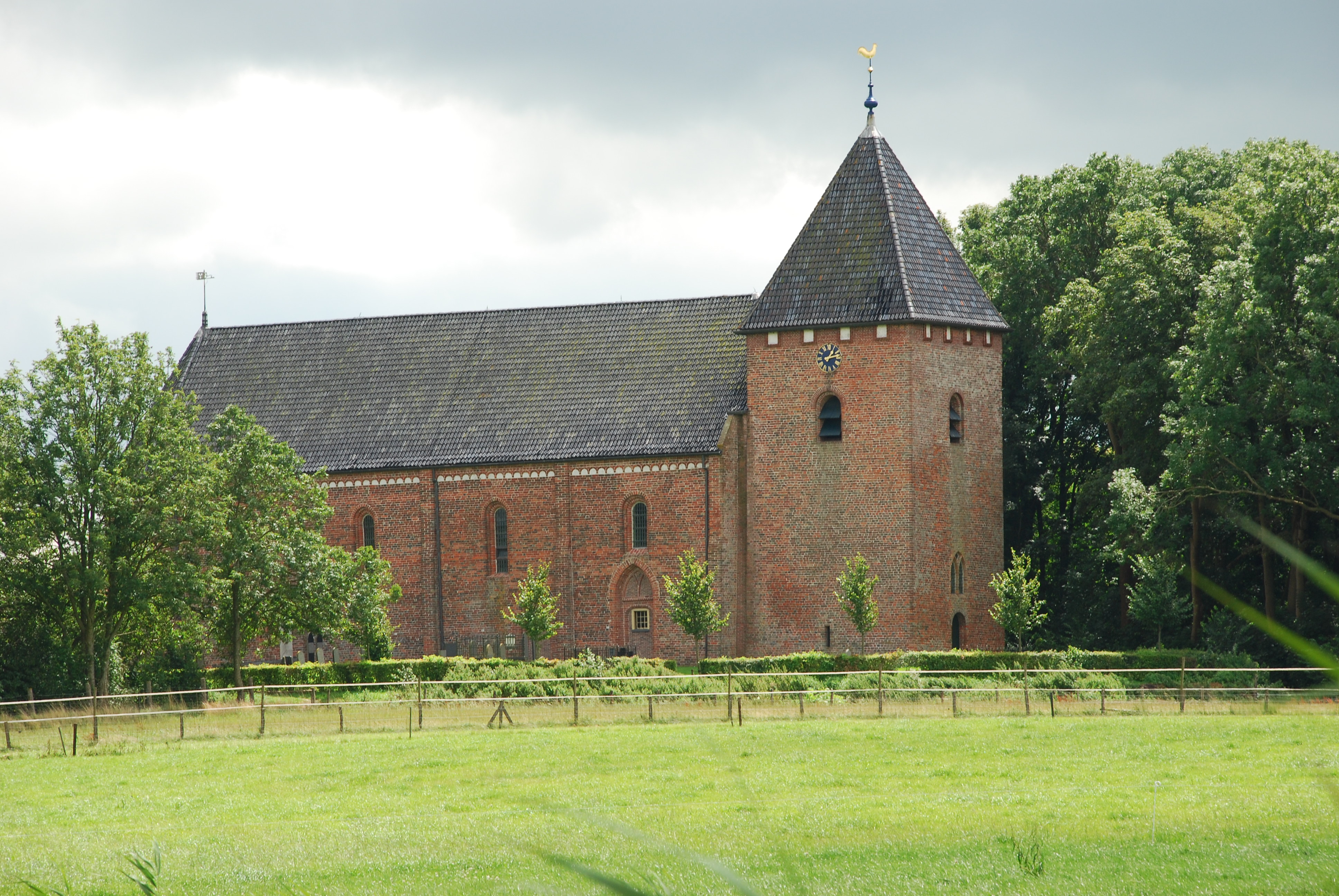
Huizinge Church

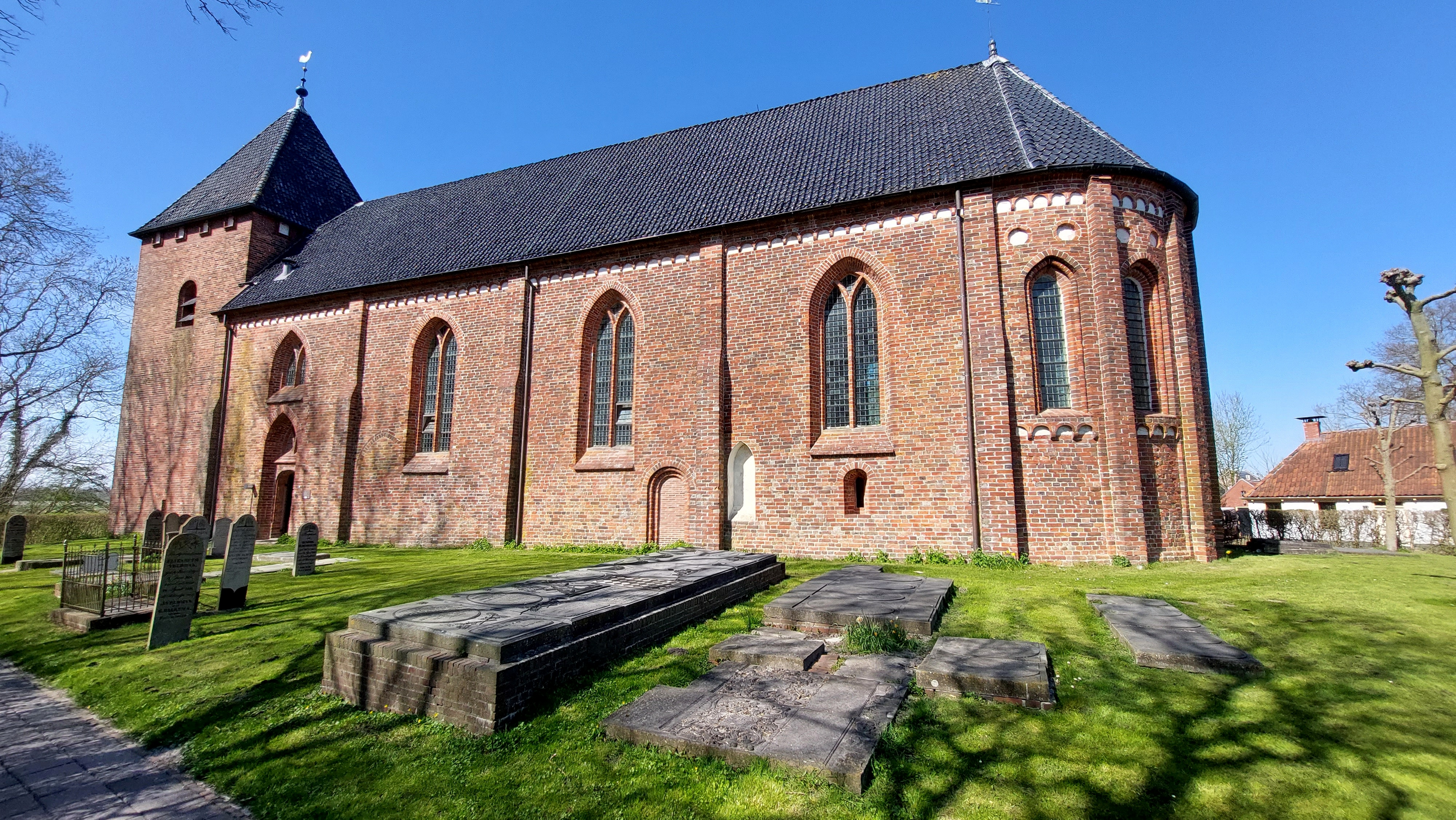
Huizinge, Jehannes de Dopertsjerke
