= Woldendorp =

- Village
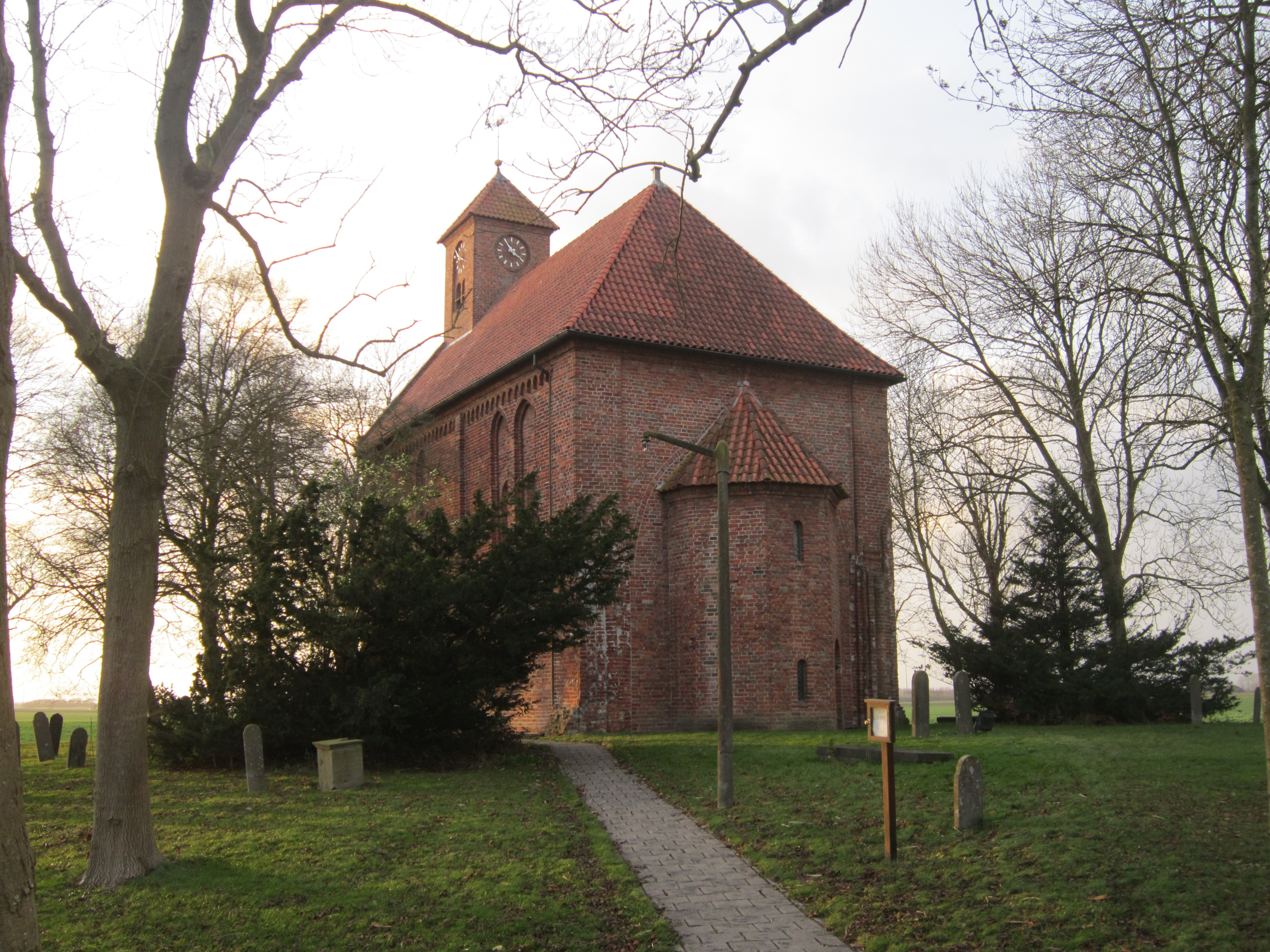
- Church in 2012

- Location in the province of Groningen in the Netherlands Woldendorp (Netherlands)
- Coordinates: 53°16′23″N 7°1′46″E
- Country: Netherlands
- Province: Groningen
- Municipality: Eemsdelta

Area
  - Total: 0.65 km^{2} (0.25 sq mi)
- Elevation: 0.9 m (3.0 ft)

Population (2021)
  - Total: 890
  - Density: 1,400/km^{2} (3,500/sq mi)
- Time zone: UTC+1 (CET)
  - Summer (DST): UTC+2 (CEST)
- Postal code: 9946
- Dialing code: 0596

Woldendorp (Dutch pronunciation: [ˈʋɔldə(n)ˌdɔr(ə)p]) is a village in the Dutch province of Groningen. It is a part of the municipality of Eemsdelta, and lies about 31 km east of Groningen.

== History ==
The village was first mentioned in 1399 as Waldmonathorp, and means "village of the men from the woods". Woldendorp is a terp (artificial living hill) with a radial structure dating from the Early Middle Ages.

The nave of the Dutch Reformed church dates from the late-13th century. The church was extended before the 17th century, and heavily damaged by war in 1945. It was restored between 1949 and 1955.

Woldendorp was home to 350 people in 1840. In April 1945, Woldendorp was largely destroyed during the fighting in the Delfzijl pocket. The Reformed Church dated from 1949. It was decommissioned and sold in 2006 to be transformed into a music theatre. The building could be made earthquake proof and was demolished in 2018.

== Gallery ==
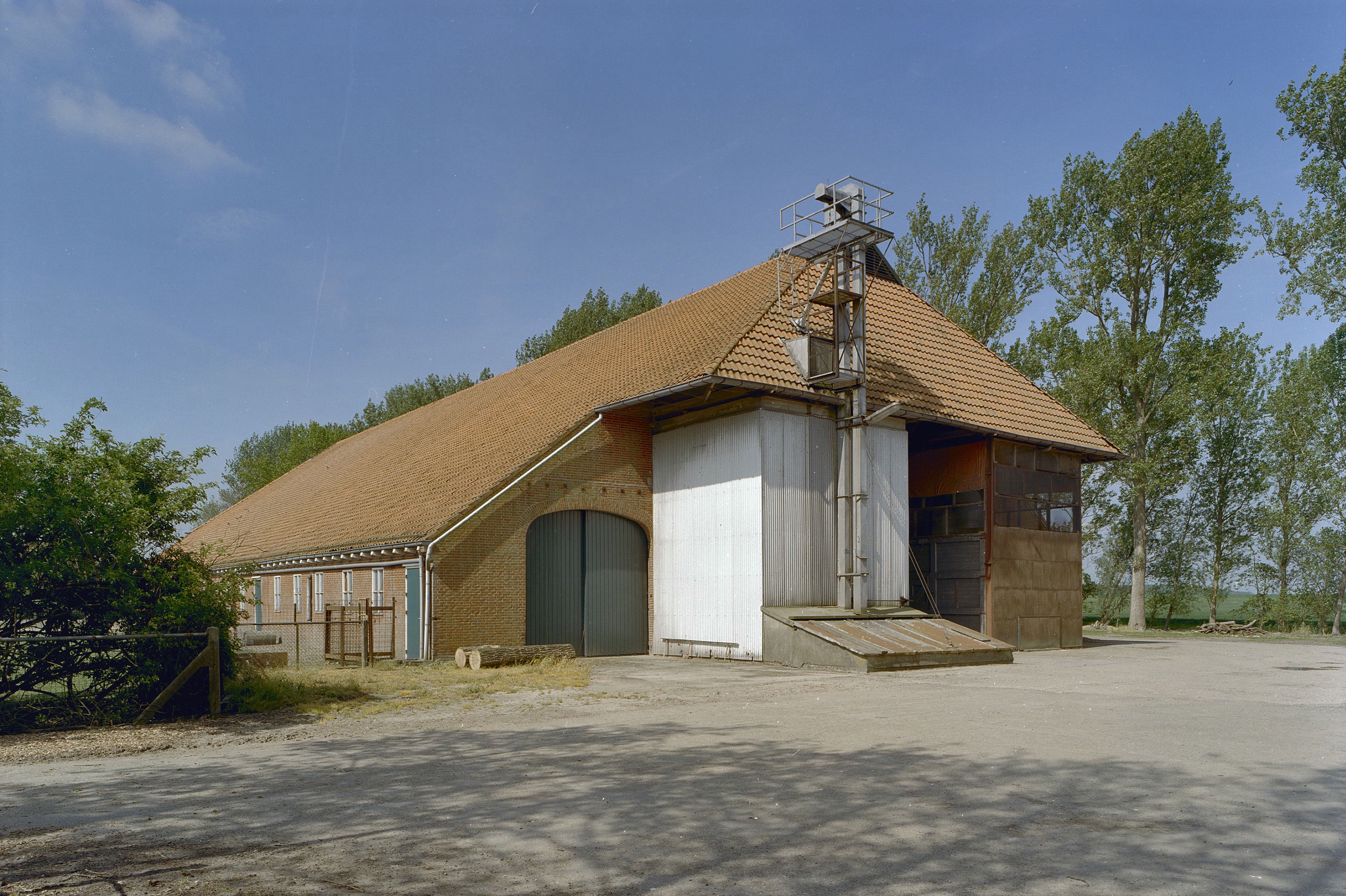
Farm in Woldendorp

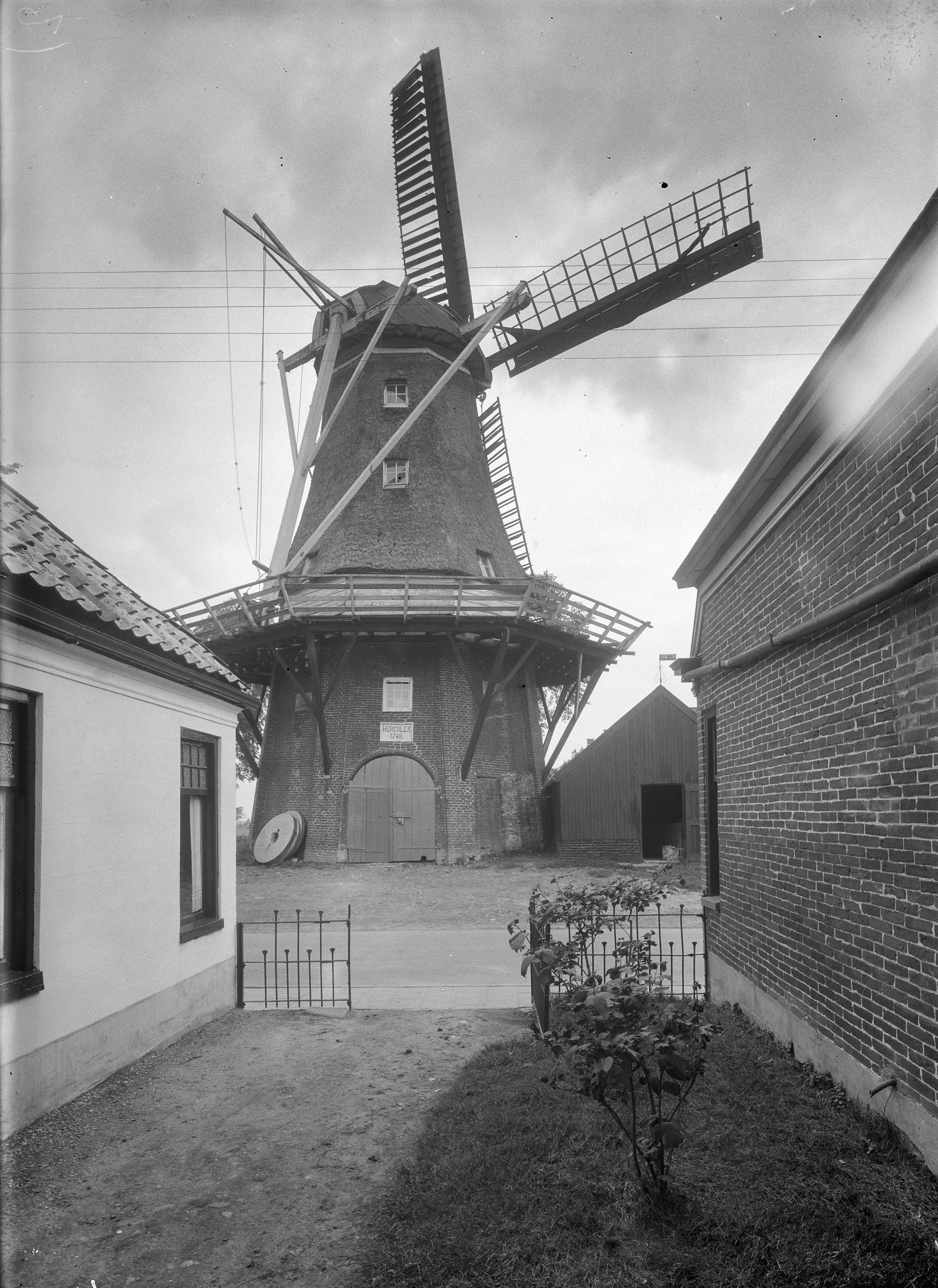
Windmill Hercules
