= 1992 Roermond earthquake =

Strongest recorded earthquake in the Netherlands and in Northwestern Europe

- Location within Netherlands
- UTC time: 1992-04-13 01:20:00
- ISC event: 295572
- USGS-ANSS: ComCat
- Local date: 13 April 1992
- Local time: 03:20:00
- Magnitude: 5.8 M_{L} 5.3 M_{w}
- Depth: 18.0 km (11.2 mi)
- Epicenter: 51.16°N 5.95°E
- Type: Dip-slip
- Areas affected: Netherlands, Germany and Belgium
- Max. intensity: MMI VIII (Severe)
- Casualties: 1 dead, 46 injured

The 1992 Roermond earthquake occurred on 13 April, around 3:20 AM (1:20 UTC) with a moment magnitude of 5.3 and a maximum Mercalli intensity of VIII (Severe). Striking on the Peel Boundary Fault, a normal fault near Roermond, it was the strongest recorded earthquake in the Netherlands and in Northwestern Europe, and caused substantial damage to older buildings in the Netherlands and adjacent countries of Belgium and Germany. A series of aftershocks followed.

== Tectonic setting ==
The city of Roermond lies above the Roer Graben, which forms the southeastern part of the Lower Rhine Graben (or Lower Rhine Embayment). These structures form part of the European Cenozoic Rift System, which formed within the foreland of the Alpine orogeny. The Roer graben formed during the Paleogene and is currently active as shown by the thickening of Quaternary sedimentary rocks into the basin. The graben is bounded by NW-SE trending normal fault systems, with the largest fault being the southwest-dipping Peel Boundary Fault, which displaces the base of the Quaternary sequence by about 175 m. All the major faults show evidence of neotectonics.

== Location ==
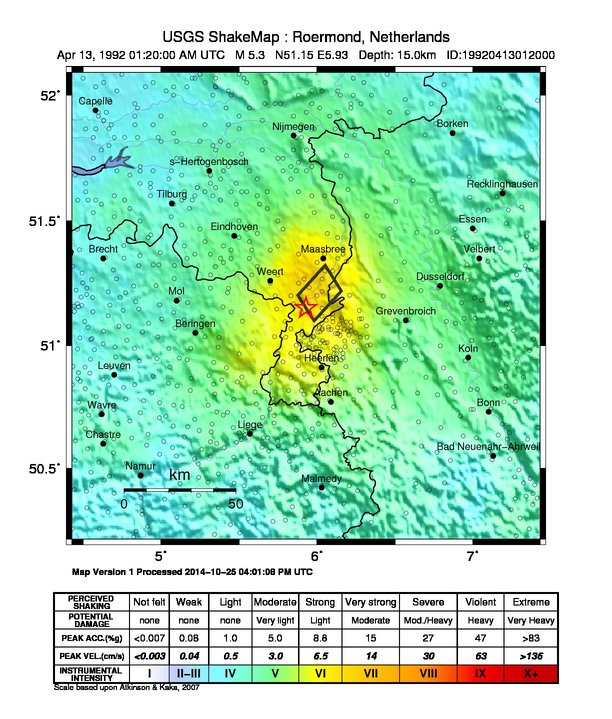
USGS Shakemap for the earthquake

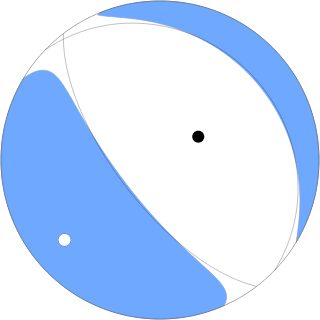
Focal mechanism diagram for the earthquake

The earthquake's focal mechanism showed almost pure normal faulting on a plane dipping southwest at 68°, identified as the Peel Boundary Fault. The epicentre of the earthquake lay kilometers away from the south of Roermond.

== Intensity ==
The earthquake was recorded as 5.8 on the Richter scale (5.3 on the moment magnitude scale) and a maximum intensity of VIII (Severe) on the Mercalli intensity scale.

An intensity of VIII means considerable damage to poorly built structures and heavy furniture is overturned. The earthquake was not evenly spread as some areas were hit harder than others. This earthquake could be felt as far away as the Czech Republic, Switzerland, France and England.

== Damage and casualties ==
In the regions between Roermond, Maaseik (Belgium), and Heinsberg (Germany), buildings, especially old buildings, and cars were destroyed. Two churches in Roermond, the Munsterkerk and Minderbroederskerk, were heavily damaged. The economic cost of the earthquake was estimated to be around 275 million guilders (around 125 million euros), of which 170 million guilders (around 77 million euros) of damage in the Netherlands. A 79-year-old woman died of a heart attack in Bonn.

== Aftershocks ==
The earthquake was followed by more than 200 aftershocks.

== See also ==
- List of earthquakes in the Netherlands
