= List of earthquakes in the Netherlands =

Earthquakes in the Netherlands occur mostly in the southeast and northeast of the country, with mostly tectonic earthquakes in the southeast and induced earthquakes in the northeast. The Royal Netherlands Meteorological Institute started with seismic registrations in 1904. The strongest recorded earthquake was the 1992 Roermond earthquake with a magnitude of 5.8.

== Seismic registration ==
The first time that seismic activity in the Netherlands was registered by the Royal Netherlands Meteorological Institute (KNMI) in De Bilt was on 26 June 1904.

== Tectonic earthquakes ==
The natural earthquakes that occur in the southeast of the Netherlands are caused by active rifts of the European Cenozoic Rift System. The 1992 Roermond earthquake in the southeastern province of Limburg was the strongest registered earthquake in the Netherlands. It had a magnitude of 5.8 and occurred in Roermond on 13 April 1992.

== Induced earthquakes ==
Since 1986, there have been around 1,000 induced earthquakes in the northeast of the Netherlands caused by the exploitation of the Groningen gas field near Slochteren. The heaviest such earthquake, which occurred on 16 August 2013 in Huizinge (in the northeastern province of Groningen), had a magnitude of 3.6. This event count shows a remarkable exponential growth in time, which would possibly lead to one event per day in 2025. While moderate in magnitude, the sheer number of events acts as a physical stressor to living conditions and gives an adverse outlook long term on structural integrity of homes and buildings. On March 29, 2018, the government therefore announced it would shut down the gas extraction on this field entirely by 2030 at the latest. It is projected the normal exploration will end by 2022, while still serving as a reserve for exceptionally cold winters. After peaking in 2013 the number of induced earthquakes with a magnitude > 1,5 has been decreasing. Up to 2016, however, KNMI data up to 2016 reveal an exponential trend in yearly event counts.

== Strongest earthquakes ==
Locations of earthquakes with a magnitude of 4.0 or higher

Since 1904, there were seven earthquakes in the Netherlands with a magnitude of 4.0 or higher. All were noninduced earthquakes in the southeastern provinces of Limburg and North Brabant.

Date	Location	Mag.
31 August 1906	Grathem, Limburg	4.2
20 November 1932	Uden, North Brabant	5.0
23 November 1932	Boxtel, North Brabant	4.5
28 November 1932	Vught, North Brabant	4.5
4 January 1935	Roermond, Limburg	4.3
13 April 1992	Roermond, Limburg	5.8
13 April 1992	Roermond, Limburg	4.0
