= Termunten =

- Village
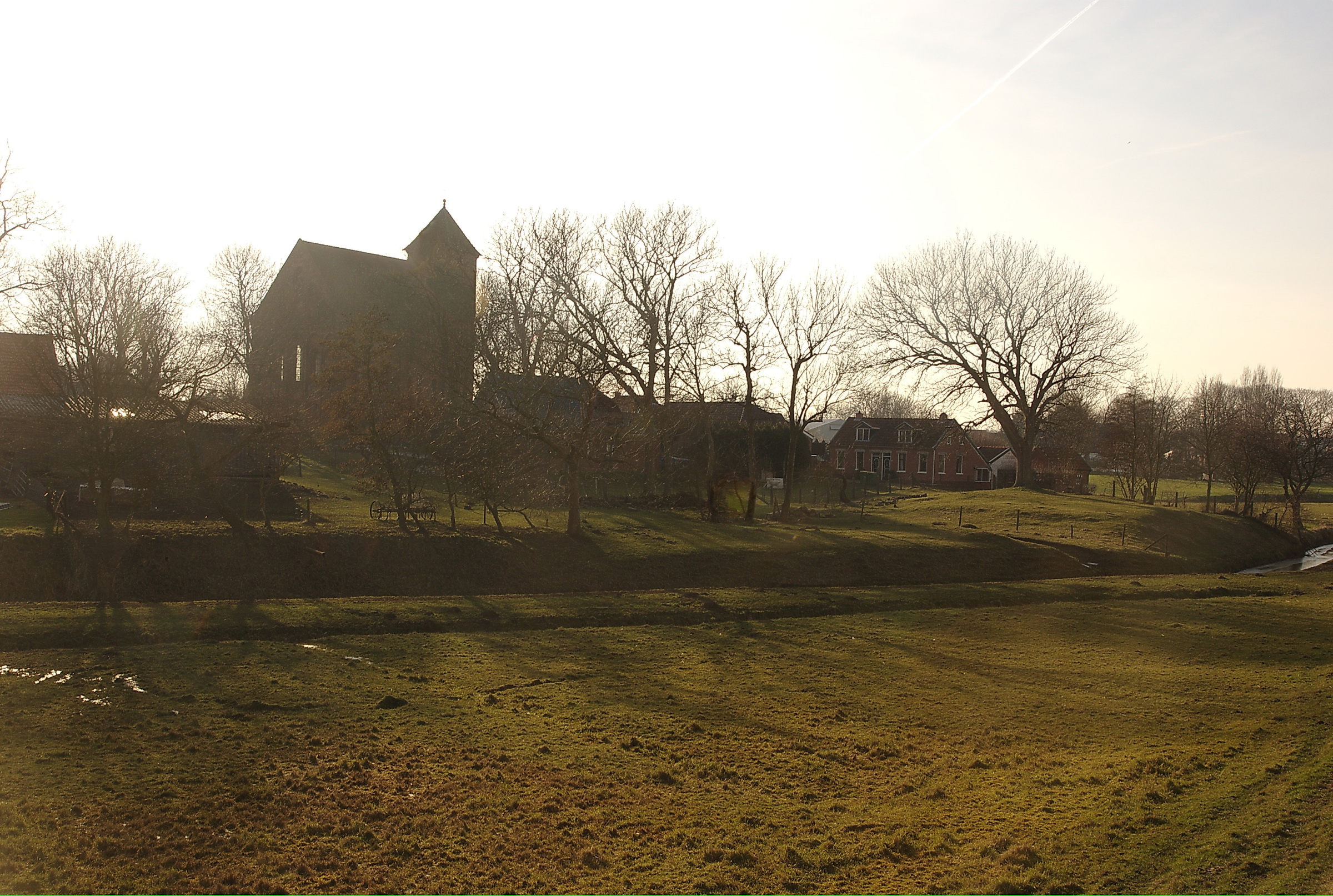
- Termunten in 2008

- Location in the province of Groningen in the Netherlands Termunten (Netherlands)
- Coordinates: 53°18′N 7°3′E
- Country: Netherlands
- Province: Groningen
- Municipality: Eemsdelta

Area
  - Total: 0.28 km^{2} (0.11 sq mi)
- Elevation: 0.6 m (2.0 ft)

Population (2021)
  - Total: 740
  - Density: 2,600/km^{2} (6,800/sq mi)
- Time zone: UTC+1 (CET)
  - Summer (DST): UTC+2 (CEST)
- Postal code: 9947
- Dialing code: 0596

Termunten (Dutch pronunciation: [tɛrˈmʏntə(n)]) is a village in the Dutch province of Groningen. It is a part of the municipality of Eemsdelta, and lies about 33 km east of Groningen.

Termunten was an independent municipality until 1990, when it was merged with Delfzijl.

== History ==
The village was first mentioned in 1224 as "in Menterne". The etymology is unclear. Termunten is a terp (artificial living hill) village with a grid structure from the early middle ages.

In 1258, a Cistercian monastery was founded in Termunten by the Aduard Abbey. The monastery was destroyed in 1569 and scavenged for dike construction. Around 1300, the former river Munte was dammed and a sluice was installed. The village of Termunterzijl developed around the sluice. The sluice was destroyed in 1686 by a flood. The current sluice was built in 1724 by the city of Groningen.

The Dutch Reformed church dates from the 13th century, but has some 12th century elements. It was enlarged several times, but damaged by war in 1945. In 1951, the church was restored and the current tower was built.

Termunten was home to 440 people in 1840. Between 1912 and 1948, there was a tram line between Ter Apel and Delfzijl. A train shed was located in Termunten which nowadays serves as a fish restaurant.

There are several bunkers near Termunten which were built by the Germans in 1944 to protect Delfzijl and Emden. In April 1945, there was a large battle at the so-called Delfzijl pocket. The battery used to contain the largest anti-aircraft gun of the Netherlands.

Termunten was an independent municipality until 1990, when it was merged into Delfzijl.

== Gallery ==
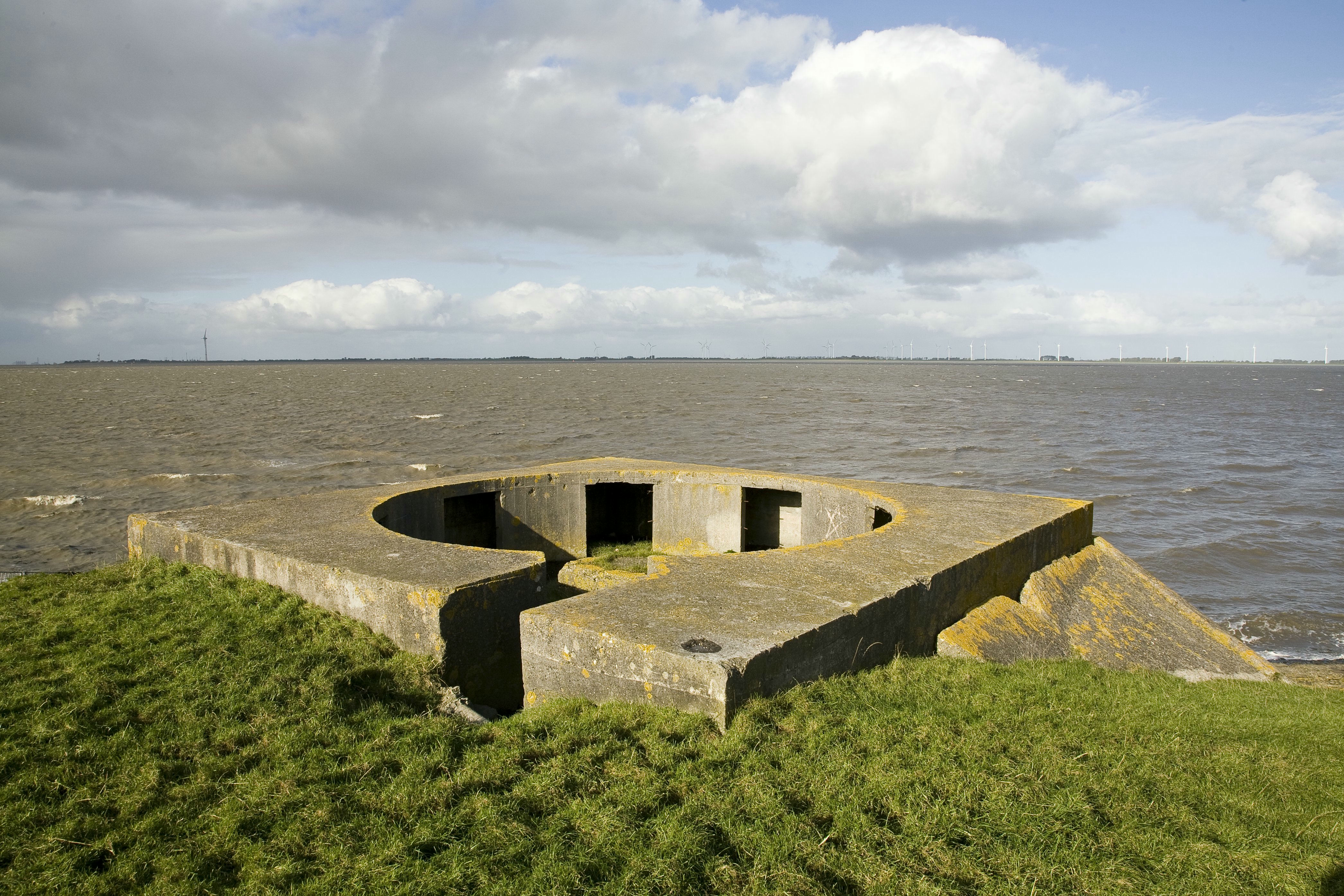
Remnant of an antiaircraft gun position built by the Germans in the Second World War along the coast at Termunten

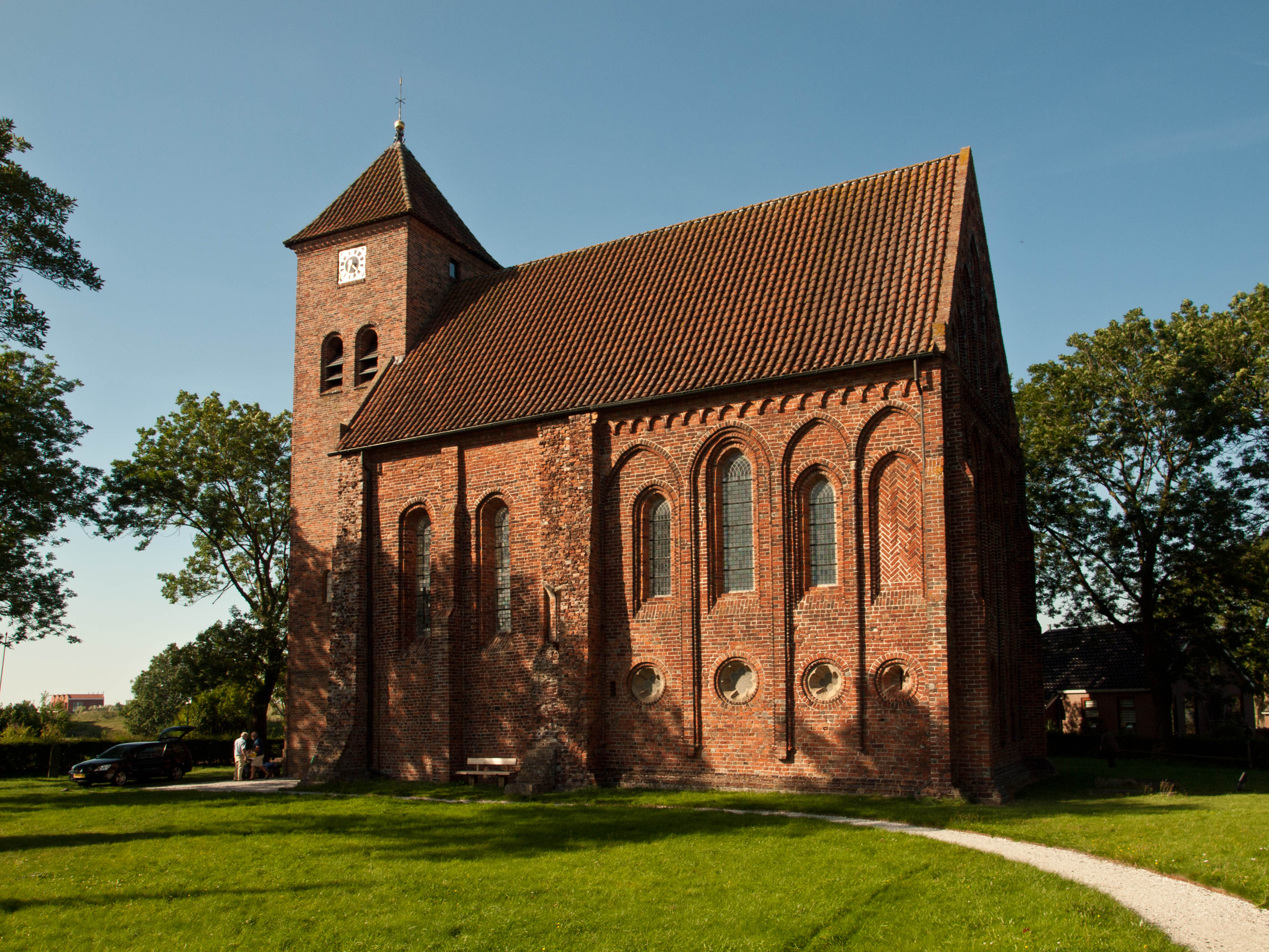
Ursus Church

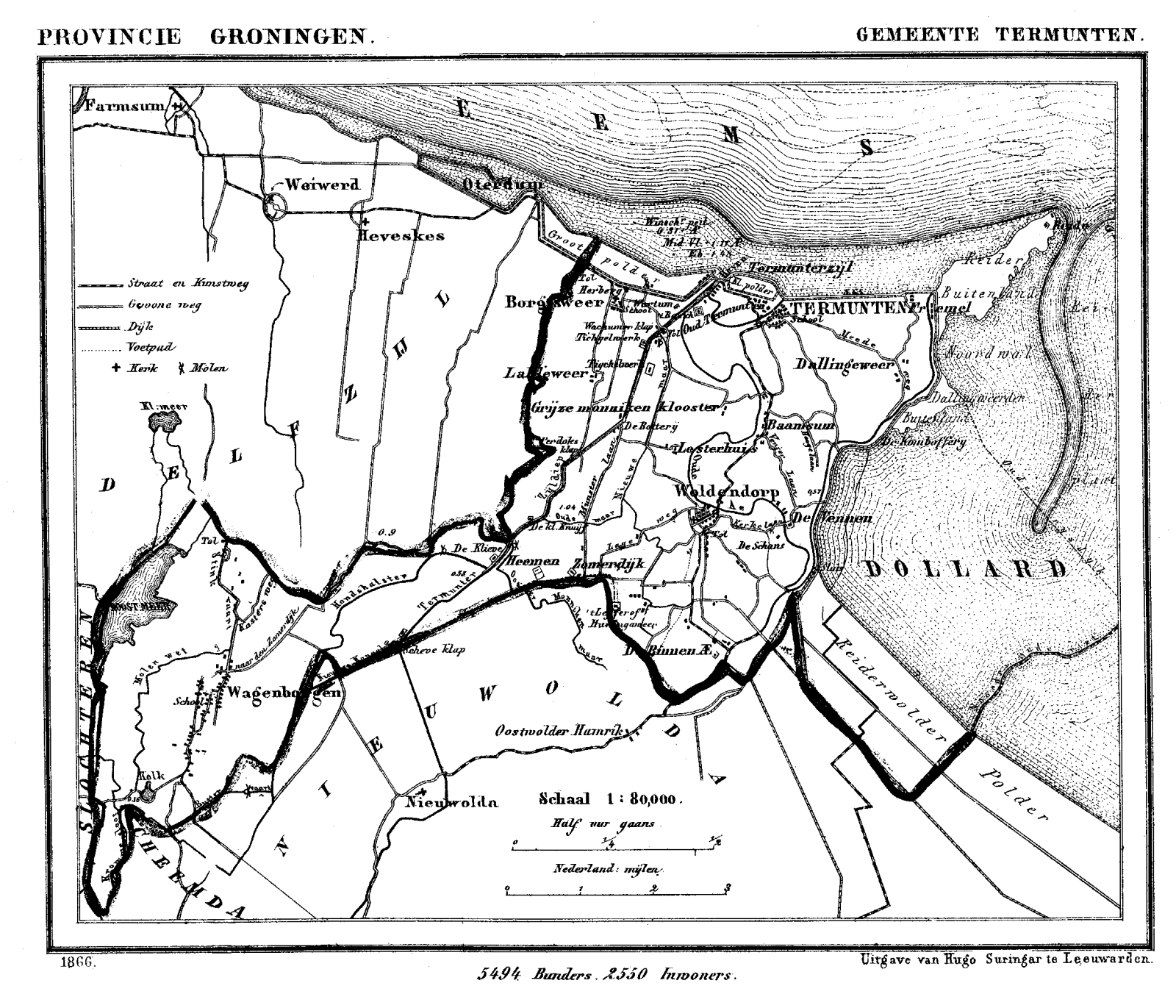
Map of Termunten from around 1868

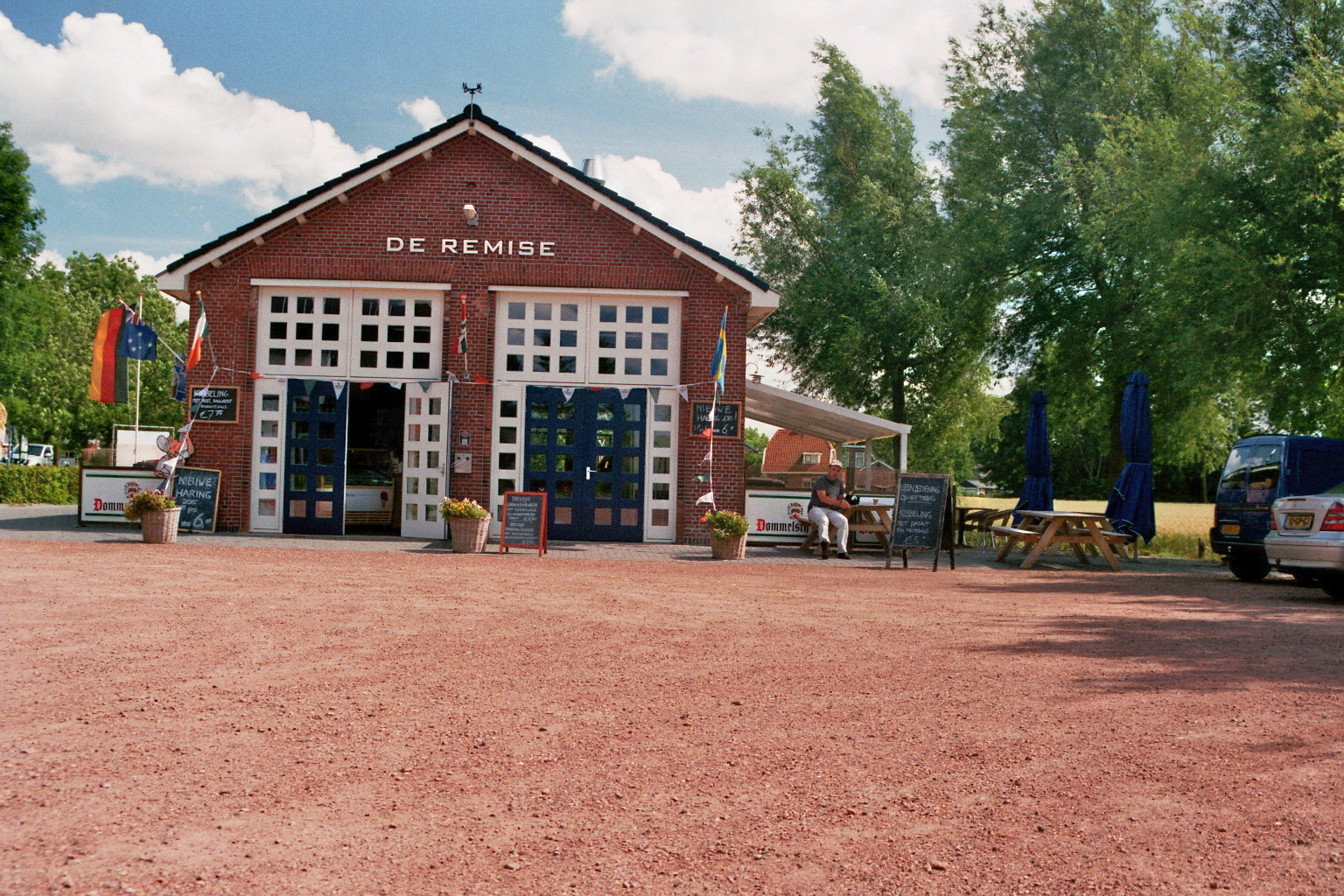
Train shed annex fish restaurant
