= Groningen =

City and municipality in the Netherlands

Groningen Grunnen, Grunn (Gronings)
- City and municipality
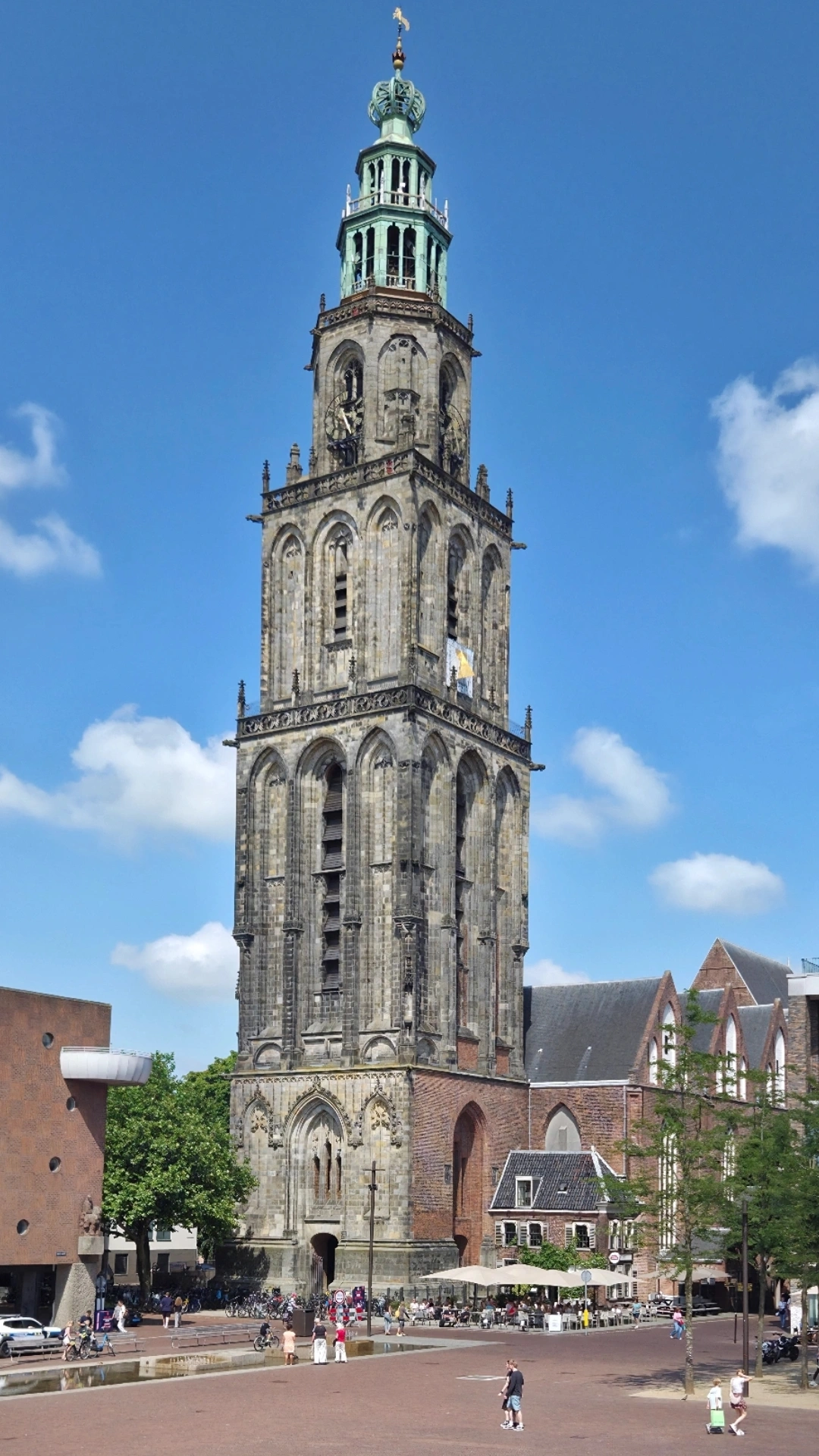
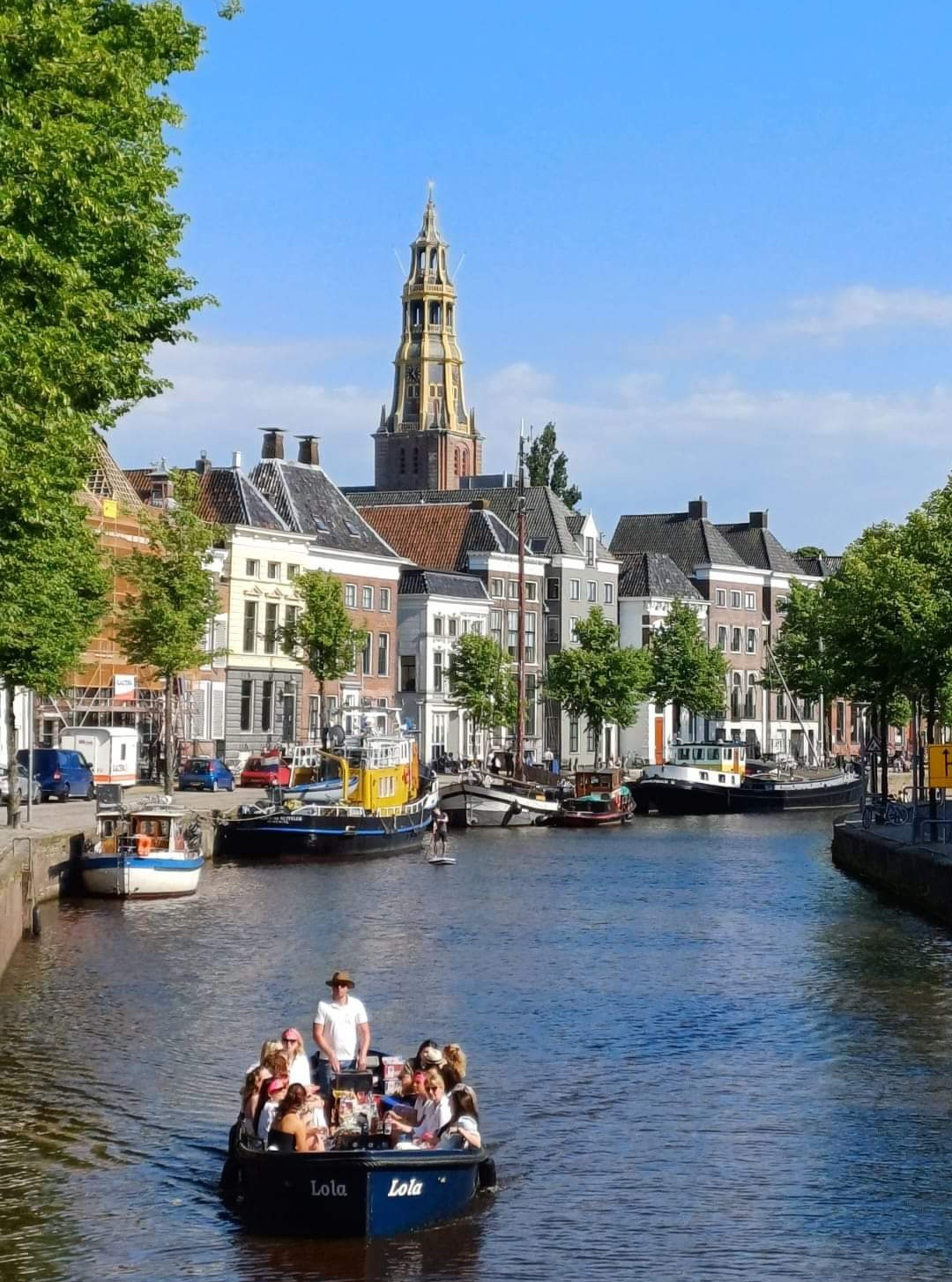
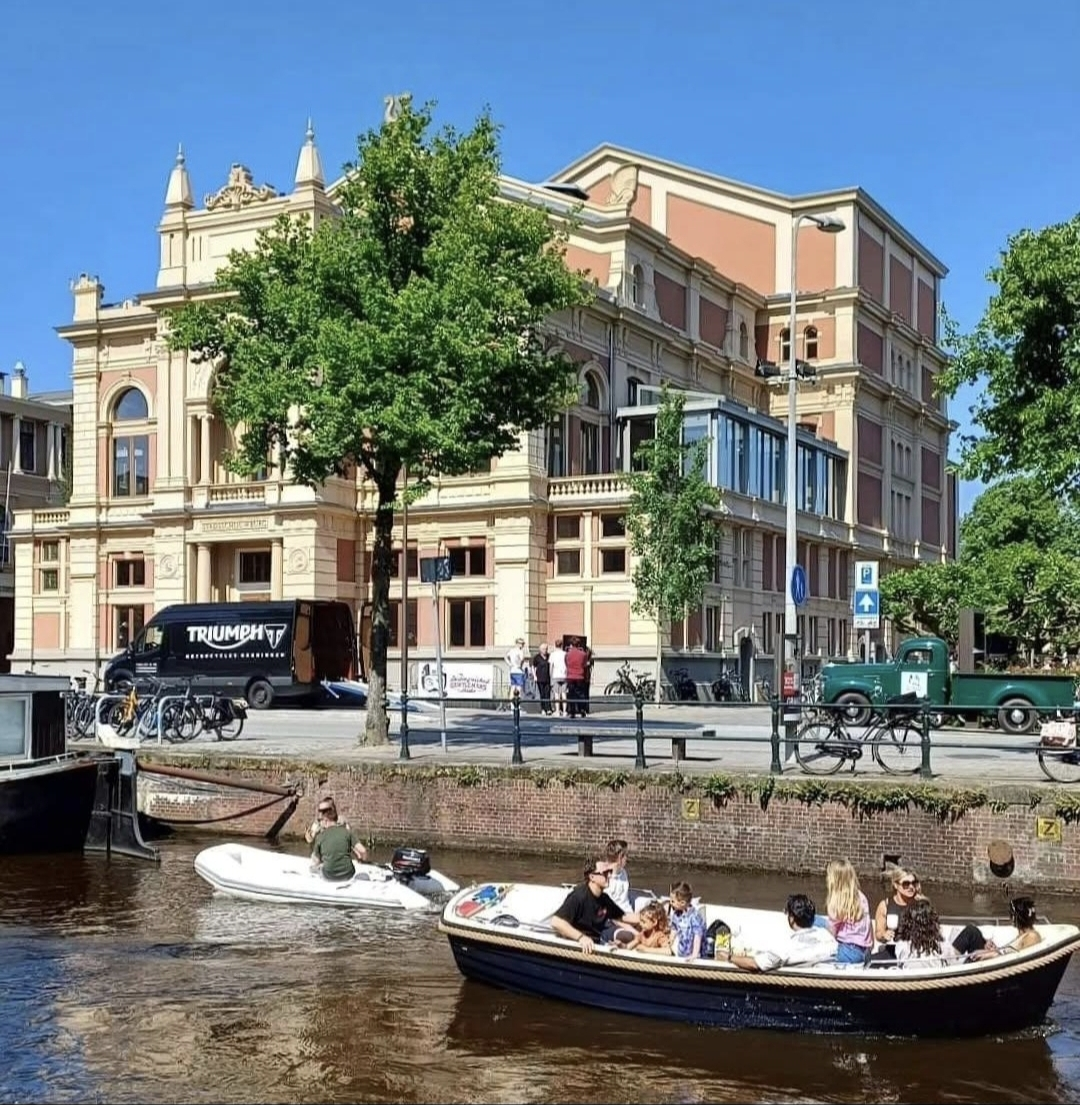
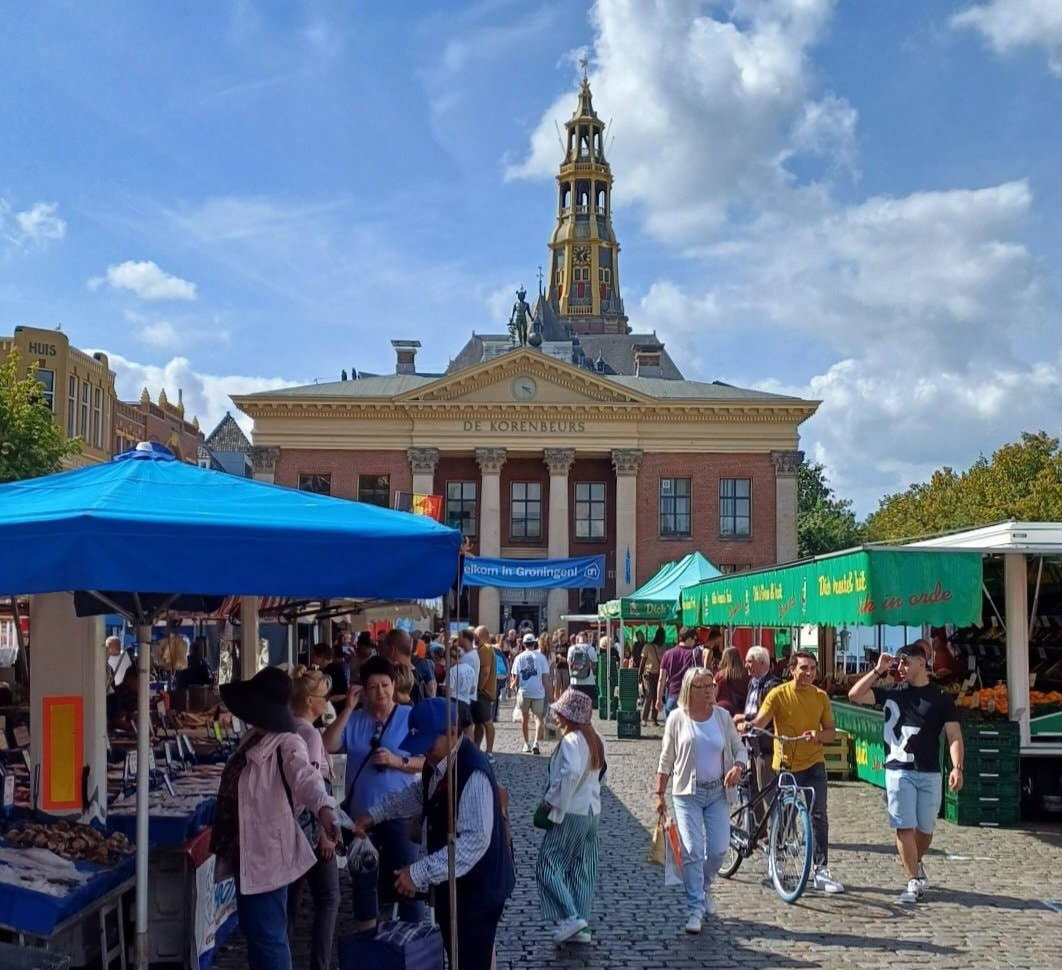
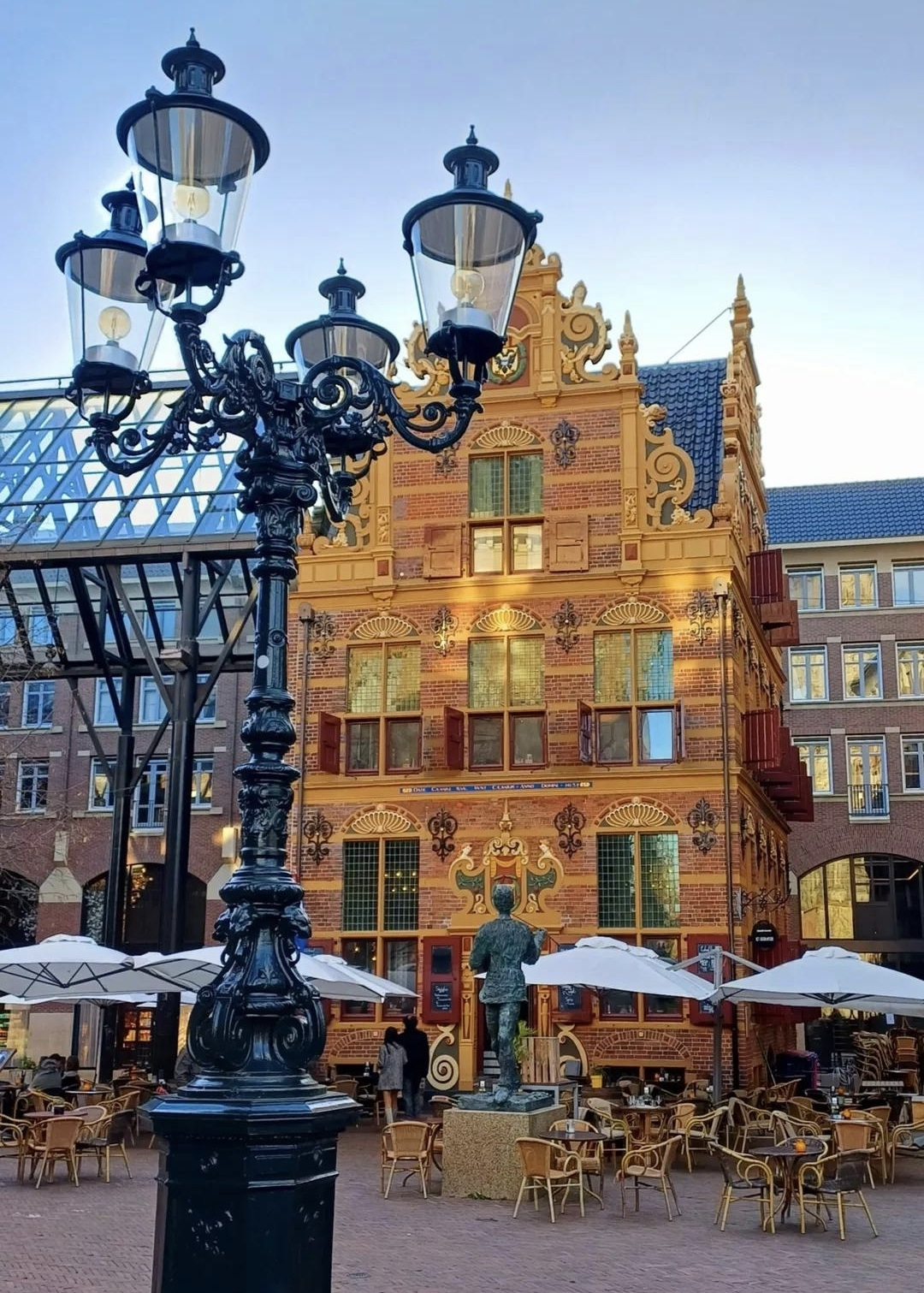
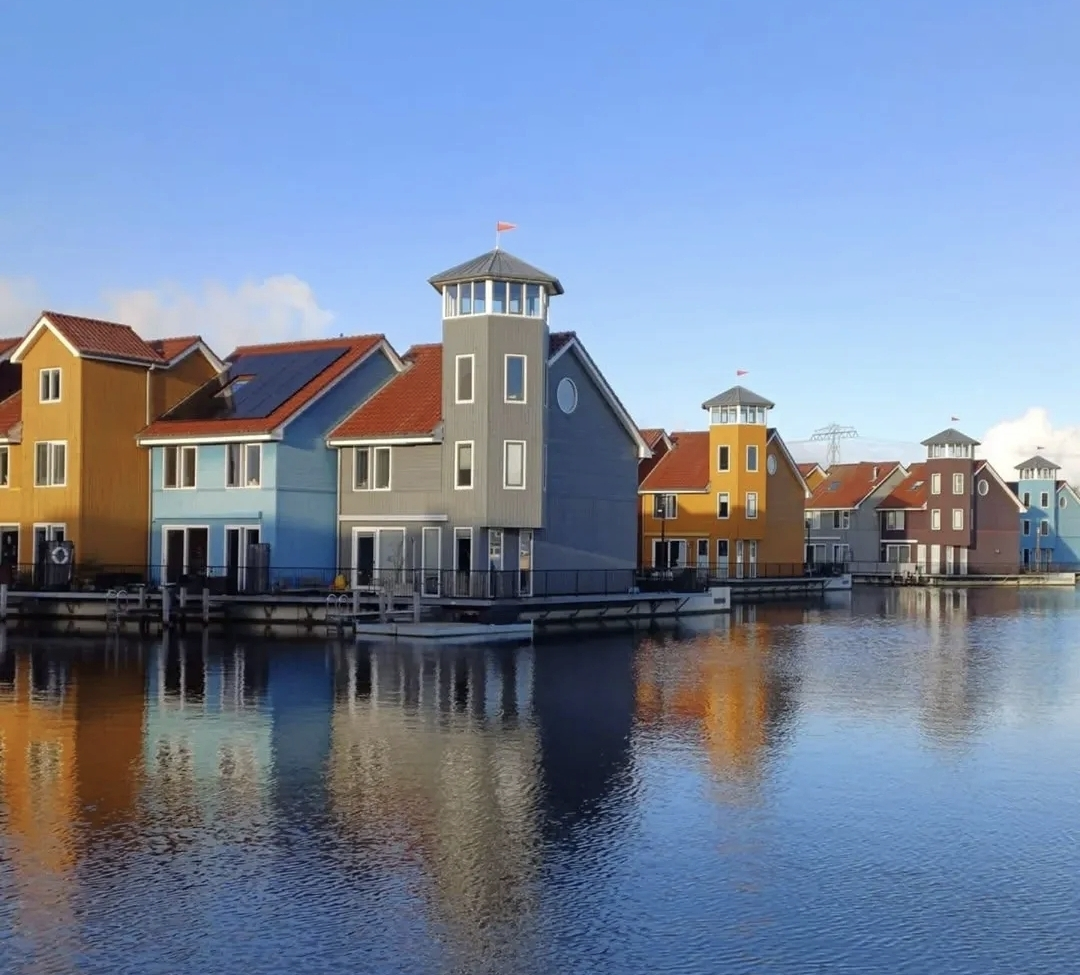
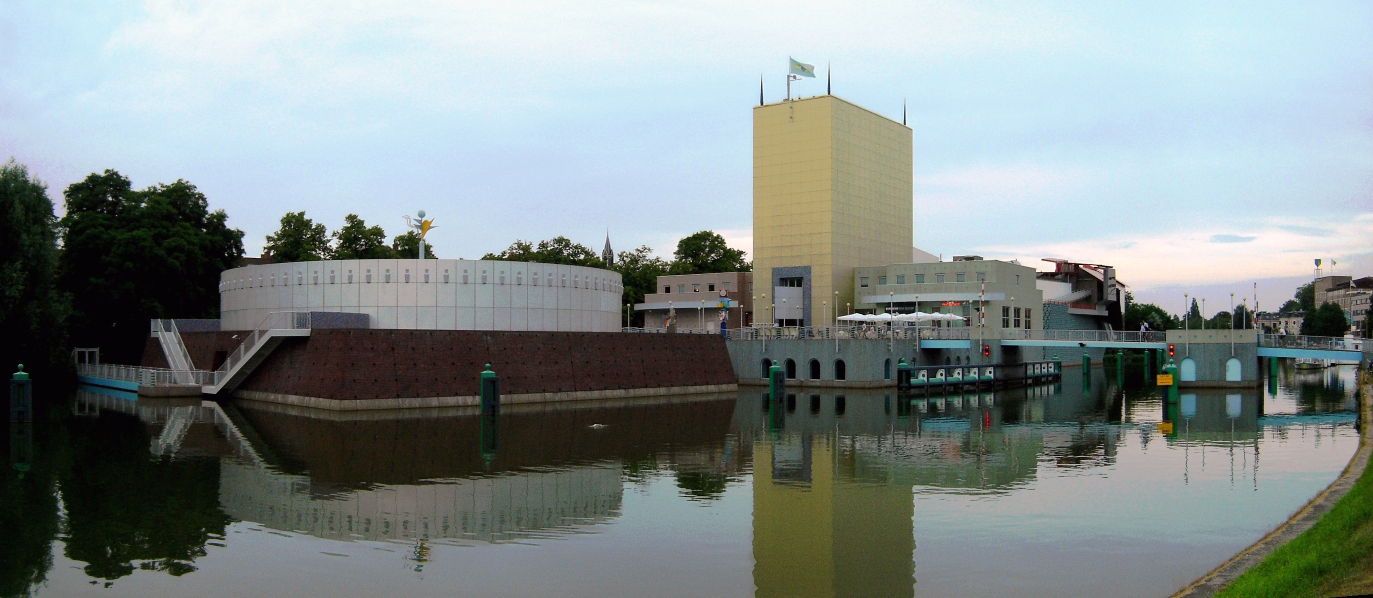
- Martinitoren Hoge der A Stadsschouwburg Theatre Aa Kerk and Korenbeurs Goudkantoor Reitdiephaven Groninger Museum

- Flag Coat of arms Brandmark

- Location in Groningen
- Interactive map of Groningen
- Location within the Netherlands Location within Europe
- Coordinates: 53°13′08″N 06°34′03″E
- Country: Netherlands
- Province: Groningen
- City Hall: Groningen City Hall

Government
  - Body: Municipal council
  - Mayor: Roelien Kamminga (VVD)

Area
  - Municipality: 197.96 km^{2} (76.43 sq mi)
  - Land: 185.60 km^{2} (71.66 sq mi)
  - Water: 12.36 km^{2} (4.77 sq mi)
- Elevation: 7 m (23 ft)
- Highest elevation: 12 m (39 ft)

Population (January 1st 2025)
  - Municipality: 244,807
  - Density: 1,317/km^{2} (3,410/sq mi)
  - Urban: 218,105
  - Metro: 557,369
- Demonym(s): Groninger, Stadjer
- Time zone: UTC+1 (CET)
  - Summer (DST): UTC+2 (CEST)
- Postcode: 9700–9747
- Area code: 050
- Website: gemeente.groningen.nl/en

Groningen (Note: /ˈɡroʊnɪŋən/ GROH-ning-ən, UK also /ˈɡrɒnɪŋən/ GRON-ing-ən; Dutch: [ˈɣroːnɪŋə(n)]; Gronings: Grunn or Grunnen.) is the capital city and main municipality of Groningen province in the Netherlands. Dubbed the "capital of the north", Groningen is the largest city as well as the economic and cultural centre of the northern part of the country; as of January 2025, it had 244,807 inhabitants, making it the sixth largest city/municipality in the Netherlands and the second largest outside the Randstad. As of 2025, the Groningen metro area had a population of 557,369 inhabitants.

Groningen was established more than 980 years ago and gained city rights de facto in 1245, making it one of the oldest cities in the Netherlands, although no written records of a formal grant of city rights remain. Due to its relatively isolated location from the successive Dutch centres of power (Utrecht, The Hague, Brussels), Groningen was historically reliant on itself and nearby regions. As a Hanseatic city, it was part of the North German trade network, but later it mainly became a regional market centre. At the height of its power in the 15th century, Groningen could be considered an independent city-state and it remained autonomous until the late 18th century, when it was incorporated into the Napoleonic Batavian Republic.

Today Groningen is a university city, home to some of the country's leading higher education institutes; University of Groningen (Rijksuniversiteit Groningen), which is the Netherlands's second oldest university, and Hanze University of Applied Sciences (Hanzehogeschool Groningen). Students comprise an estimated 25% of its total population, making it the country's demographically youngest city (although Urk is the youngest municipality overall).

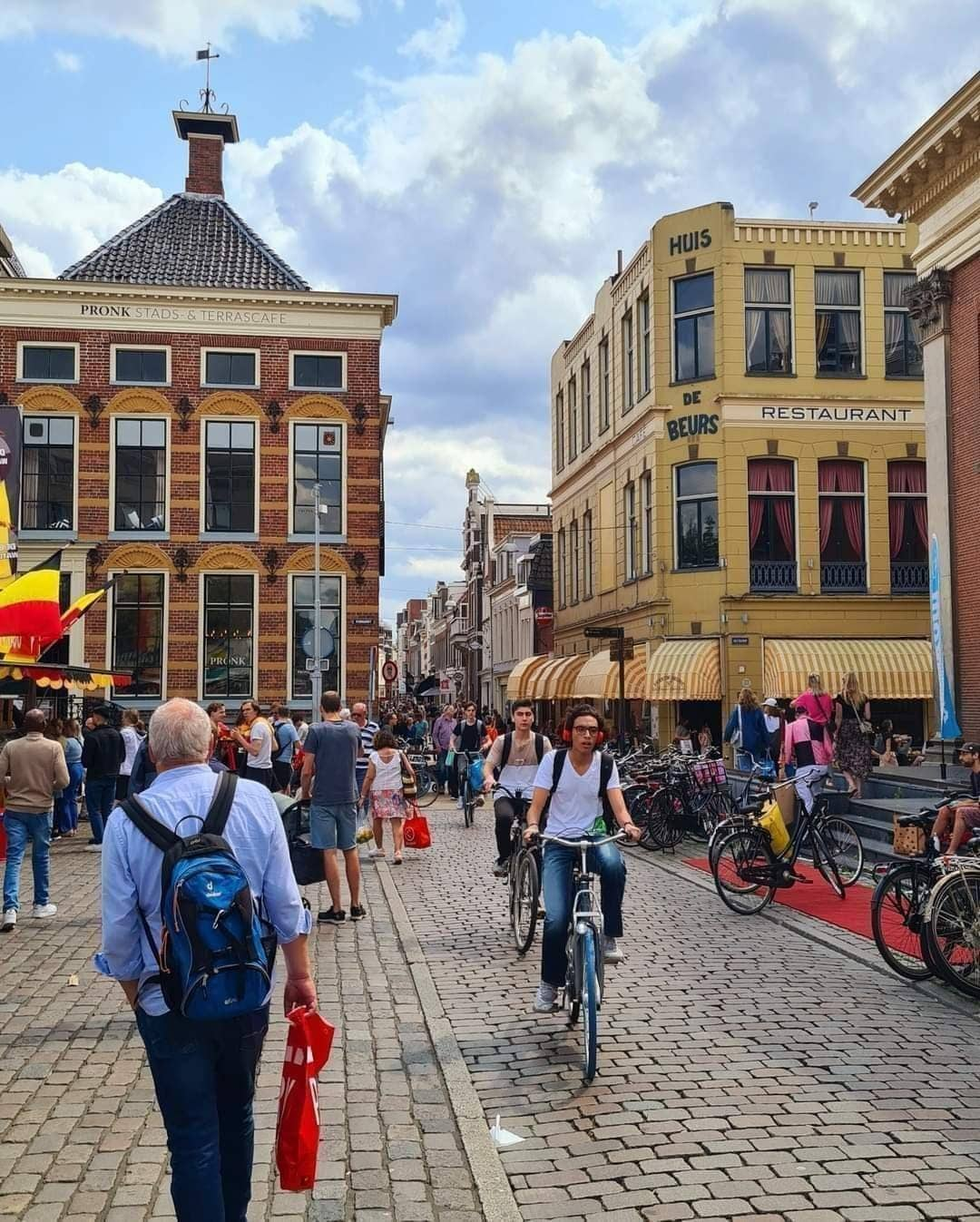
Groningen is a cycling city

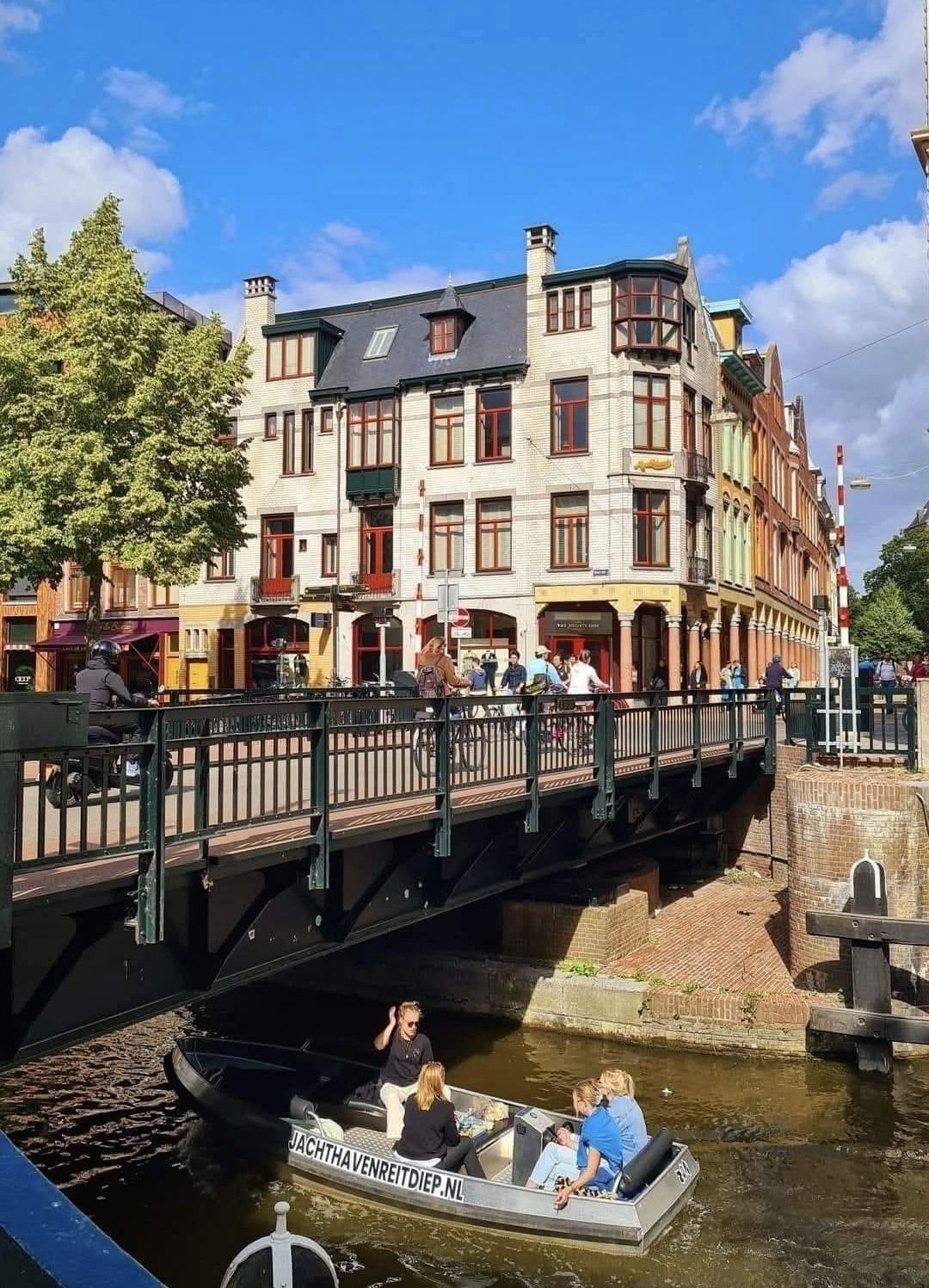
A bridge at Hoge der A and Brugstraat

== Etymology ==
The origin and meaning of 'Groningen' and its older variant, 'Groeningen', are uncertain. A folk origin story relates the idea that, in 453 BC, exiles from Troy who were guided by a mythical figure called Gruno (or Grunius, Gryns or Grunus), along with a group of Phrygians from Germany, founded a settlement in what is now Groningen, and built a castle on the bank of the Hunze, which they called 'Grunoburg', and which was later destroyed by the Vikings.

One modern theory is that 'Groningen' meant 'among the people of Groni' ('Groningi' and 'Groninga' in the 11th century), derived from Gronesbeke, which was the old name for a small lake near the Hunze (on the northern border of Zuidlaarderveen). As the name Grone (variant Groene) is an old Frisian personal name, the origin may very well be in a settlement originally founded by the family of Grone and their followers, which in Frisian would be called Groninga. Another theory is that the name was derived from the word groenighe, meaning 'green fields'.

In Frisian, it is called Grins. In Groningen province, it is called Groot Loug. Regionally, it is often simply referred to as Stad (the "city"), and its inhabitants are referred to as Stadjers or Stadjeder. The Dutch sometimes refer to it as "the Metropolis of the North", or Martinistad (after the Martinitoren tower).

== History ==
The city was founded at the northernmost point of the Hondsrug area. While the oldest document referring to Groningen's existence dates from 1040, the area was occupied by Saxons centuries prior. The oldest archaeological evidence of a settlement in the region stems from around 3950–3650 BC, and the first major settlement in Groningen trace back to the year 3 AD.

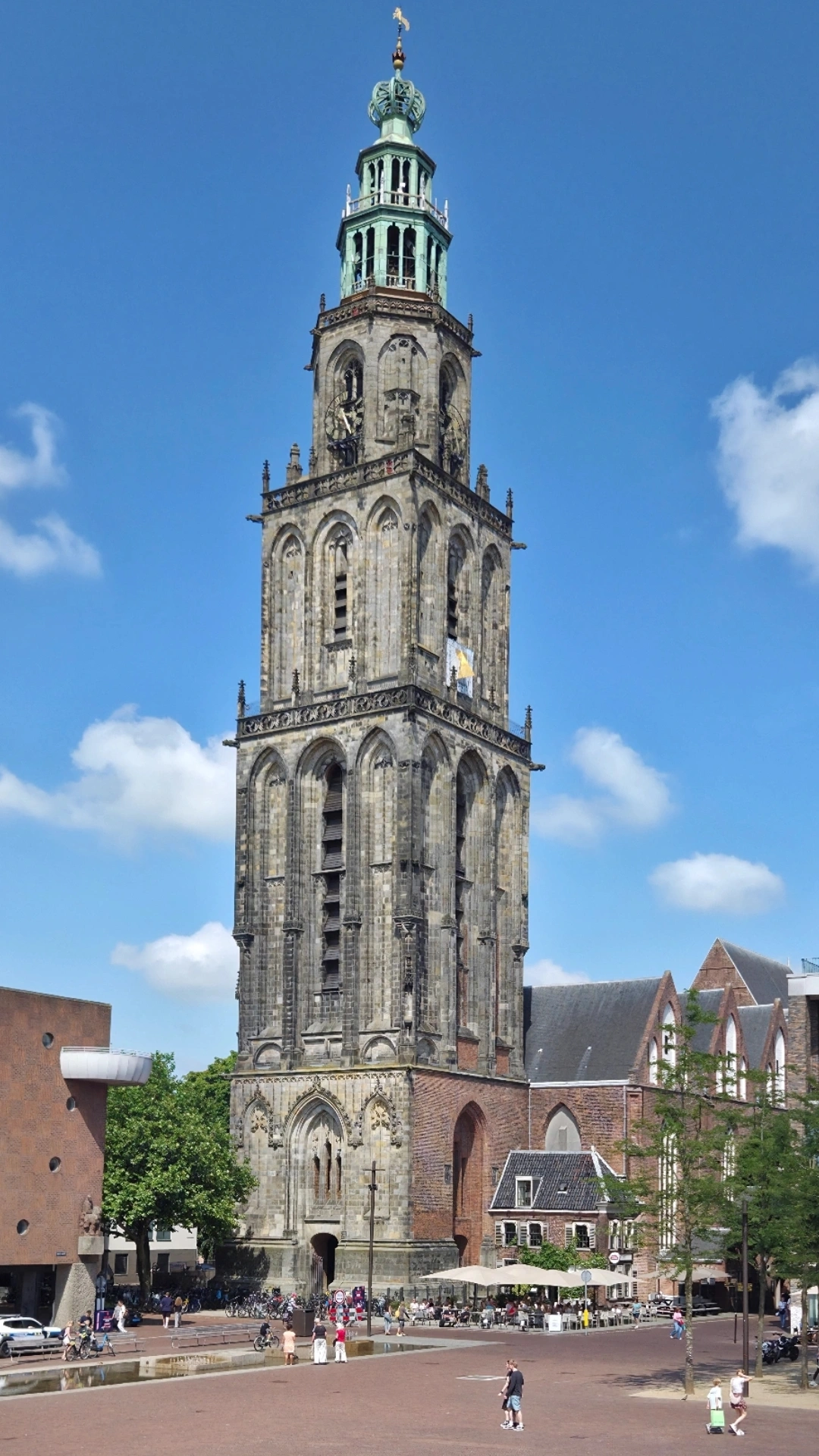
Martinitoren, Grote Markt Groningen

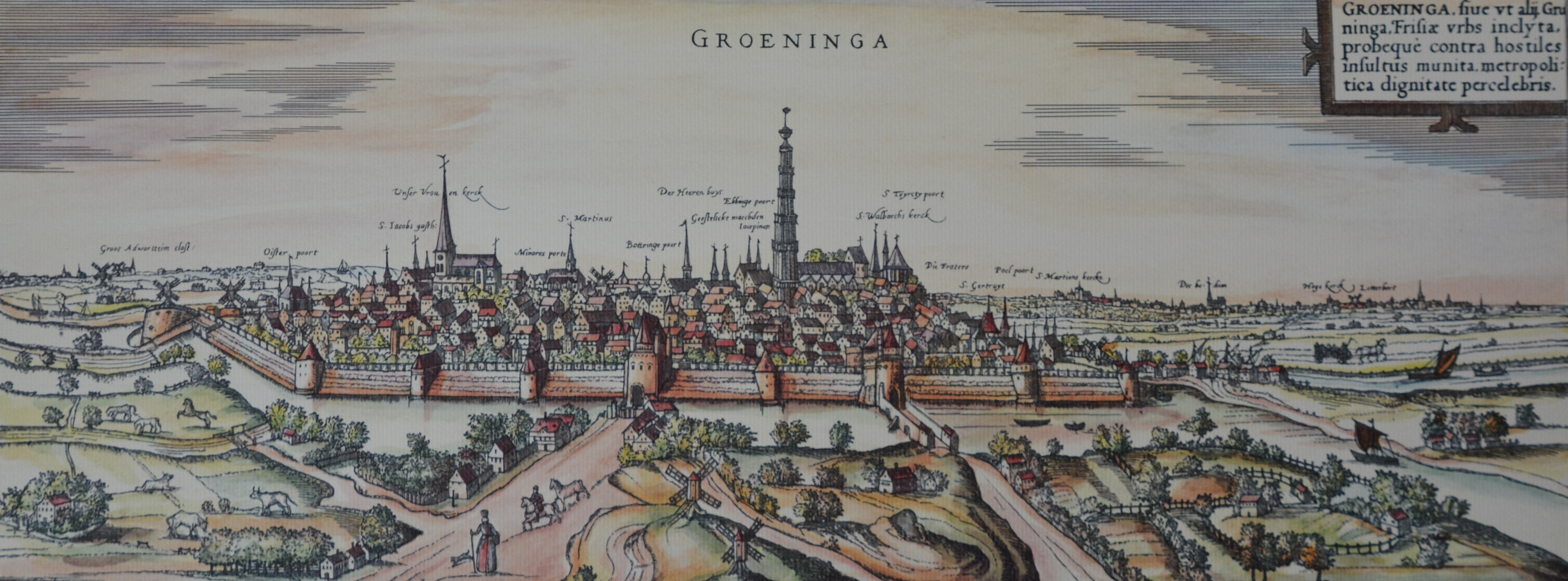
Groningen in the 16th century

In the 13th century Groningen was an important trade centre and its inhabitants built a city wall to underline its authority. The city had a strong influence on its surrounding lands and the Gronings dialect became common. The city's most influential period was at the end of the 15th century, when the nearby province of Friesland was administered from Groningen. During these years the Martinitoren was built, which is considered to be the city's most significant landmark.

In 1536, Groningen accepted Emperor Charles V, the King of Spain and the Habsburg ruler of the other Netherlands as its ruler, thus ending the region's autonomy. The city was captured in the Siege of Groningen (1594) by the Dutch and English forces led by Maurice of Nassau. After the siege, the city and the province joined the Dutch Republic.

During the 17th century, Groningen served as a crucial hub for the Dutch West India Company (WIC). This powerful trading company was responsible for maritime trade, colonization, and the transportation of goods and people.

The WIC transported over 300,000 slaves from the African coast to the Dutch colonies between 1621 and 1792. Warships like the Groeningen sailed from Groningen's shipyards to Africa's west coast, carrying enslaved Africans to plantations in Brazil, Suriname, and the Antilles. These same ships returned to Europe laden with valuable commodities such as sugar, coffee, and tobacco.

The University of Groningen was founded in 1614 with initial course offerings in law, medicine, theology and philosophy. During this period the city expanded rapidly and a new city wall was built.

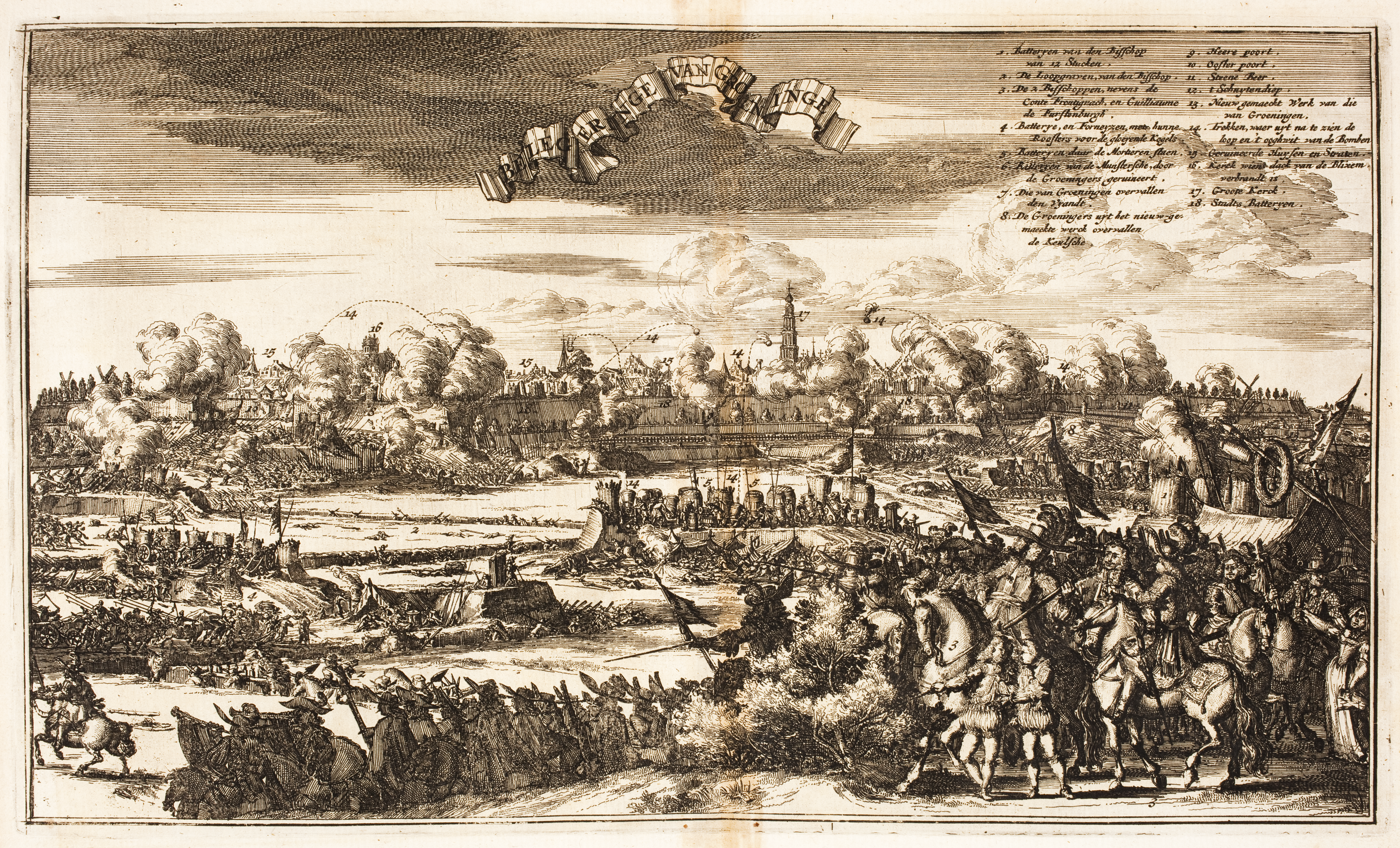
Siege of Groningen by Bishop of Münster in 1672

The Siege of Groningen (1672) led by the bishop of Münster, Bernhard von Galen, during the Third Anglo-Dutch War failed and the city walls resisted; an event that is celebrated annually with music and fireworks on 28 August as "Gronings Ontzet" or "Bommen Berend" ("Bombing Bernard"). In the early 19th century when the kingdom of Holland under king Jerôme Bonaparte was founded, Groningen was integrated into the French system of administration, and then annexed in 1811 into the French Empire under emperor Napoleon I (until 1813). During the French administration of the area, Groningen was called Groningue.

During World War II, the main square and the Grote Markt were largely destroyed in the Battle of Groningen in April 1945. However, the church Martinitoren, the Goudkantoor, and the city hall were undamaged.

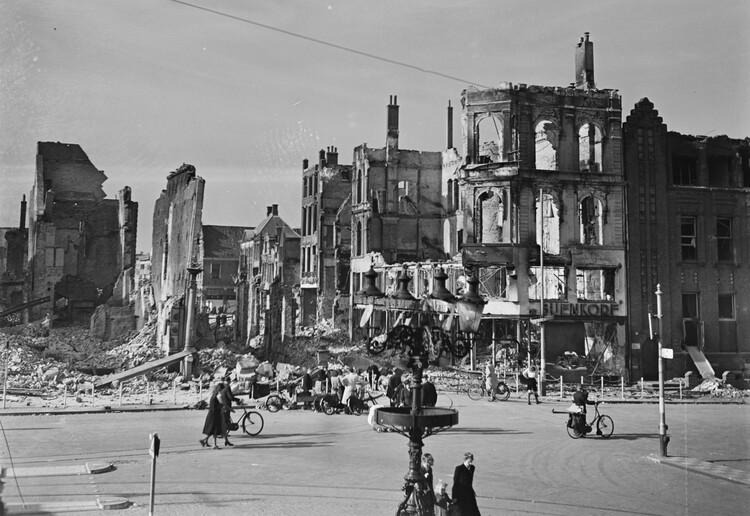
Grote Markt 1945 Groningen

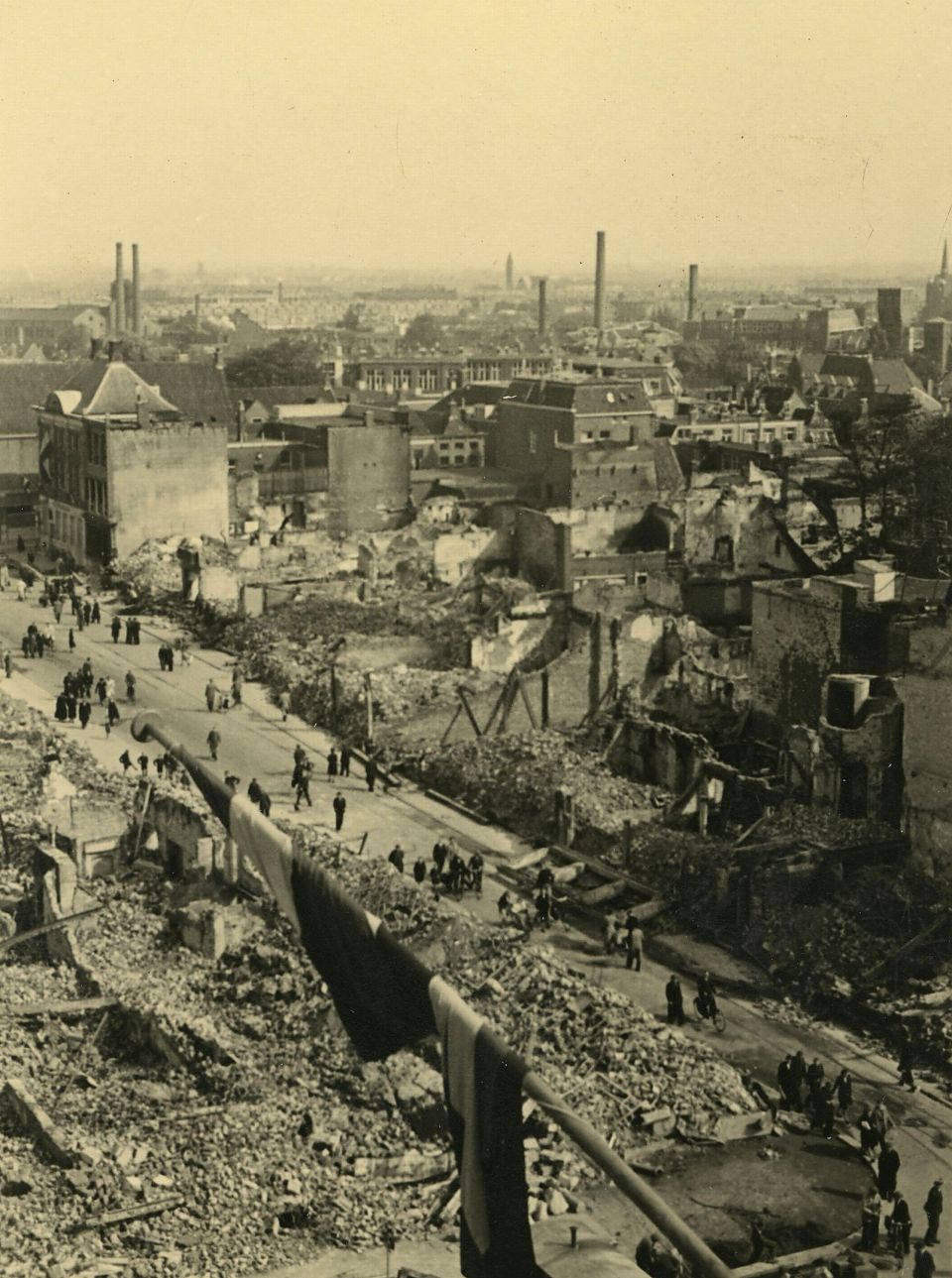
Oude Ebbingestraat 1945 Groningen

== Geography ==
There is a town named after Groningen in Saramacca District, Suriname, a former Dutch colony. It was named after the hometown of Dutch governor-general of Suriname Jan Wichers, who established the town as a fort in 1790.

=== Canals ===
Numerous canals (grachten) surround the city, locally called diep.

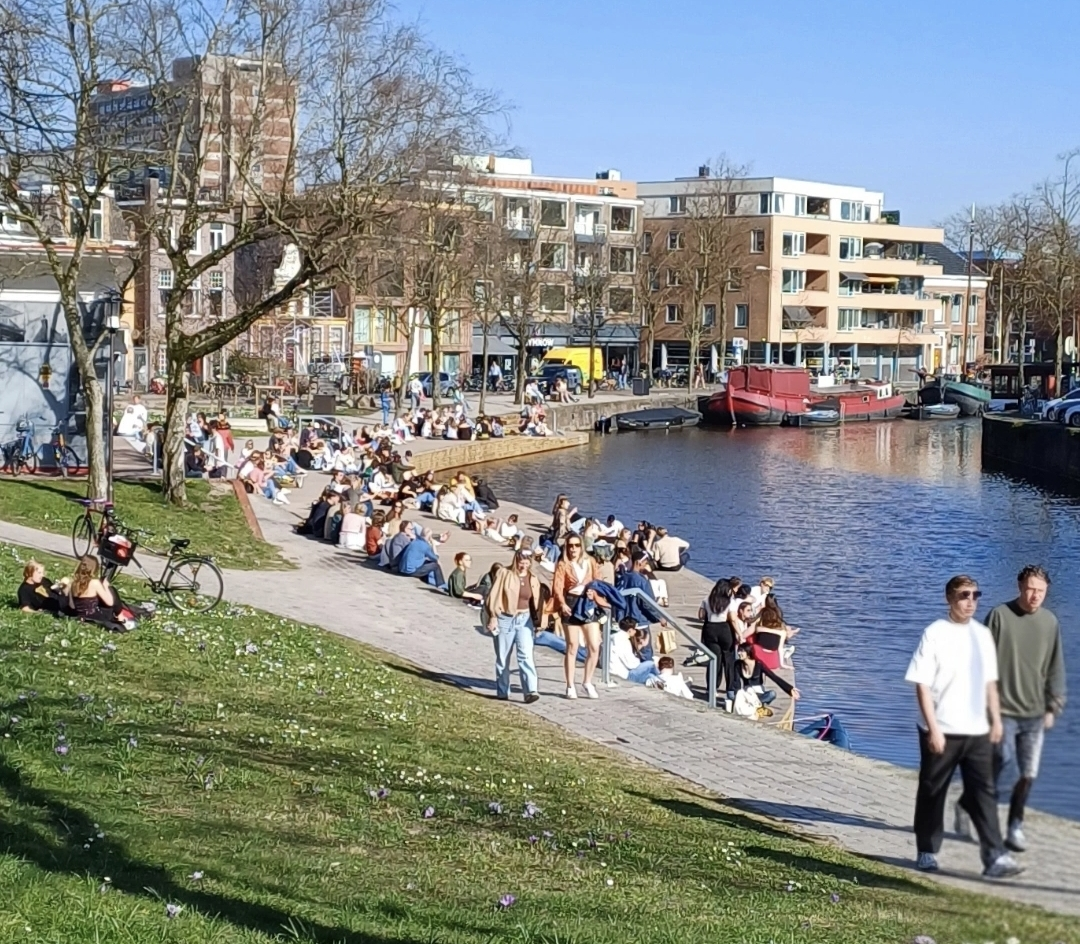
Dudok at the canal

The major canals that travel from the city are the Van Starkenborgh Canal, Eems Canal, and Winschoterdiep. Groningen's canals, no longer used for commercial goods transport, were once vital hubs in trade and transport. The rivers crossing close to the Binnenstad have been used for trade for at least a thousand years. The Dutch West India Company and foreign investors established their Groningen headquarters in Reitemakersrijge. Additional warehouses were strategically built along the canals at Noorderhaven to store colonial produce. These warehouses often held goods obtained from plantations in the Dutch colonies.

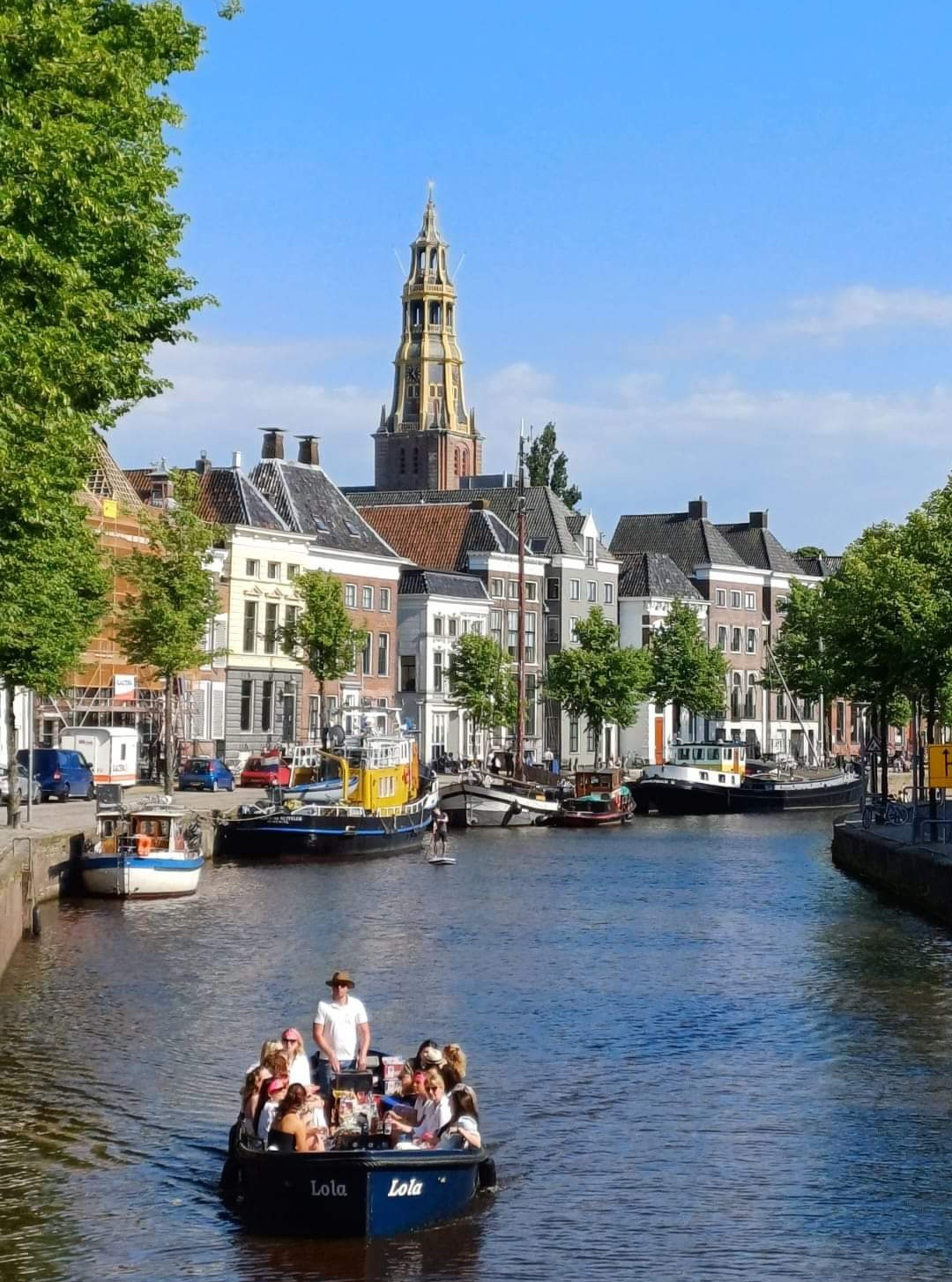
Hoge der A

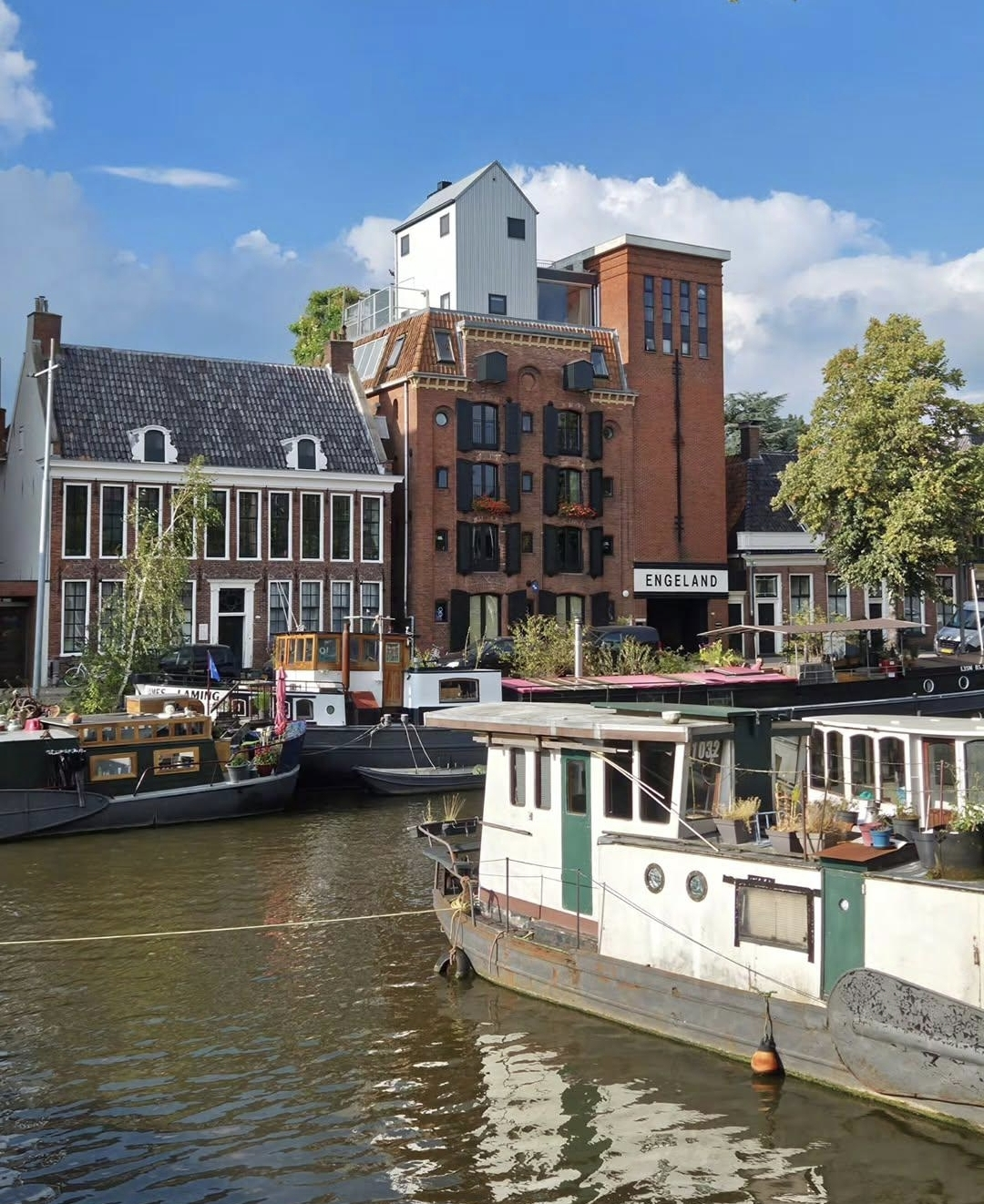
Noorderhaven

=== Climate ===
Groningen has an oceanic temperate climate, like all of the Netherlands, although slightly colder in winter than other major cities in the Netherlands due to its northeasterly position. Weather is influenced by the North Sea to the north-west and its prevailing north-western winds and gales.

Summers are somewhat warm and humid. Temperatures of 30 °C (86 °F) or higher occur sporadically; the average daytime high is around 22 °C (72 °F). Very rainy periods are common, especially in spring and summer. Average annual precipitation is about 800 mm (31 in). Annual sunshine hours vary, but are usually below 1600 hours, giving much cloud cover similar to most of the Netherlands. Climate in this area has mild differences between highs and lows, and there is adequate rainfall year-round. The Köppen Climate Classification subtype for this climate is "Cfb". (Marine West Coast Climate/Oceanic climate).

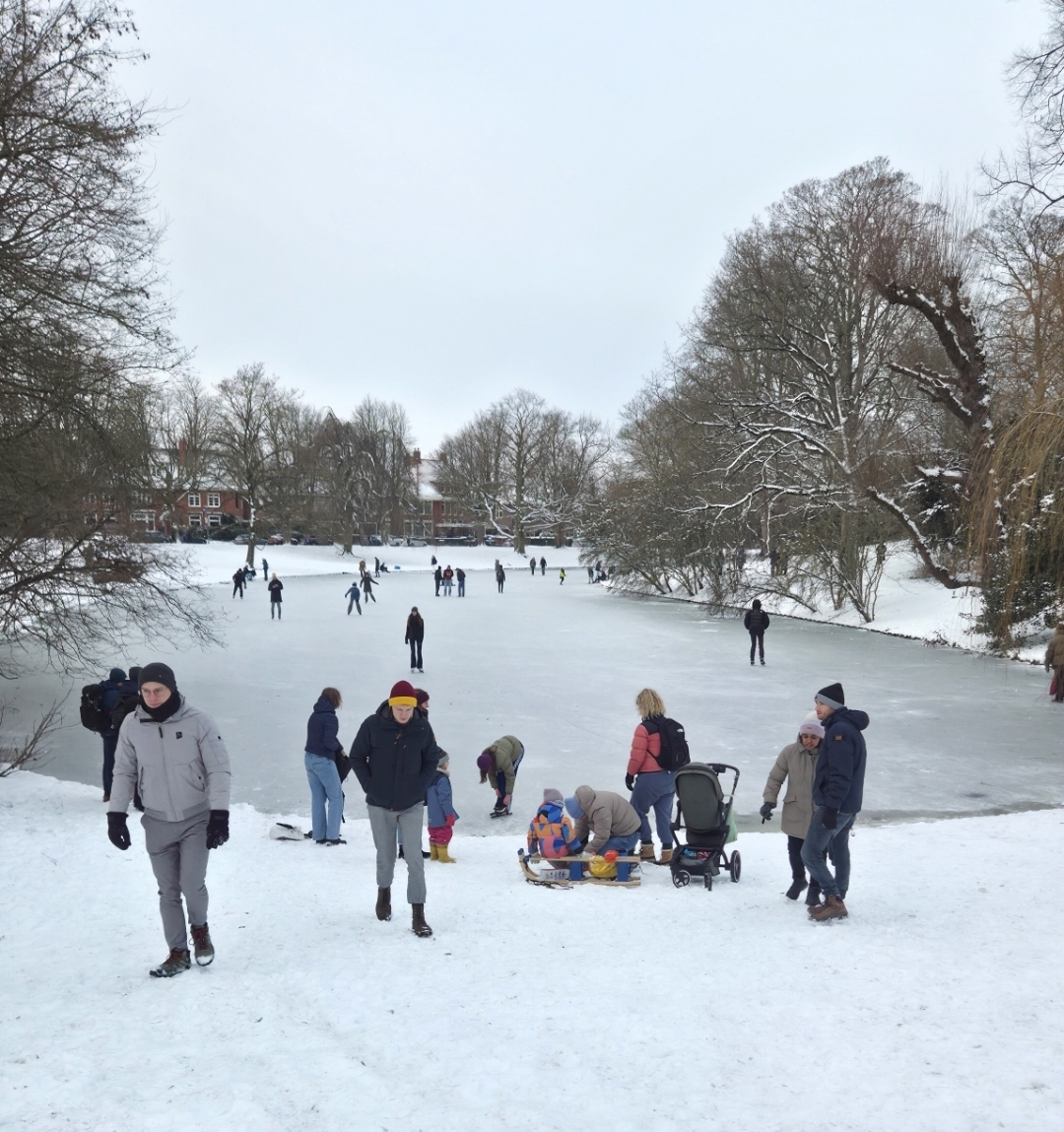
Iceskating in Noorderplantsoen 2026

Winters are cool; on average above freezing, although frosts are common during spells of easterly winds. Night-time temperatures of −10 °C (14 °F) or lower are not uncommon during cold winter periods. The lowest temperature ever recorded is −26.8 °C (−16.2 °F) on 16 February 1956. Snow often falls, but rarely stays long due to warmer daytime temperatures, although white snowy days happen every winter.

Climate data for Groningen (Groningen Airport Eelde), 1991–2020 normals, extremes 1906–present
Month	Jan	Feb	Mar	Apr	May	Jun	Jul	Aug	Sep	Oct	Nov	Dec	Year
Record high °C (°F)	14.5 (58.1)	18.9 (66.0)	24.0 (75.2)	28.8 (83.8)	32.8 (91.0)	33.8 (92.8)	36.9 (98.4)	36.3 (97.3)	32.6 (90.7)	27.4 (81.3)	19.4 (66.9)	15.4 (59.7)	36.9 (98.4)
Mean daily maximum °C (°F)	5.2 (41.4)	6.0 (42.8)	9.5 (49.1)	14.2 (57.6)	17.6 (63.7)	20.4 (68.7)	22.7 (72.9)	22.6 (72.7)	19.0 (66.2)	14.2 (57.6)	9.0 (48.2)	5.9 (42.6)	13.9 (57.0)
Daily mean °C (°F)	2.8 (37.0)	3.0 (37.4)	5.5 (41.9)	9.0 (48.2)	12.5 (54.5)	15.4 (59.7)	17.5 (63.5)	17.3 (63.1)	14.1 (57.4)	10.3 (50.5)	6.3 (43.3)	3.5 (38.3)	9.8 (49.6)
Mean daily minimum °C (°F)	−0.8 (30.6)	−0.8 (30.6)	1.4 (34.5)	3.7 (38.7)	7.0 (44.6)	9.9 (49.8)	12.2 (54.0)	11.9 (53.4)	9.6 (49.3)	6.3 (43.3)	3.2 (37.8)	0.8 (33.4)	5.5 (41.9)
Record low °C (°F)	−22.0 (−7.6)	−26.8 (−16.2)	−18.4 (−1.1)	−8.1 (17.4)	−3.4 (25.9)	0.1 (32.2)	2.5 (36.5)	3.2 (37.8)	−1.0 (30.2)	−6.9 (19.6)	−13.6 (7.5)	−22.0 (−7.6)	−26.8 (−16.2)
Average precipitation mm (inches)	72.7 (2.86)	54.7 (2.15)	54.1 (2.13)	41.3 (1.63)	57.9 (2.28)	65.0 (2.56)	85.0 (3.35)	77.8 (3.06)	75.4 (2.97)	71.4 (2.81)	70.0 (2.76)	79.4 (3.13)	804.7 (31.68)
Average precipitation days (≥ 1 mm)	13.3	10.6	10.3	8.5	9.5	10.3	11.7	11.5	11.1	12.1	13.2	14.0	136.1
Average snowy days	8	7	5	2	0	0	0	0	0	0	3	6	31
Average relative humidity (%)	90	88	85	79	79	81	82	83	86	89	91	92	85
Mean monthly sunshine hours	60.7	86.1	139.0	188.7	218.0	198.6	212.3	196.3	150.7	112.9	63.4	56.1	1,682.8
Source: Royal Netherlands Meteorological Institute

== Economy ==
Hotel and catering industries constitute a significant part of the economy in Groningen. Focus on business services has increased over time and areas such as IT, life sciences, tourism, energy, and environment have developed.

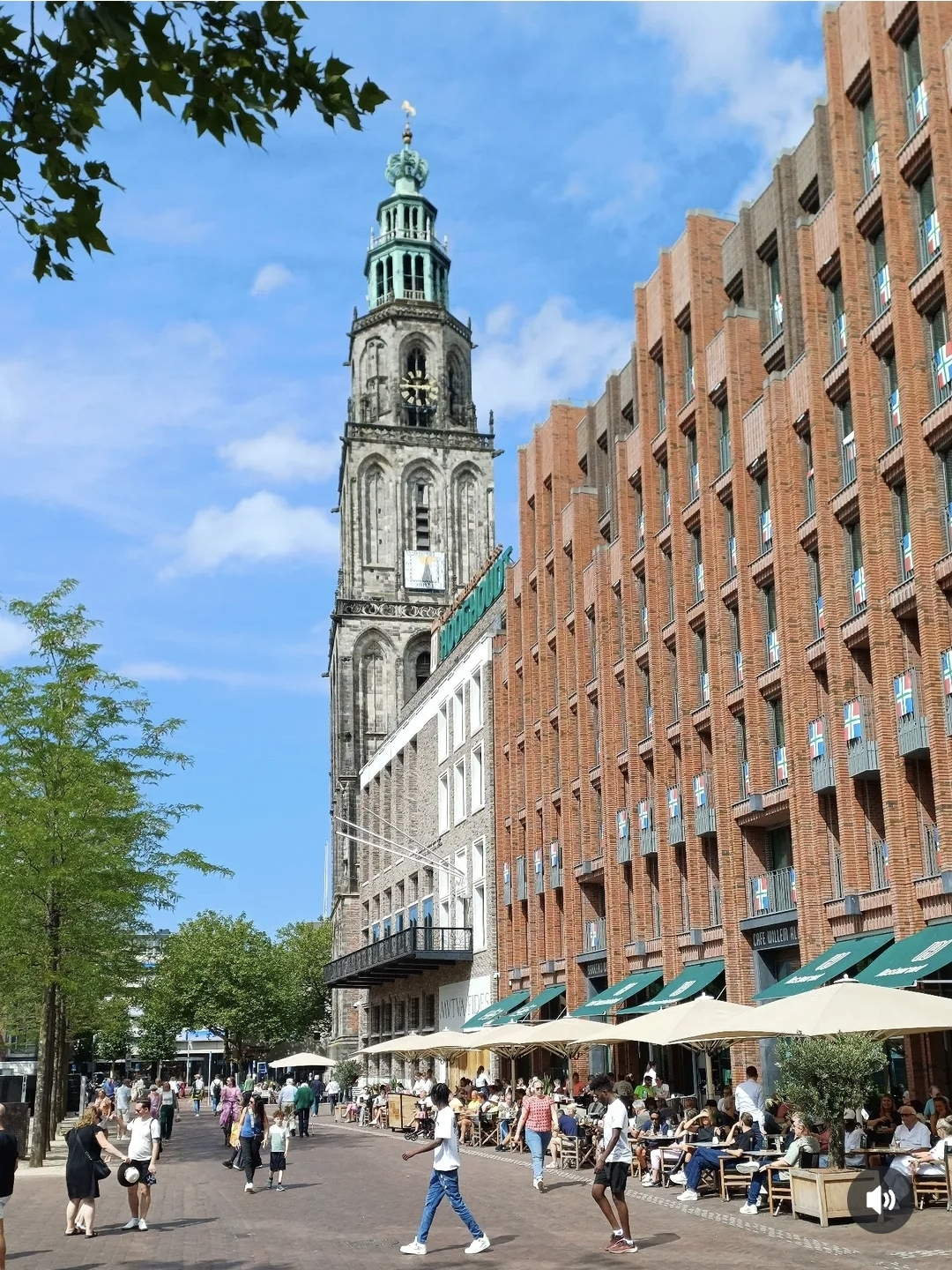
Terrace The Market Hotel at Grote Markt

Until 2008 there were two major beet sugar factories within the city. The Suiker Unie plant was constructed in the outskirts of Groningen, but became a part of the city due to expansion. The factory had 98 employees before it was closed in 2008 due to a reduction in demand. As of 2017, Vierverlaten sugar factory in Hoogkerk remains the only beet sugar production plant in the city. Other notable companies from Groningen include publishing company Noordhoff Uitgevers, tobacco company Niemeyer, cooperative health insurance company Menzis, distillery Hooghoudt, and natural gas companies GasUnie and GasTerra.

== Demographics ==
=== Immigration ===
City of Groningen population by country of origin (2020)
Country/territory	Population
Netherlands	175,249
Germany	6,427
Indonesia	5,847
(Netherlands) Dutch Caribbean	3,959
Suriname	3,401
Former Soviet Union	2,321
China	2,172
Turkey	1,774
United Kingdom	1,768
Italy	1,401
(Socialist Federal Republic of Yugoslavia) Yugoslavia	1,391
Morocco	1,266
Iran	1,157
Iraq	1,050
Other	11,992

As of 2020, Groningen had a total population of 232,874 people.

2020	Numbers	%
Dutch natives	175,249	75.2%
Western migration background	29,365	12.6%
Non-Western migration background	28,260	12.1%
Indonesia	5,847	2.51%
Netherlands Antilles and Aruba	3,959	1.7%
Suriname	3,401	1.46%
Turkey	1,774	0.76%
Morocco	1,266	0.54%
Total	232,874	100%

The Netherlands has attracted immigrants for centuries, in part due to the reputation of its society for tolerance. This included, in the 17th Century French Huguenots fleeing persecution in France; Belgians during WWI; and in the 1930s and 40s, Jews fleeing Germany and Austria.

In 1945 Indonesia, then a Dutch territory, declared independence, and in 1950 the Moluccan (now Malaku) islands declared independence from Indonesia, though this was ultimately unsuccessful. Subsequently a large contingent of Moluccan Soldiers found themselves unwelcome in Indonesia, and by agreement with the Dutch government, were accepted in the Netherlands. 3,500 Moluccan soldiers and their families arrived in the Netherlands in 1951. 250 of these were housed at Camp Nuis, a former labour camp close to Groningen. The camp was closed in 1961.

=== Religion ===
The majority of people in Groningen, slightly more than 70%, are non-religious. With 25.1%, the largest religion in Groningen is Christianity.

Religions in Groningen (2013)
1. No affiliation (71.7%)
2. Protestant Church in the Netherlands (14.1%)
3. Roman Catholic (6.30%)
4. Other Christian denominations (4.70%)
5. Islam (2.10%)
6. Hinduism (0.60%)
7. Buddhism (0.30%)
8. Judaism (0.20%)

=== Population growth ===
Historical population
Year	Pop.	±% p.a.
1400	5,000	—
1560	12,500	+0.57%
1600	16,600	+0.71%
1721	20,680	+0.18%
1770	23,296	+0.24%
1787	22,000	−0.34%
1795	23,770	+0.97%
Source: Lourens & Lucassen 1997, pp. 30–31

Historical population
Year	Pop.	±%
1950	160,709	—
1960	171,318	+6.6%
1970	190,983	+11.5%
1980	187,342	−1.9%
1990	192,896	+3.0%
2000	198,955	+3.1%
2010	213,241	+7.2%
2020	232,874	+9.2%
Source: Statistics Netherlands

The municipality of Groningen has grown rapidly. In 1968 it expanded by mergers with Hoogkerk and Noorddijk, and in 2019 it merged with Haren and Ten Boer.

All historical data are for the original city limits, excluding Hoogkerk, Noorddijk, Haren and Ten Boer.

It has a land area of 168.93 km^{2} (65.22 sq mi), and a total area, including water, of 180.21 km^{2} (69.58 sq mi). Its population density is 1,367 residents per km^{2} (3,540 per square mile). On 1 January 2019, it was merged with the municipalities of Ten Boer and Haren. The Groningen-Assen metropolitan area has about half a million inhabitants.

== Culture ==
Groningen is nationally known as the "Metropolis of the North". The city is regarded as the main urban centre of the Northern part of the country, particularly in the fields of education, business, music and other arts. It is also known as "Martinistad", referring to the tower of the Martinitoren, which is named after Groningen's patron saint Martin of Tours. The large student population also contributes to the very diverse cultural scene for a city of its size.

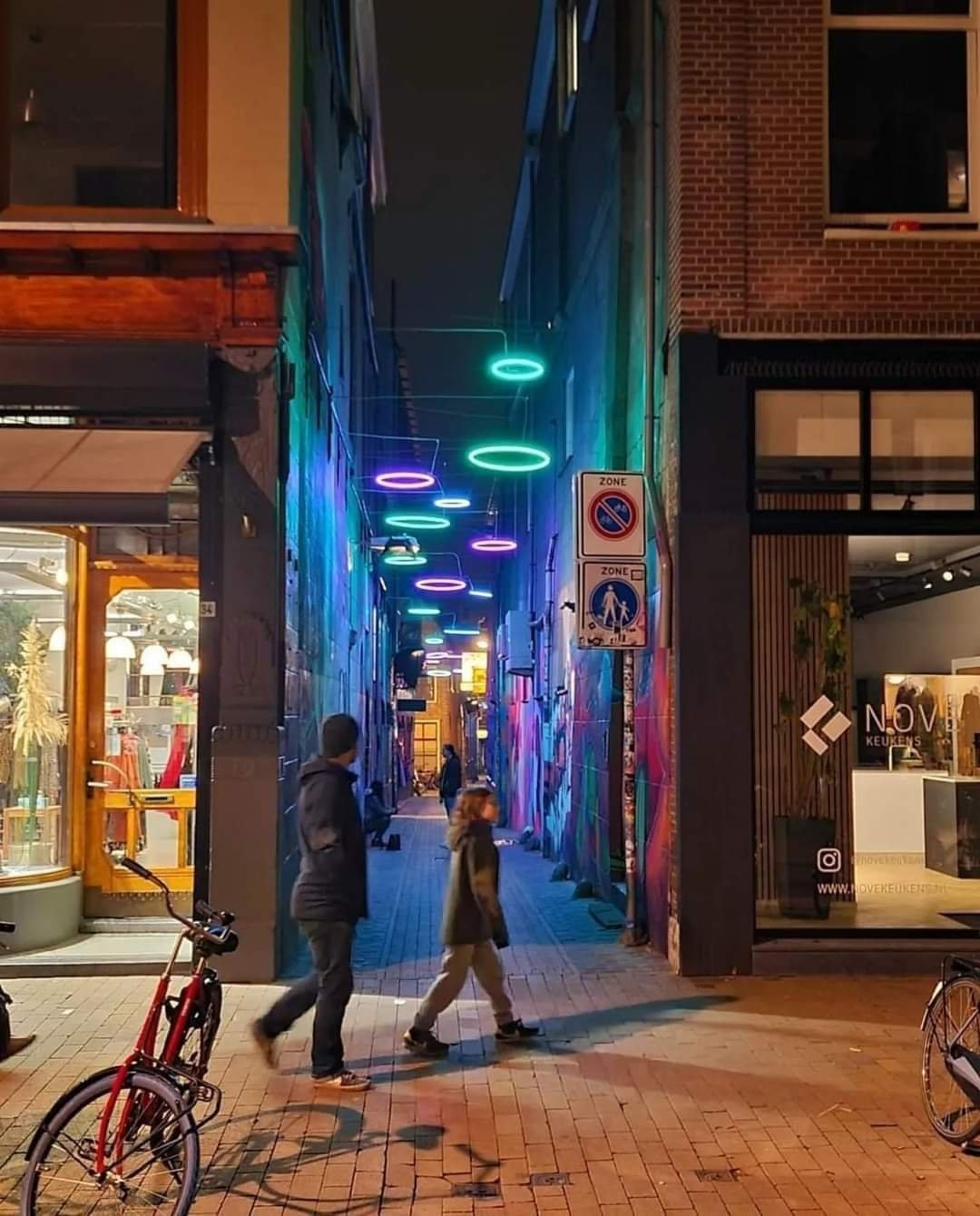
Papengang with light art installation

Since 2016 Groningen has been host of the International Cycling Film Festival, an annual film festival for bicycle related films. It takes place in the art house cinema of the old Roman Catholic Hospital.

The first major international chess tournament after World War II was held in Groningen in 1946. The tournament, won by Mikhail Botvinnik of the USSR, was the first time the Soviet Union had sent a team to a foreign event. An international chess "Schaakfestival Groningen tournament" has been held in the city in most years since 1946.

=== Museums ===
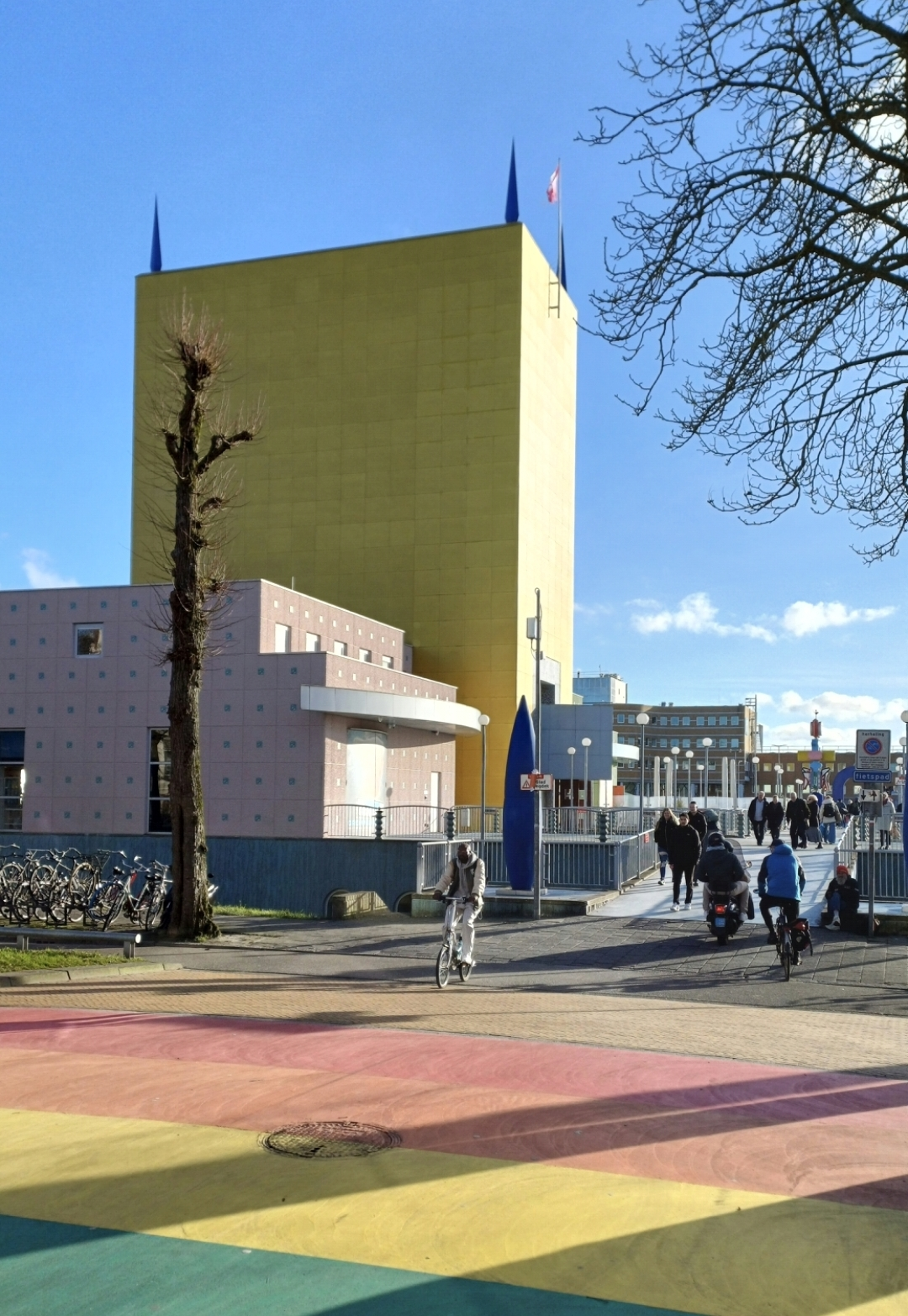
Groninger Museum 2024

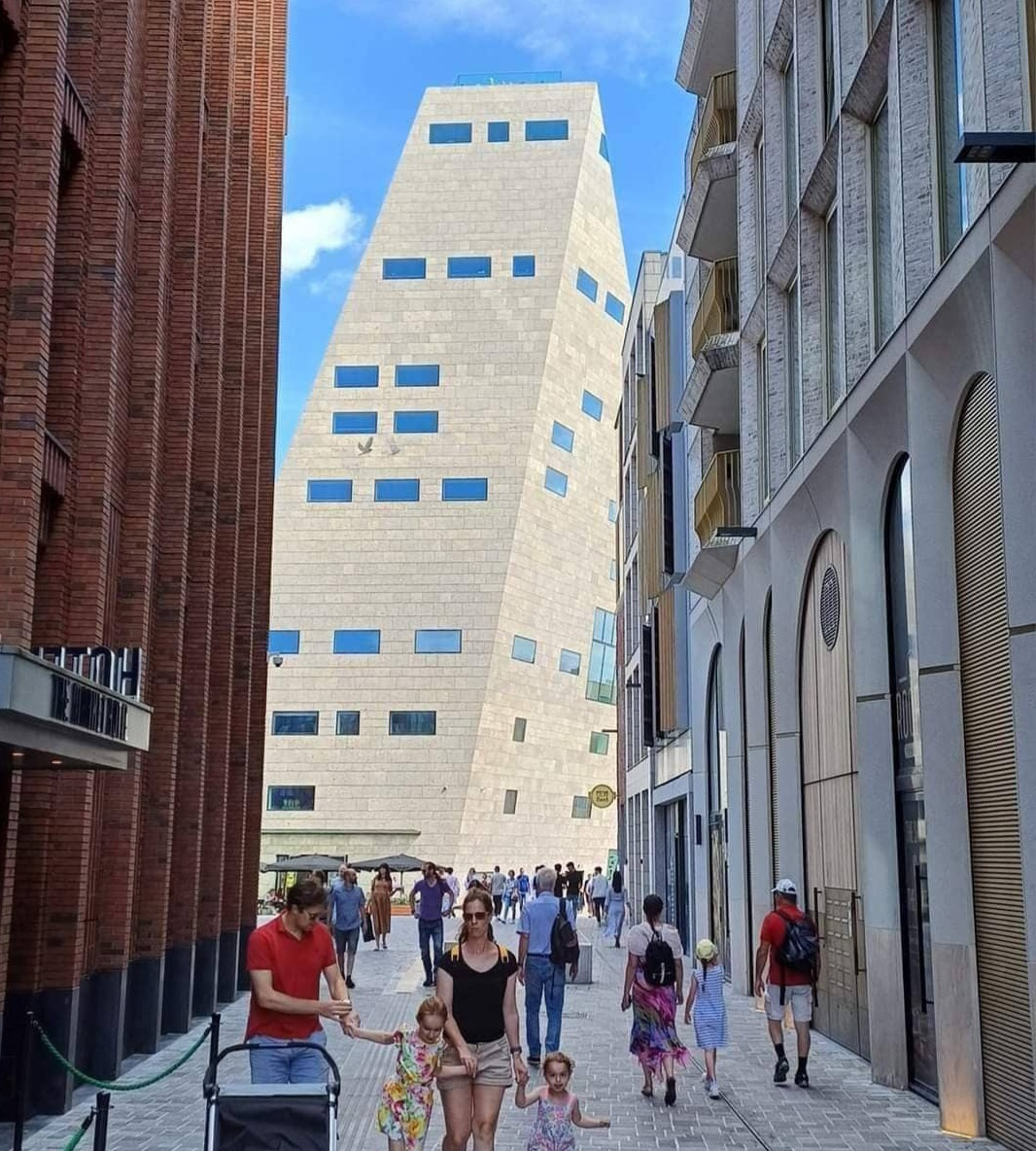
Forum Groningen

Groningen is home to the Groninger Museum. Its new building designed by Alessandro Mendini in 1994 echoes the Italian post-modern concepts and is notable for its futuristic and colourful style. The city has a university museum and a museum about comics, games and animation named Storyworld. Groningen is also the home of Noorderlicht, an international photographic platform that runs a photo gallery and organizes an international photo festival. The Forum Groningen that opened in 2019 is a cultural center consisting of a museum, art-house cinema, library, restaurant and bars, rooftop terrace and a tourist information and many more.

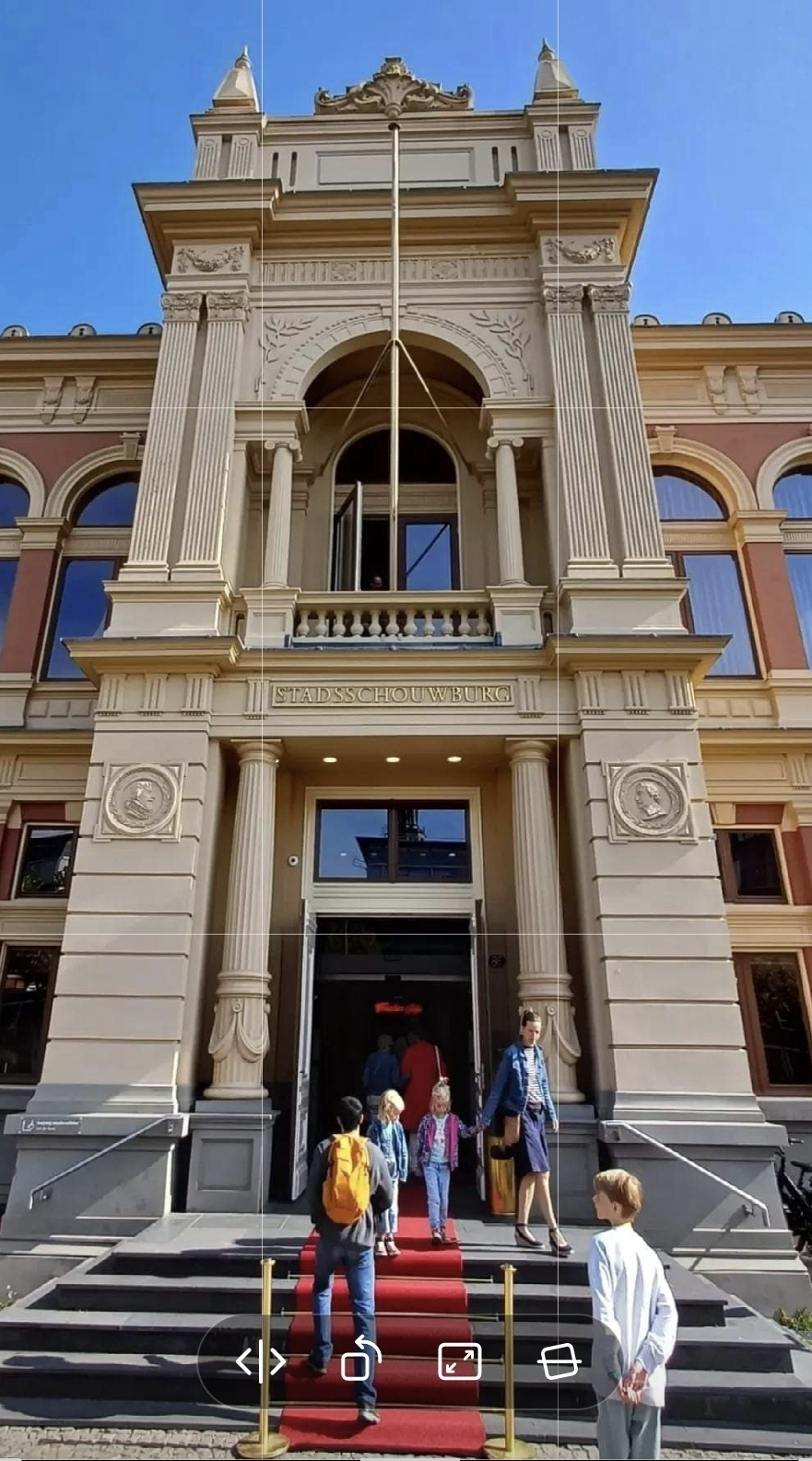
Stadsschouwburg Groningen

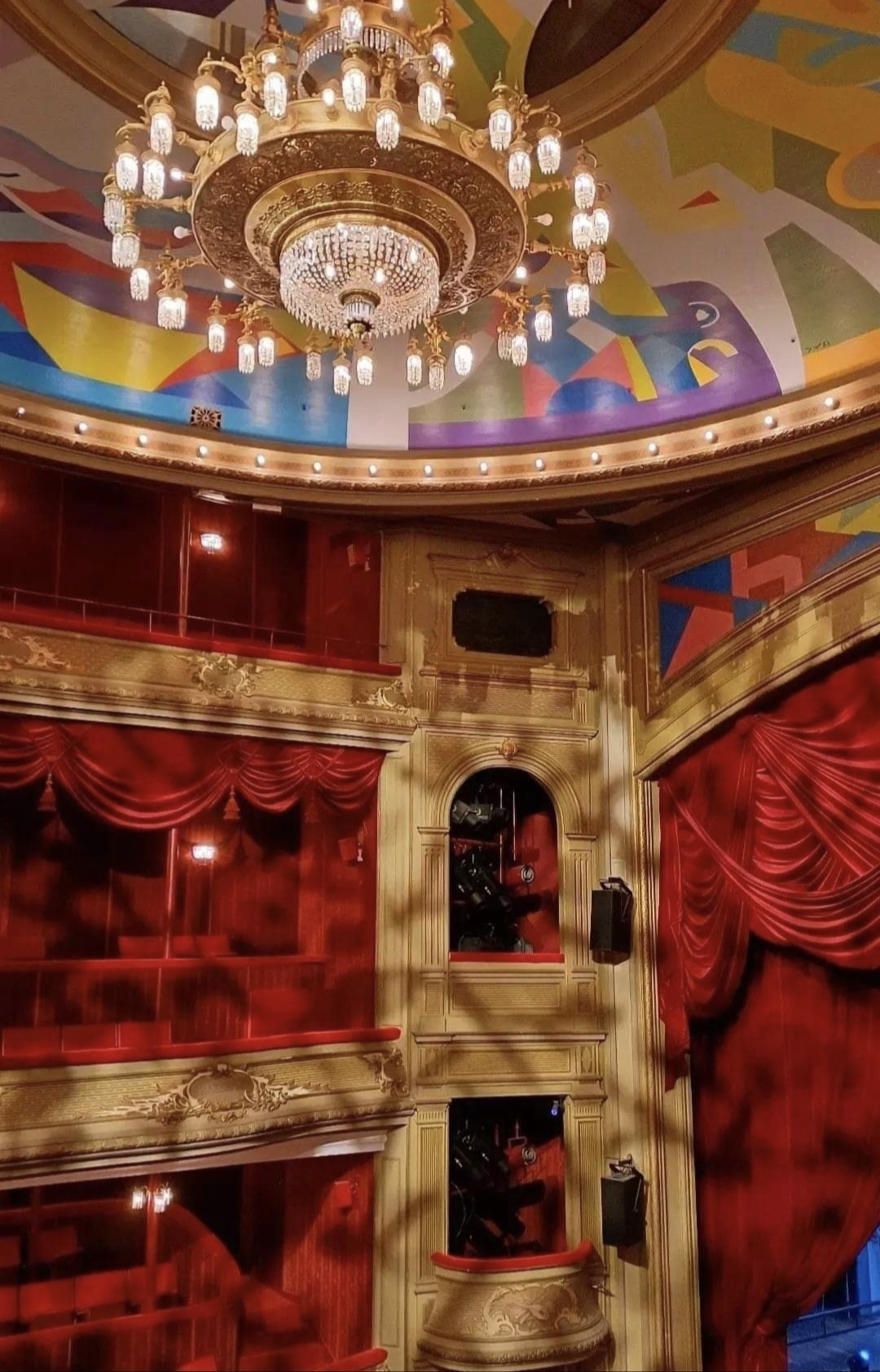

Groningen has a city theatre called the Stadsschouwburg, located on the Turfsingel, a theatre and concert venue called Martini Plaza, and a cultural venue on the Trompsingel, called the Oosterpoort. Vera is located on the Oosterstraat, the Grand Theatre on the Grote Markt, and Simplon on the Boterdiep. Several cafés feature live music, a few of which specialize in jazz music, including the Jazzcafe De Spieghel on the Peperstraat. Groningen is the host city for Eurosonic Noorderslag, an annual music showcase event for bands from across Europe.

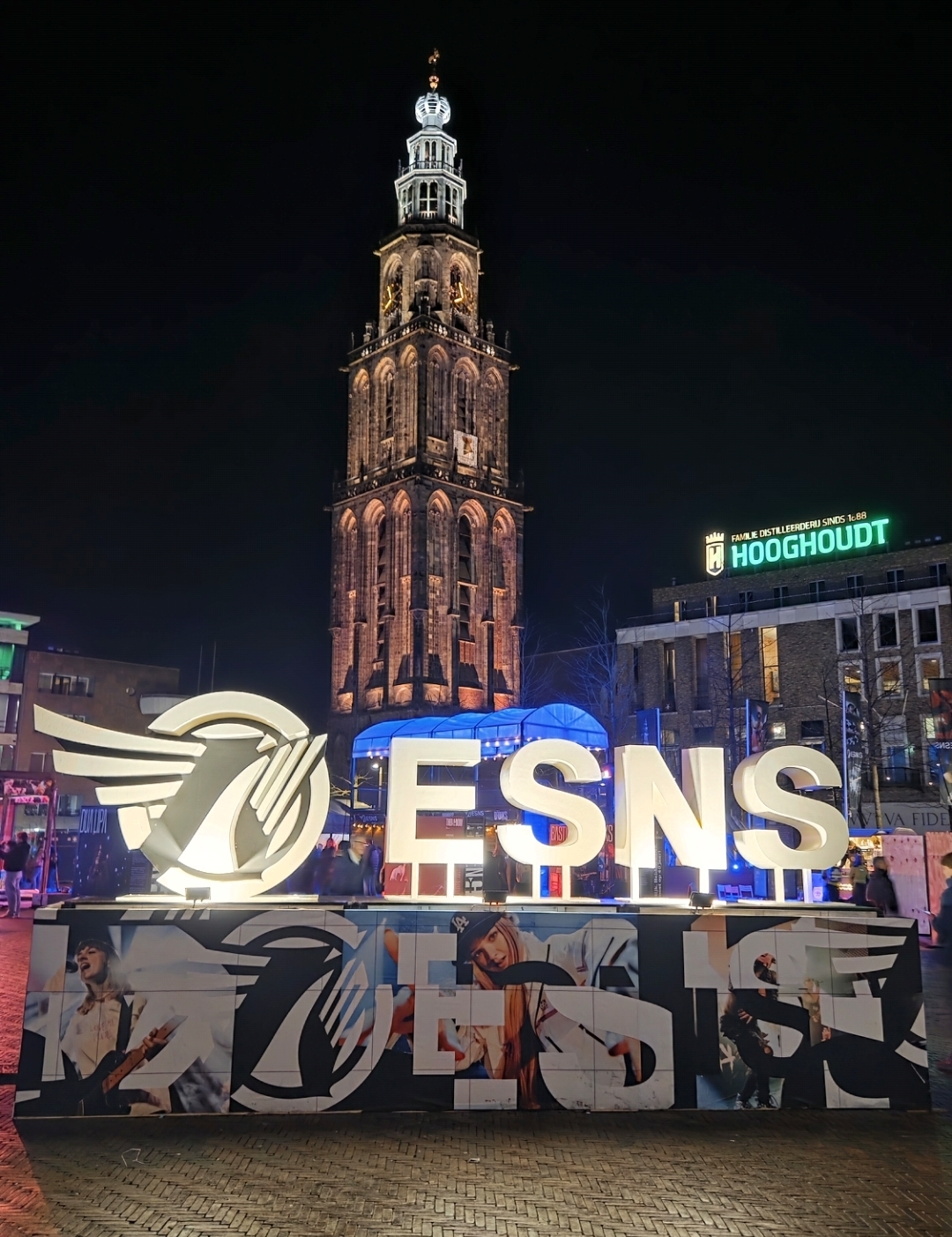
Eurosonic Noorderslag

=== Nightlife ===
Groningen's active nightlife depends largely on its student population, with the Grote Markt, Vismarkt, Poelestraat and Peperstraat crowded nightly, most bars not closing until five in the morning. From 2005 to 2007, Groningen was named "best city centre" of the Netherlands. Groningen has a red-light district, called Nieuwstad.

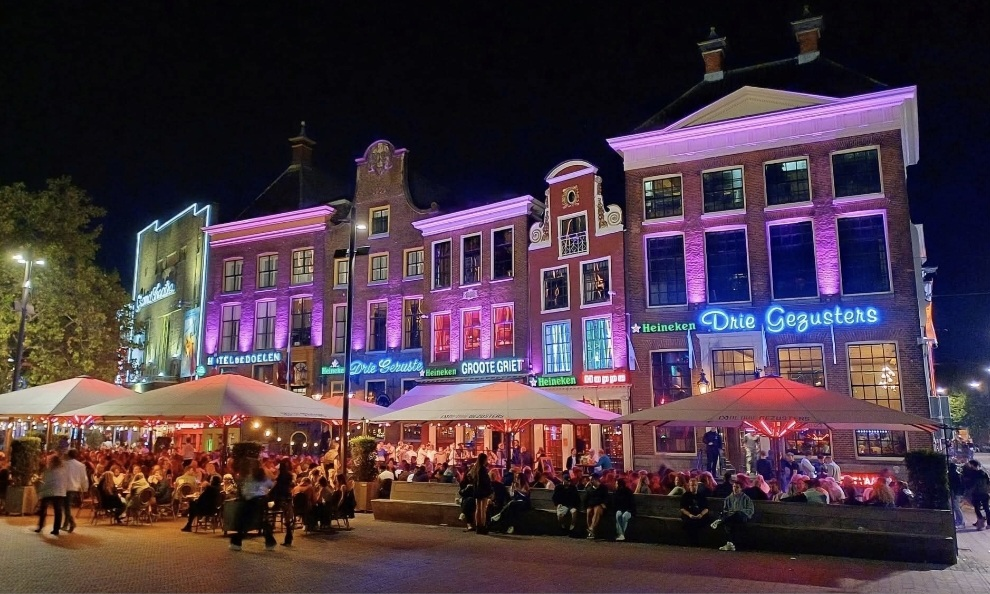
De Drie Gezusters Groningen

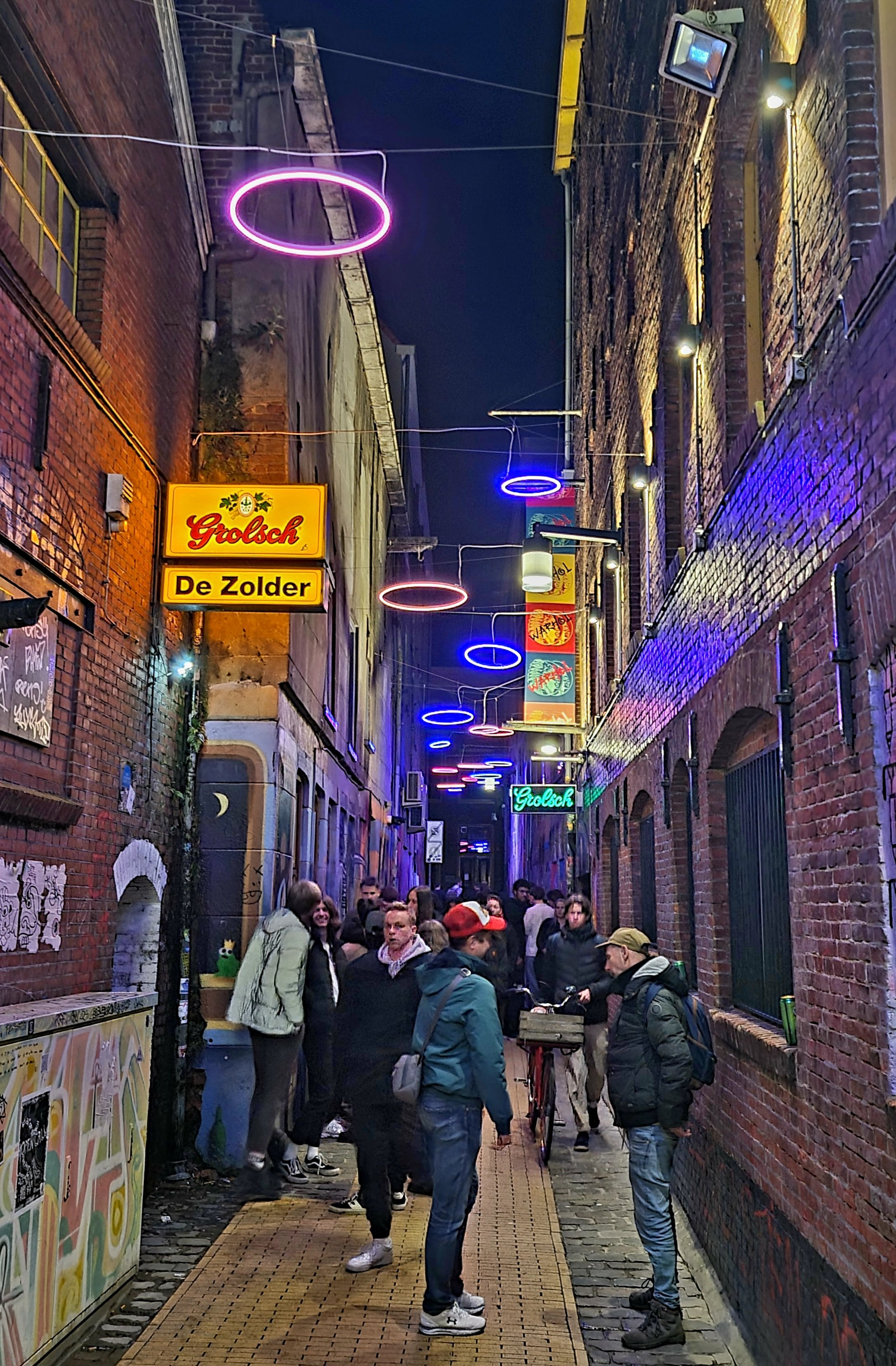
Papengang is an old alley with bars

=== Sports ===
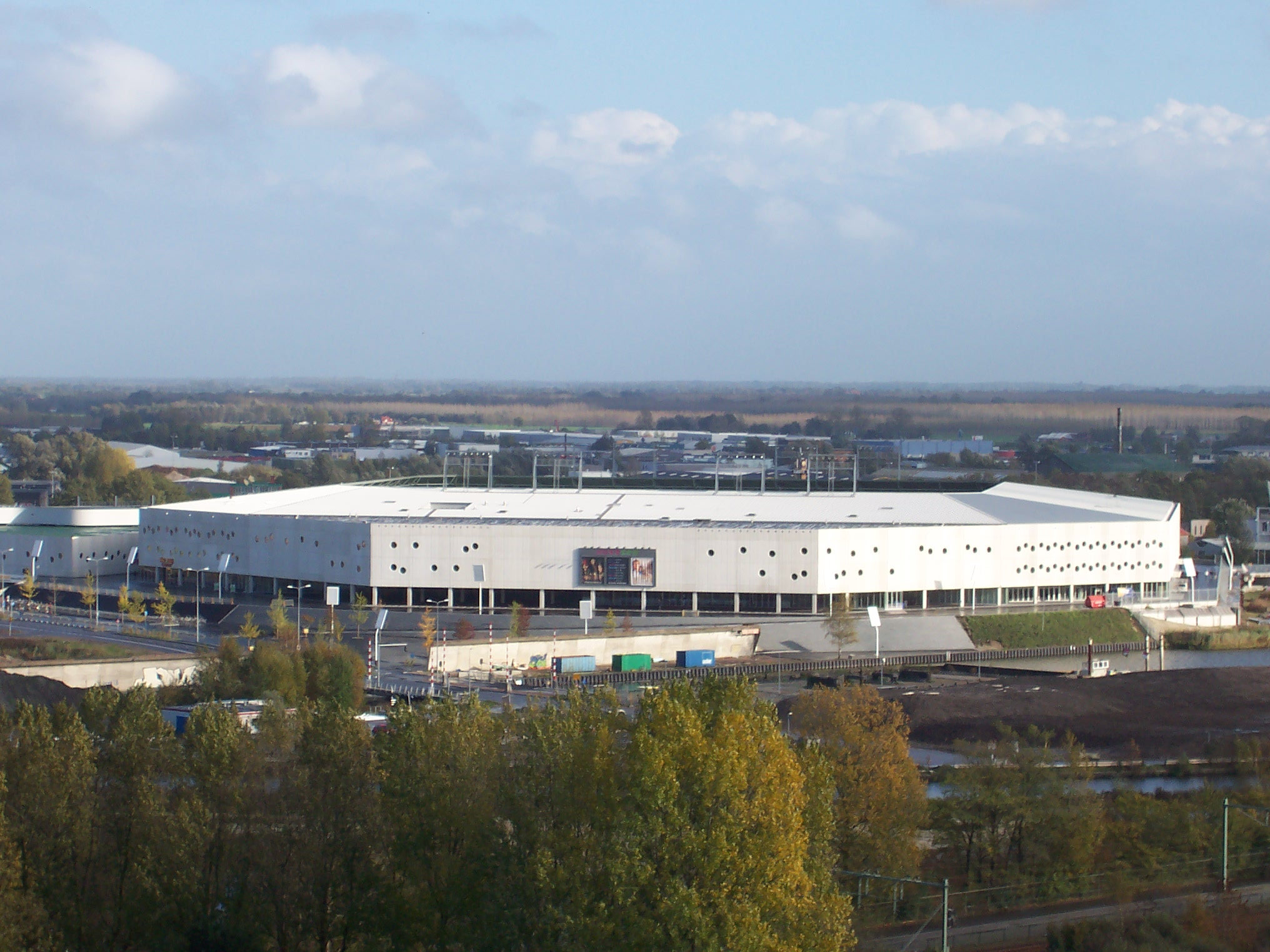
The Euroborg football stadium

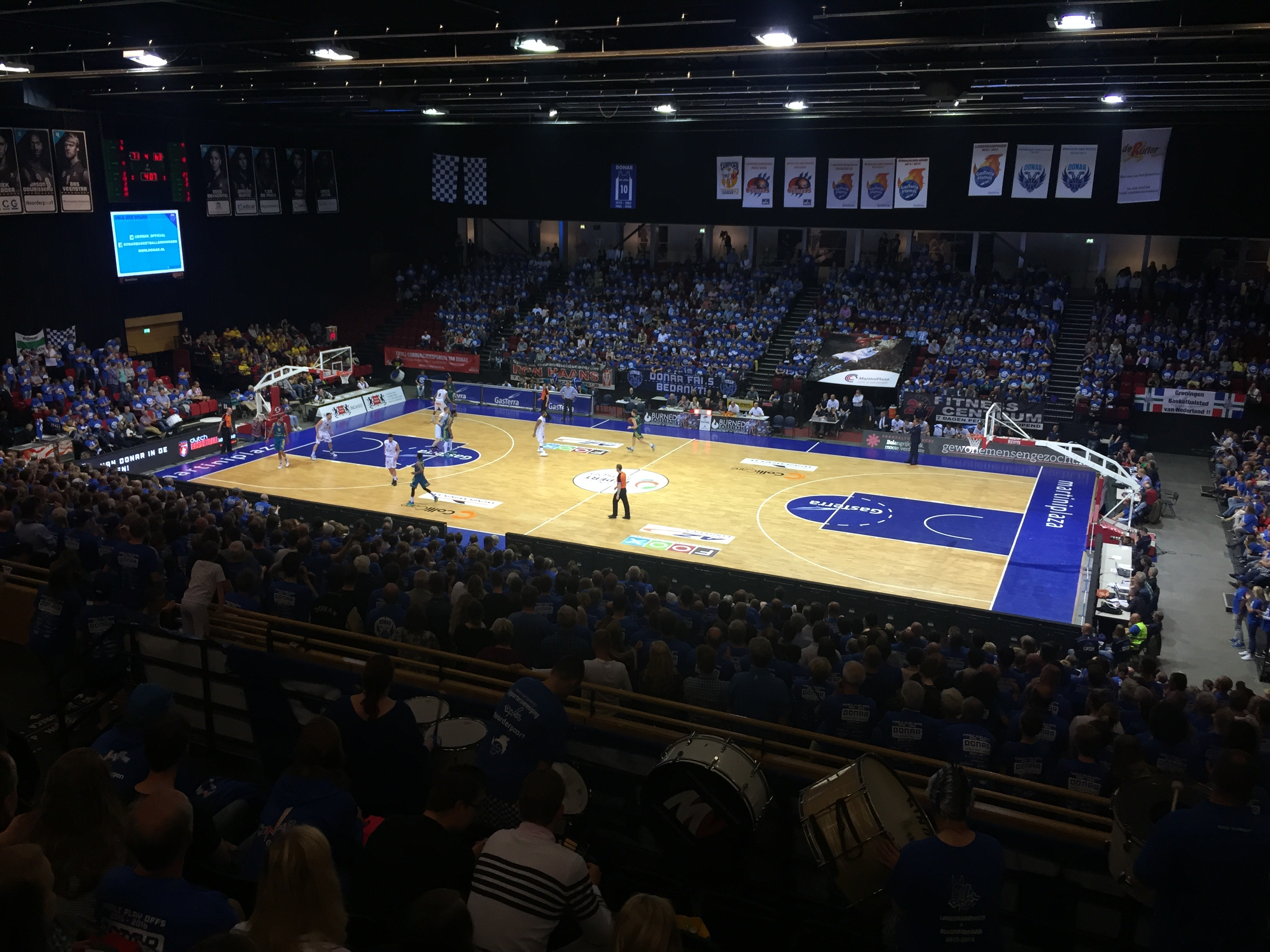
A Donar basketball game in MartiniPlaza

FC Groningen, founded in 1971, is the local football club, as of 2026 they play in the Eredivisie, the highest football league of the Netherlands. Winners of the KNVB Cup in the 2014–15 season, their best Eredivisie result was in the 1990–91 season when they finished third. Their current stadium which opened in January 2006 has 22,525 seats. It is called the Hitachi Capital Mobility Stadion; it was known as the "Euroborg stadium" before 2016, and "Noordlease Stadion" from 2016 to 2018.

American sports are fairly popular in Groningen; it has American football, baseball, and basketball clubs. Groningen's professional basketball club Donar play in the highest professional league, the Dutch Basketball League, and have won the national championship seven times. The Groningen Giants are the American football team of the city who play in the premier league of the AFBN and are nicknamed as the "Kings of the North".

The running event called 4 Miles of Groningen takes place in the city on the second Sunday of October every year with over 23,000 participants. The 2002 Giro d'Italia began in Groningen, including the prologue and the start of the first stage. The city hosted the start and finish of the fifth stage of the 2013 Energiewacht Tour.

== Education ==
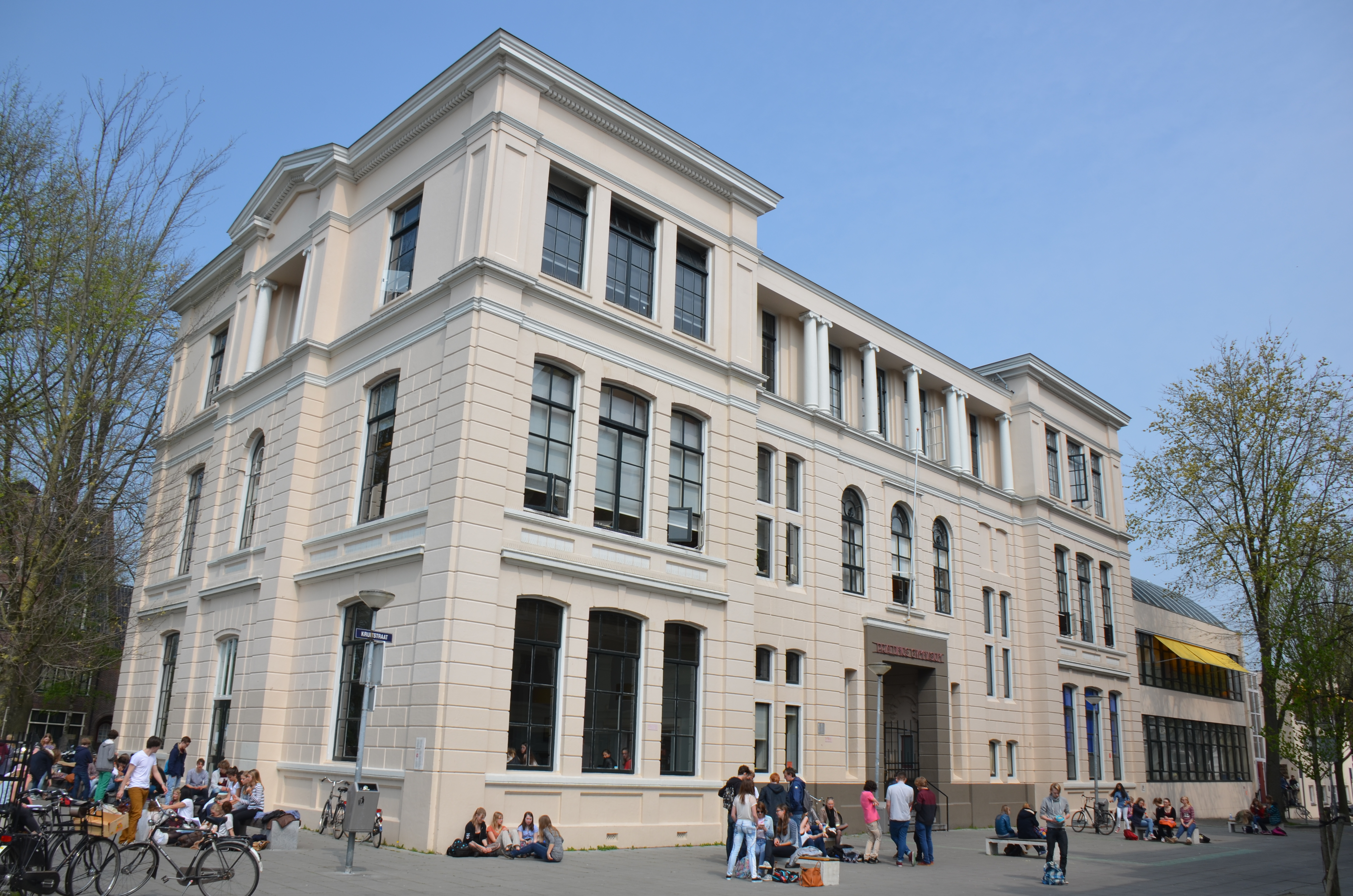
Praedinius Gymnasium in Groningen is one of the two gymnasium schools in the city.

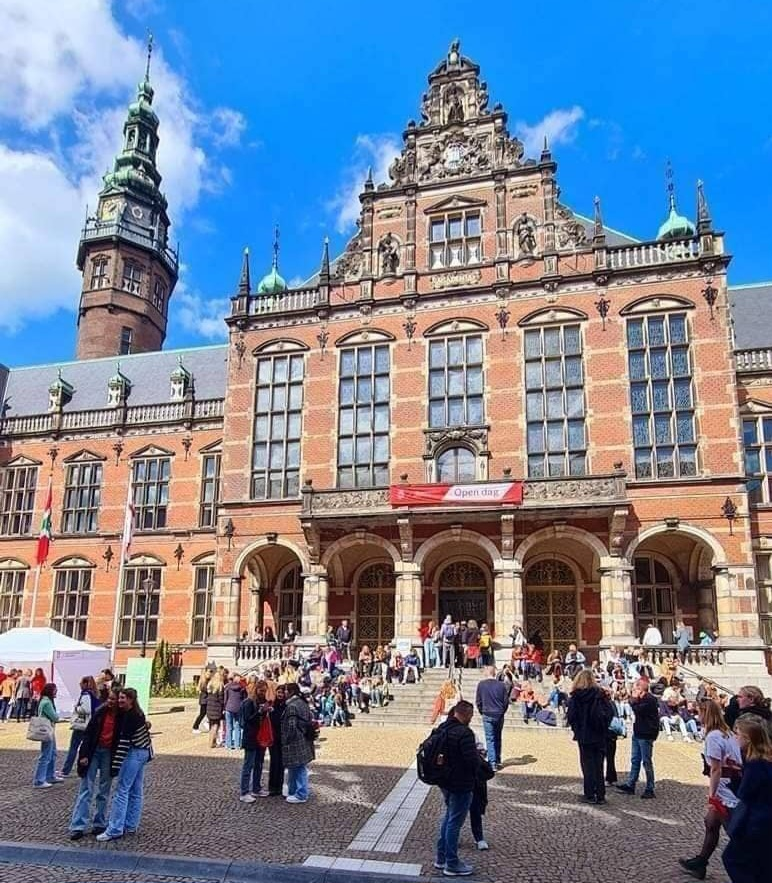
Academybuilding Rijksuniversiteit Groningen

As of 2020, around 25% of the 230,000 inhabitants in Groningen are students. The city has the highest density of students and the lowest mean age in the Netherlands.

There are also Middle Schools, such as H.N. Werkman College

The University of Groningen (in Dutch: Rijksuniversiteit Groningen), established in 1614 is the second oldest university in the Netherlands (after the University of Leiden). The university educated the country's first female student, Aletta Jacobs, the first Dutch national astronaut, Wubbo Ockels, the first president of the European Central Bank, Wim Duisenberg, and two Nobel laureates; Heike Kamerlingh Onnes (in Physics) and Ben Feringa (in Chemistry). The university has about 31,000 students 22% of whom are international.

The Hanze University of Applied Sciences (in Dutch: Hanzehogeschool Groningen) was founded in 1986 and is more focused on the practical application of knowledge, offering bachelor and master courses in fields like Electrical and Electronic Engineering, Communication and Multimedia Design, and Renewable Energy. With around 8.1% international students, Hanze hosts more than 28,000 students and is one of the largest universities of applied sciences by enrollment in the Netherlands.

== Politics ==
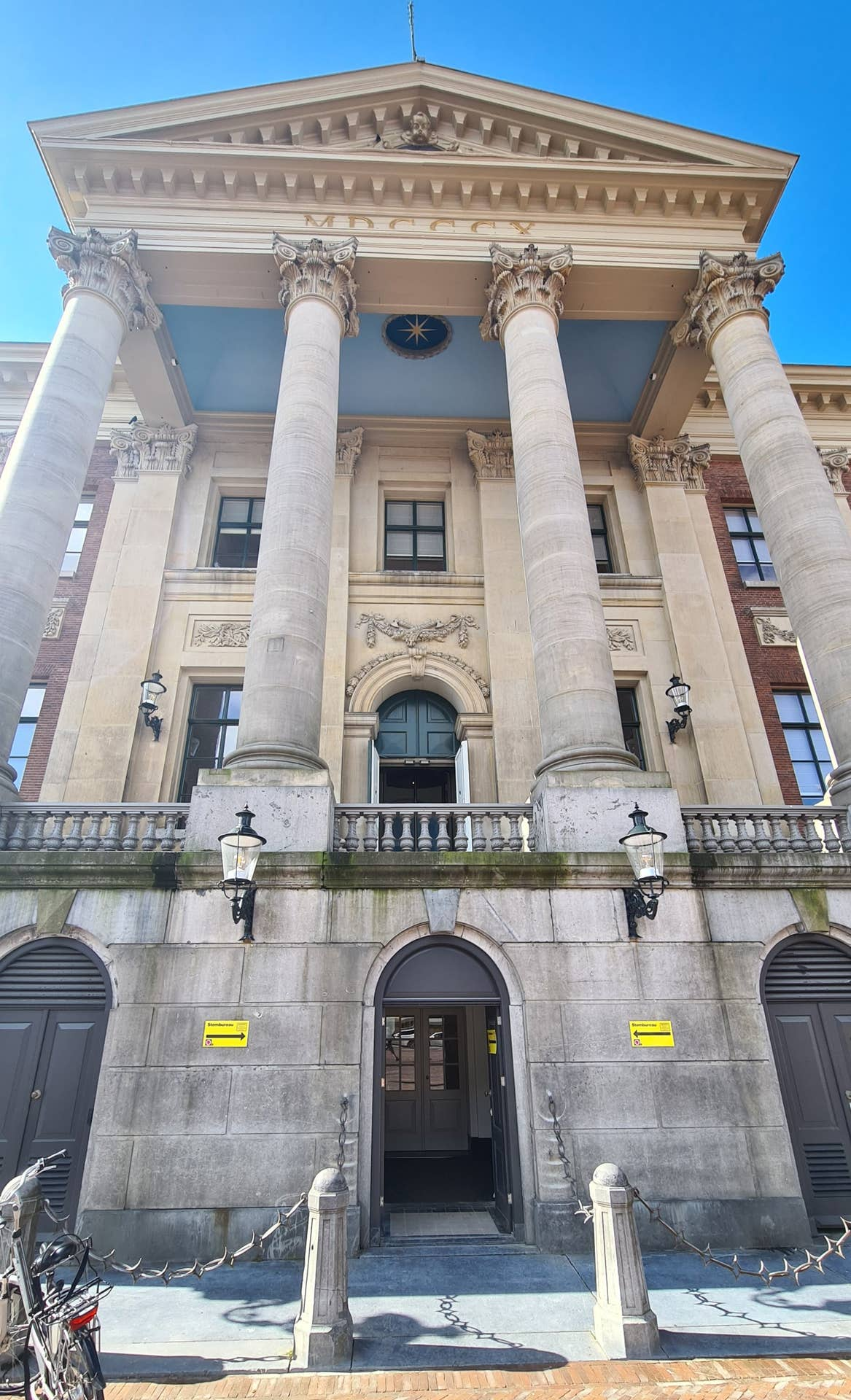
City Hall

The Groningen municipal council has 45 members which, after the 2026 local elections, was made up as follows:

Groningen municipal council
Party name	Seats
GroenLinks/PvdA (Pro)	13
D66	6
VVD	4
Party for the Animals	4
Student en Stad	3
Christian Democratic Appeal	3
Stadspartij 100% voor Groningen	3
Socialist Party	3
Christian Union	2
Forum for Democracy	1
Party for the North	1
Party for Freedom	1
Volt	1

From 2026, the ruling municipal coalition consisted of Pro, Party for the Animals, CDA, Socialist Party and ChristenUnie.

=== International relations ===
Groningen is twinned with the following cities:

- (United Kingdom) Newcastle-Upon-Tyne, England, UK
- Odense, Denmark
- Oldenburg, Germany
- Graz, Austria
- Zlín, Czech Republic
- Katowice, Poland
- Tallinn, Estonia
- Kaliningrad, Russia
- Murmansk, Russia
- (United States) Holland, Michigan, US
- San Carlos, Nicaragua
- Tianjin, China

Groningen also has a trilateral partnership with the nearby northern German cities of Bremen and Oldenburg.

== Transport ==
=== Cycling and walking ===
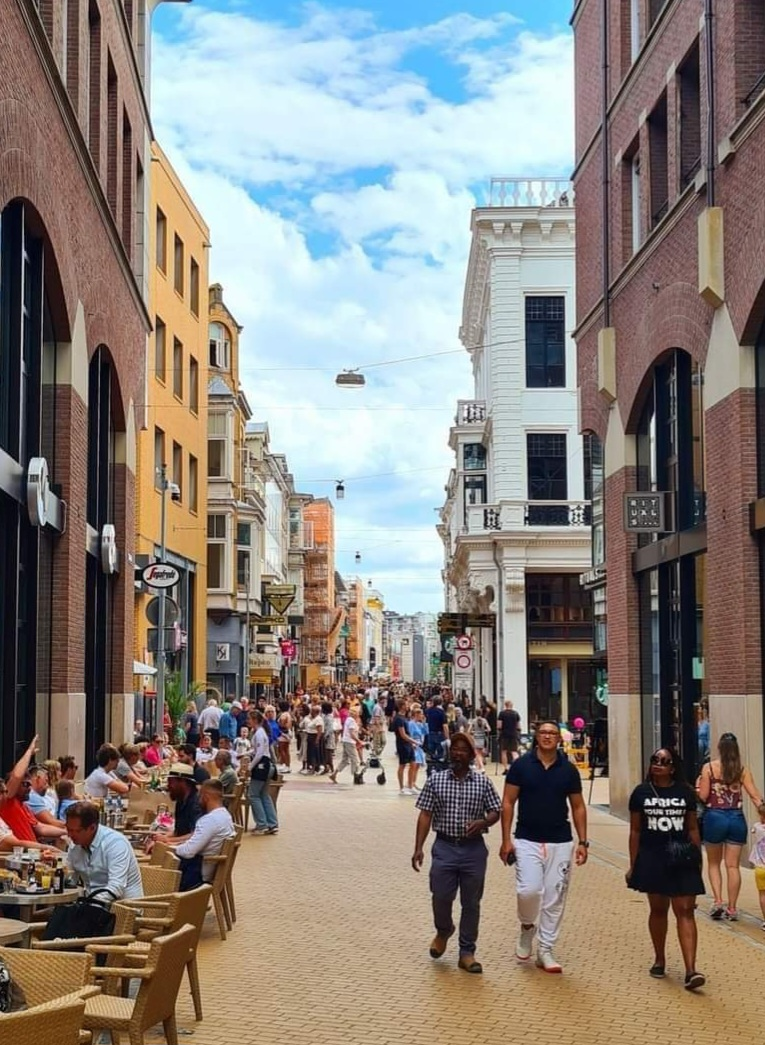
Herestraat the main shopping street

Groningen is known as the "World Cycling City"; around 57% of its residents use a bicycle for regular commute within the city. In 2000, Groningen was chosen as the Fietsstad 2002, the top cycle-city in the Netherlands for 2002. Similar to most Dutch cities, Groningen has developed to accommodate a large number of cyclists. An extensive network of bike paths were planned to make it more convenient to cycle to various destinations instead of taking a car.

The city has cycle-paths, public transport, and a large pedestrianised zone in the city centre. Groningen's city centre was remodeled into a "pedestrian priority zone" to promote walking and biking. This was achieved by applying the principle of filtered permeability—the network configuration favours active transportation and selectively "filters out" traveling by car by reducing the number of streets that run through the centre. The pedestrianised streets connect to a network across the entire centre. In addition, these paths go through public squares and open spaces, increasing aesthetic appeal and encouraging participation. The logic of filtering a mode of transport is expressed in a comprehensive model for laying out neighbourhoods and districts—the fused grid.

=== Public transport ===
==== Trains ====
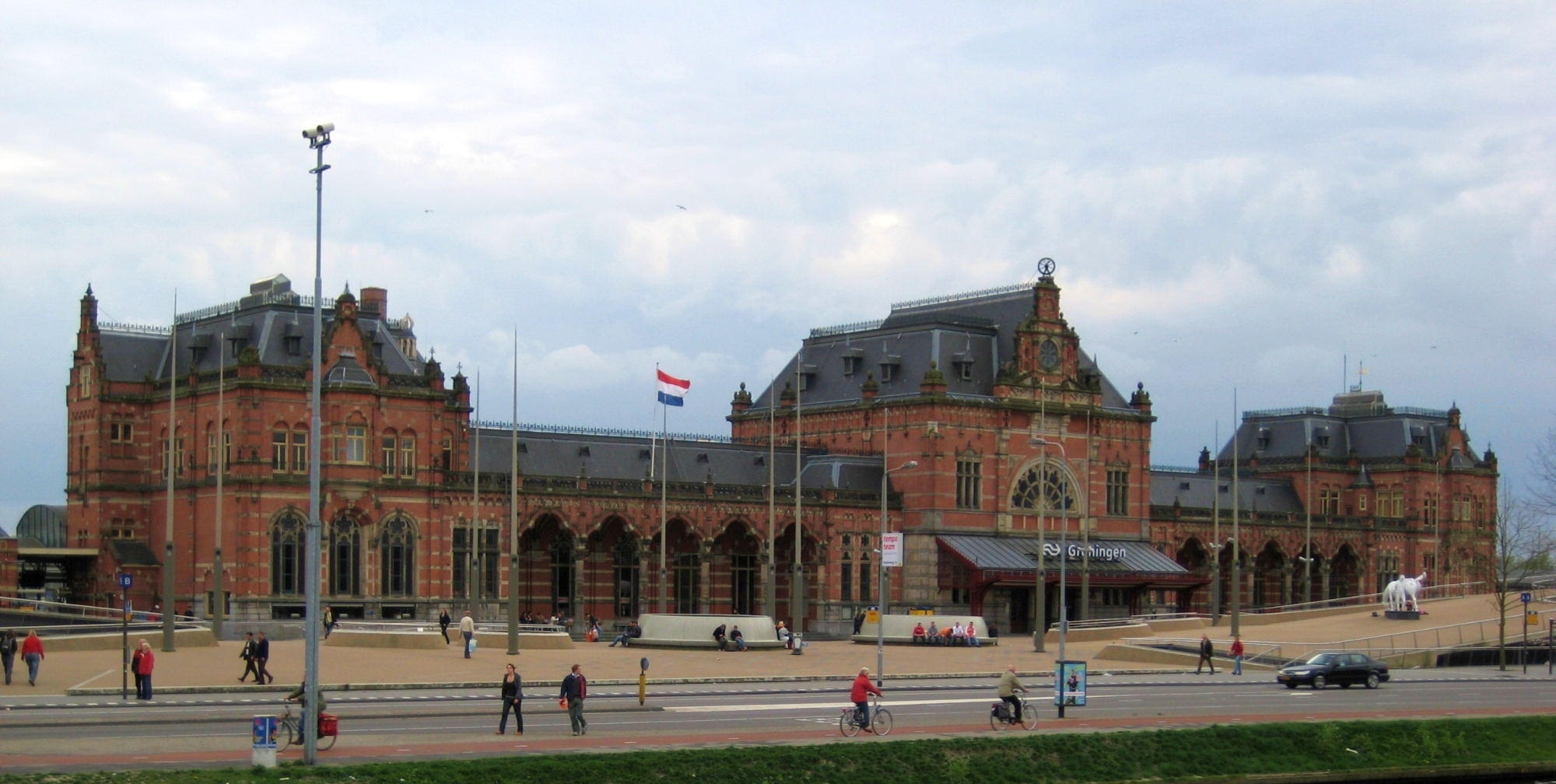
Railway station Groningen (2008)

Groningen railway station (in Dutch: Hoofdstation) is the main railway station and has regular services to most of the major cities in the country.

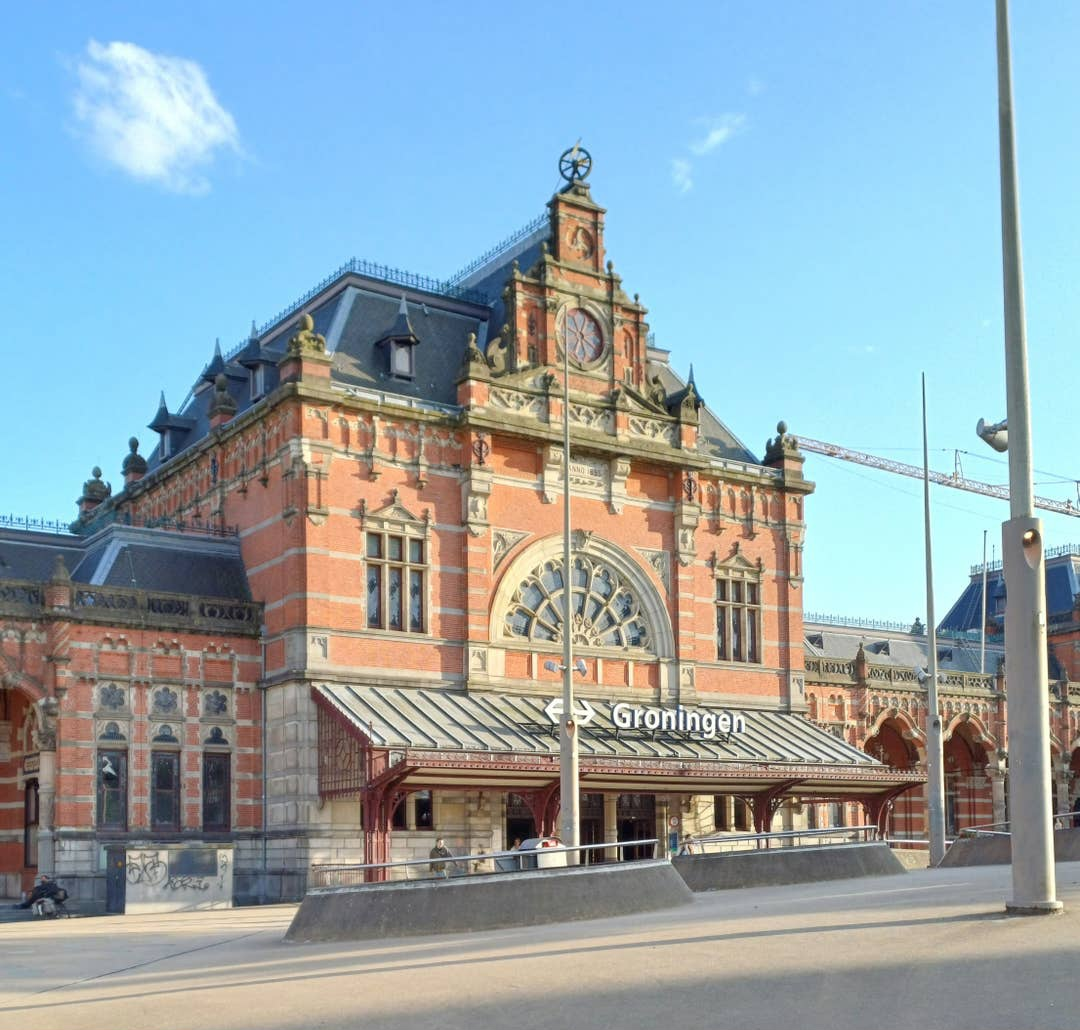
Entrance Hoofdstation Groningen

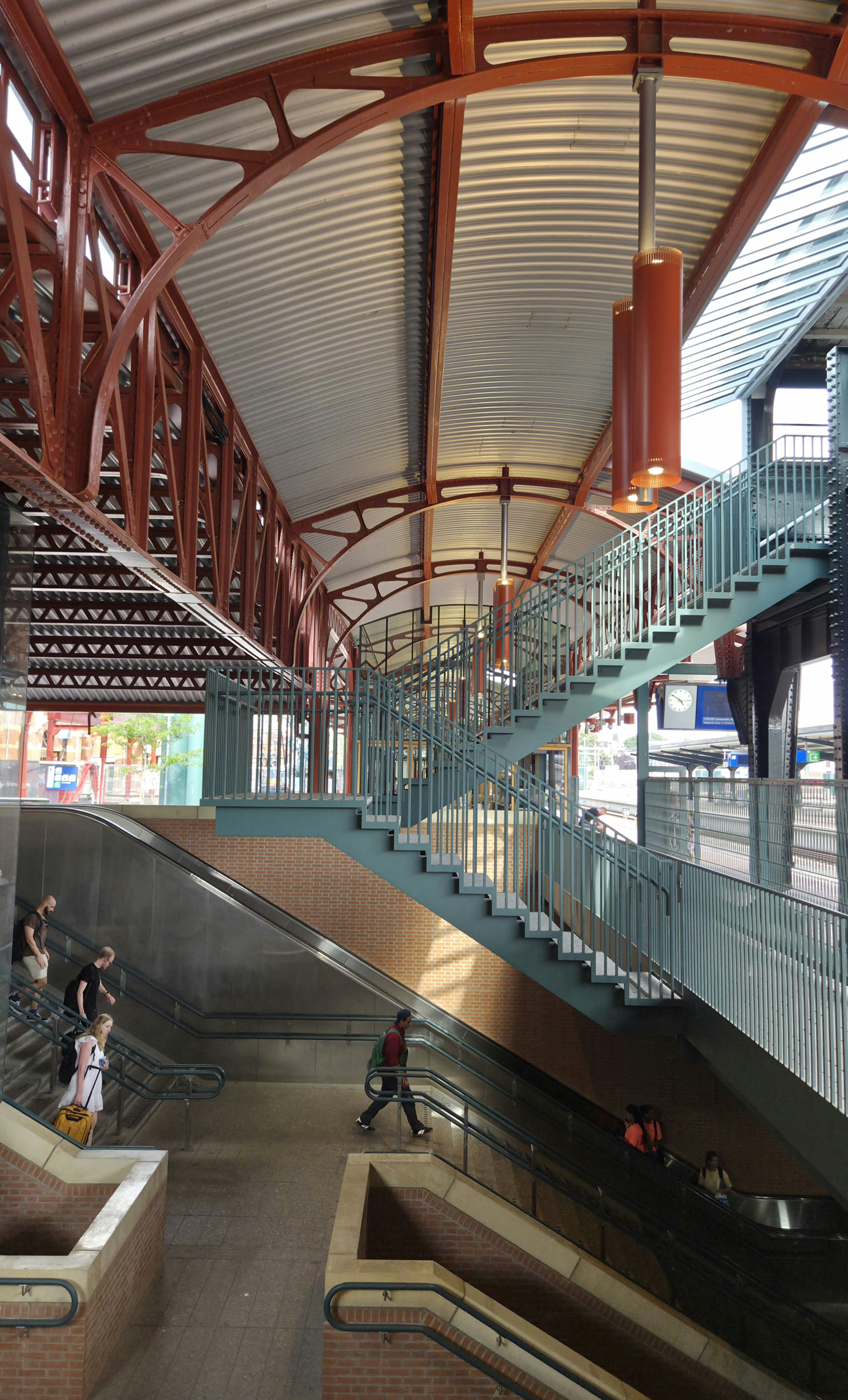
Stairs to the platforms

The city's remaining two railway stations are Europapark and Noord.

Groningen has six railway routes:

- Groningen – Delfzijl
- Groningen – Roodeschool / Eemshaven
- Groningen – Leeuwarden
- Groningen – Veendam
- Groningen – Weener / Leer
- Groningen – Meppel / Zwolle

On those six routes, ten lines stop at:

- Groningen – Groningen North – Sauwerd – Bedum – Stedum – Loppersum – Appingedam – Delfzijl West – Delfzijl
- Groningen – Groningen North – Sauwerd – Winsum – Baflo – Warffum – Usquert – Uithuizen – Uithuizermeeden – Roodeschool – (Low Service) Eemshaven
- Groningen – Zuidhorn – Grijpskerk – Buitenpost – De Westereen – Feanwâlden – Hurdegaryp – Leeuwarden Camminghaburen – Leeuwarden
- Groningen – Buitenpost – Leeuwarden
- Groningen – Groningen Europapark – Kropswolde – Martenshoek – Hoogezand-Sappemeer – Zuidbroek – Veendam
- Groningen – Groningen Europapark – Kropswolde – Martenshoek – Hoogezand-Sappemeer – Zuidbroek – Scheemda – Winschoten – (lower service) Bad Nieuweschans – Weener (Due to a broken bridge, trains do not go on to Leer. Take a bus from Groningen or Weener.)
- Groningen – Groningen Europapark – Haren – Assen – Beilen – Hoogeveen – Meppel – Zwolle
- Groningen – Assen – Zwolle – Amersfoort Centraal – Utrecht Centraal – Gouda – Rotterdam Alexander – Rotterdam Centraal
- Groningen – Assen – Zwolle – Lelystad Centrum – Almere Centrum – Amsterdam South – Schiphol – Leiden Centraal – Den Haag Centraal / The Hague Centraal

==== Buses ====
Groningen has bus lines and Q-Link—a network of buses similar to a tram/metro network.

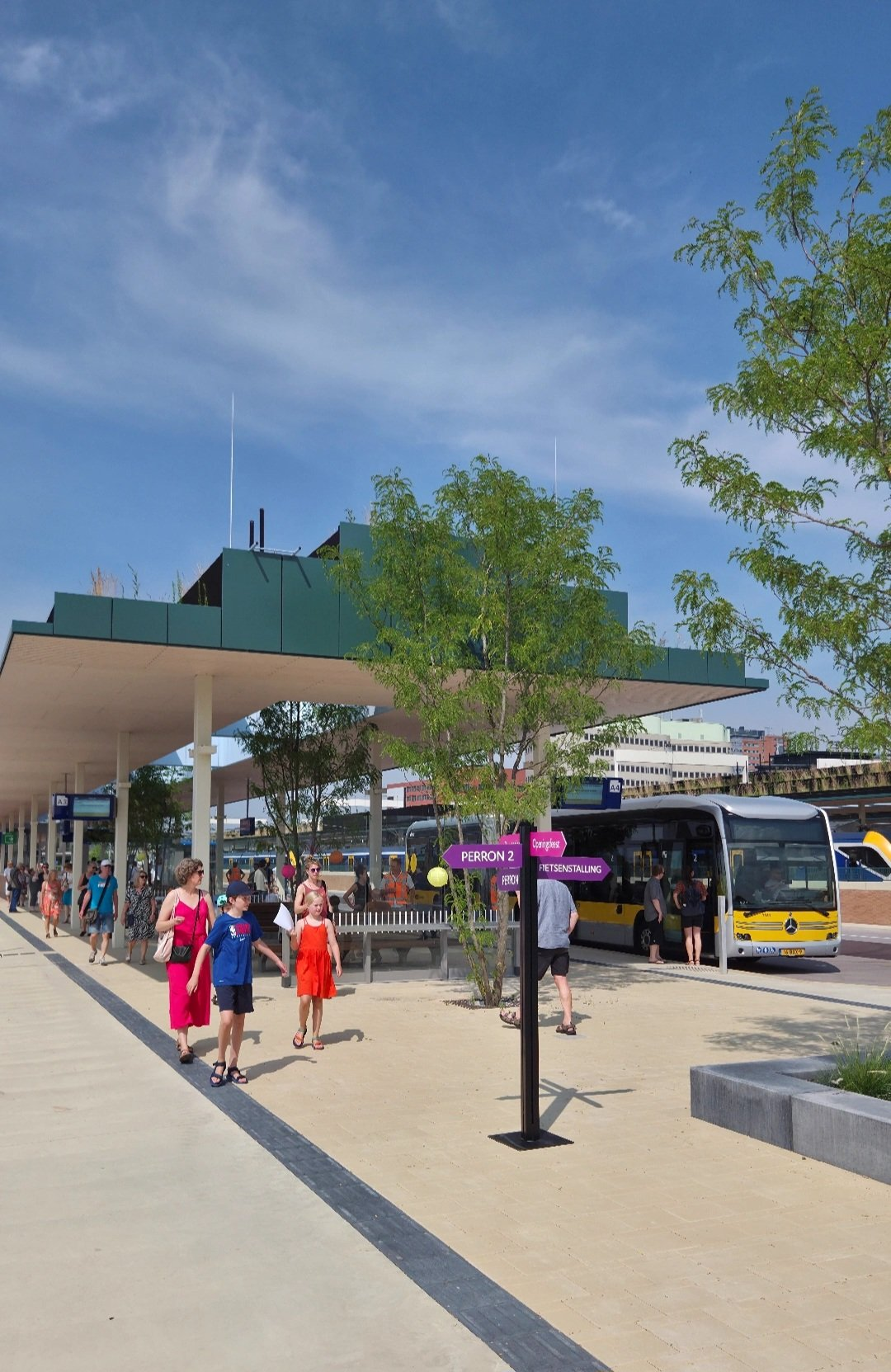
Busstation Groningen

City & Q-Link lines:

- 1: Main Station – City Center – UMCG North – Station Groningen North – Zernike – P+R Reitdiep
- 2: Groningen Europapark – UMCG Main Entrance – UMCG North – Station Groningen North – Zernike – Station Zuidhorn
- 3: Lewenborg – P+R Kardinge – Main Station – P+R Hoogkerk – Leek
- 4: Beijum – P+R Kardinge – Main Station – P+R Hoogkerk – Peize – Roden
- 5: Harkstede – P+R Meerstad – UMCG Main Entrance – City Centre – Main Station – P+R Haren – Zuidlaren – Annen
- 6: P+R Haren – Main Station – UMCG Main Entrance – Ten Boer – Appingedam – Delfzijl
- 7: Main Station – Westerhaven – Vinkhuizen – Paddepoel
- 8: P+R Hoogkerk – Hoogkerk – Westerhaven – Main Station – De Wijert – Groningen Europapark
- 9: Eelde – Paterswolde – Martini hospital – Corpus den Hoorn – De Wijert – Main Station – Westerhaven – Paddepoel – Zernike
- 10: P+R Hoogkerk – Martini hospital – Corpus den Hoorn – De Wijert – Main Station – Korrewegwijk – Selwerd – Station Groningen North
- 15: Main Station – Paddepoel – Zernike
- 18: P+R Hoogkerk – Vinkhuizen – Paddepoel – Zernike
- 19: Main Station – Westerhaven – Paddepoel

Q-Liner lines:

- 300: Groningen – P+R Westlaren (Zuidlaren) – P+R Gieten – P+R Borger – Emmen
- 304: Groningen – P+R Hoogkerk – Drachten
- 309: Groningen – Assen Busstation Marsdijk – Kloosterveen
- 312: Groningen – P+R Haren – P+R Annen – P+R Gieten – Gasselte – Stadskanaal
- 314: Groningen – Drachten
- 315: Groningen – Heerenveen – Emmeloord
- 324: Groningen – Emmeloord

Night lines:

- 404: Groningen – P+R Hoogkerk – Marum – Drachten
- 406: Groningen – Ten Boer – Appingedam – Delfzijl
- 409: Groningen – Assen Busstation Marsdijk – Station Assen
- 410: Groningen – Vries – Assen Busstation Marsdijk – Station Assen
- 417: Groningen → P+R Hoogkerk → Peize → Roden → Leek → P+R Hoogkerk – Groningen
- 418: Groningen → Haren → Zuidlaren → Annen → P+R Gieten → P+R Annen → P+R Westlaren → P+R Haren → Groningen

Regional lines:

- 35: Groningen – Aduard – Oldehove
- 39: Groningen – Vinkhuizen – Zuidhorn – Grootegast – Surhuisterveen
- 50: Groningen – Haren – Glimmen – Vries – Station Assen
- 51: Groningen – Haren – Zuidlaren – Annen – Loon – Station Assen
- 61: Groningen – Bedum – Middelstum – Uithuizen
- 65: Groningen – Winsum – Zoutkamp
- 76: Groningen – Hoogezand
- 85:Groningen – Leek – Oosterwolde
- 107: Zernike – P+R Kardinge – Gasselte – Stadskanaal
- 109: Zernike – P+R Hoogkerk – Assen
- 133: Groningen – P+R Hoogkerk – Via A7 – Grootegast – Surhuisterveen
- 139: Groningen – Hoogkerk – Grootegast – Surhuisterveen
- 163: Groningen – Winsum – Lauwersoog (connecting with the ferry to Schiermonnikoog)
- 171: Zernike – Via A7 – Hoogezand – Veendam
- 178: Groningen – Slochteren – Siddeburen – Appingedam (limited Service to Appingedam)

Other lines:

- 563: Winsum – Bedum – Ten Boer
- 564: Ten Boer – Woltersum – Appingedam

Direct bus routes from Groningen to Bremen, Hamburg, Berlin, and Munich are also available.

=== Motorways ===
The A28 motorway connects Groningen to Utrecht (via Assen, Zwolle and Amersfoort). The A7 motorway connects it to Friesland and Zaandam (West), and Winschoten and Leer (East).

=== Airport ===
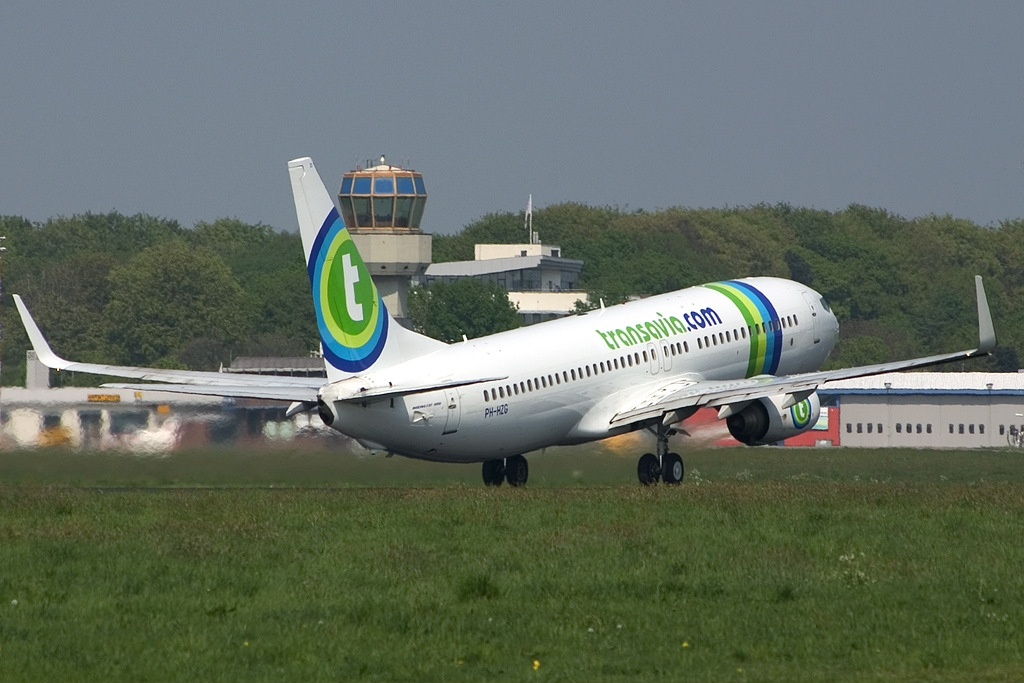
Groningen Airport Eelde

Groningen Airport Eelde is an international airport located near Eelde, in Drenthe, with scheduled services to Guernsey, Gran Canaria, Antalya, Crete, Mallorca and Bodrum.

== Notable people ==
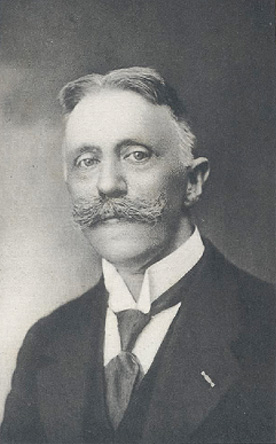
Dirk Jan de Geer, 1926

- Abel Janszoon Tasman (1603–1659), explorer, seafarer, merchant for the Dutch East India Company
- Daniel Bernoulli (1700–1782), mathematician
- Albert Dominicus Trip van Zoudtlandt (1776–1835), lieutenant-general at the Battle of Waterloo
- Geert Adriaans Boomgaard (1788–1899), soldier, first validated supercentenarian
- Heike Kamerlingh Onnes (1853–1926), physicist, Nobel laureate
- Dirk Jan de Geer (1870–1960), statesman and Dutch Prime Minister (1926–1929, 1939–1940), advocated peace settlement between the Netherlands and Nazi Germany in 1940
- Jantina Tammes (1871–1947), botanist and geneticist
- A. W. L. Tjarda van Starkenborgh Stachouwer (1888–1978), last colonial Governor-General of the Netherlands East Indies
- Michel Velleman (1895–1943), Jewish magician
- Jan Wolthuis (1903–1983), lawyer and collaborator, active in far-right politics after World War II
- Esmée van Eeghen (1918–1944), Dutch resistance member executed by the Nazis in Paddepoel, Noorddijk
- Anda Kerkhoven (1919–1945), Dutch resistance member executed by the Nazis near Glimmen
- Luit Bieringa (1942–2022), New Zealand Art Historian
- Pete Hoekstra (born 1953), United States ambassador to the Netherlands and Canada, former Republican member of Congress
- Lex Cazemier (born 1958), speed skater
- Gerard Kemkers (born 1967), speed skating bronze medalist at 1988 Winter Olympics
- Kim Feenstra (born 1985), model
- Ben Woldring (born 1985), internet entrepreneur
- Bauke Mollema (born 1986), cyclist
- Luciano Valente (born 2003), professional footballer
- Noisia, music producer trio
- Vicetone, DJ and music producer duo
- Lois Abbingh (born 1992), handball player and world champion

== See also ==
- Sint Geertruidsgasthuis, a hofje in Groningen
