= Winsum train collision =

Dutch train disaster

Winsum train disaster
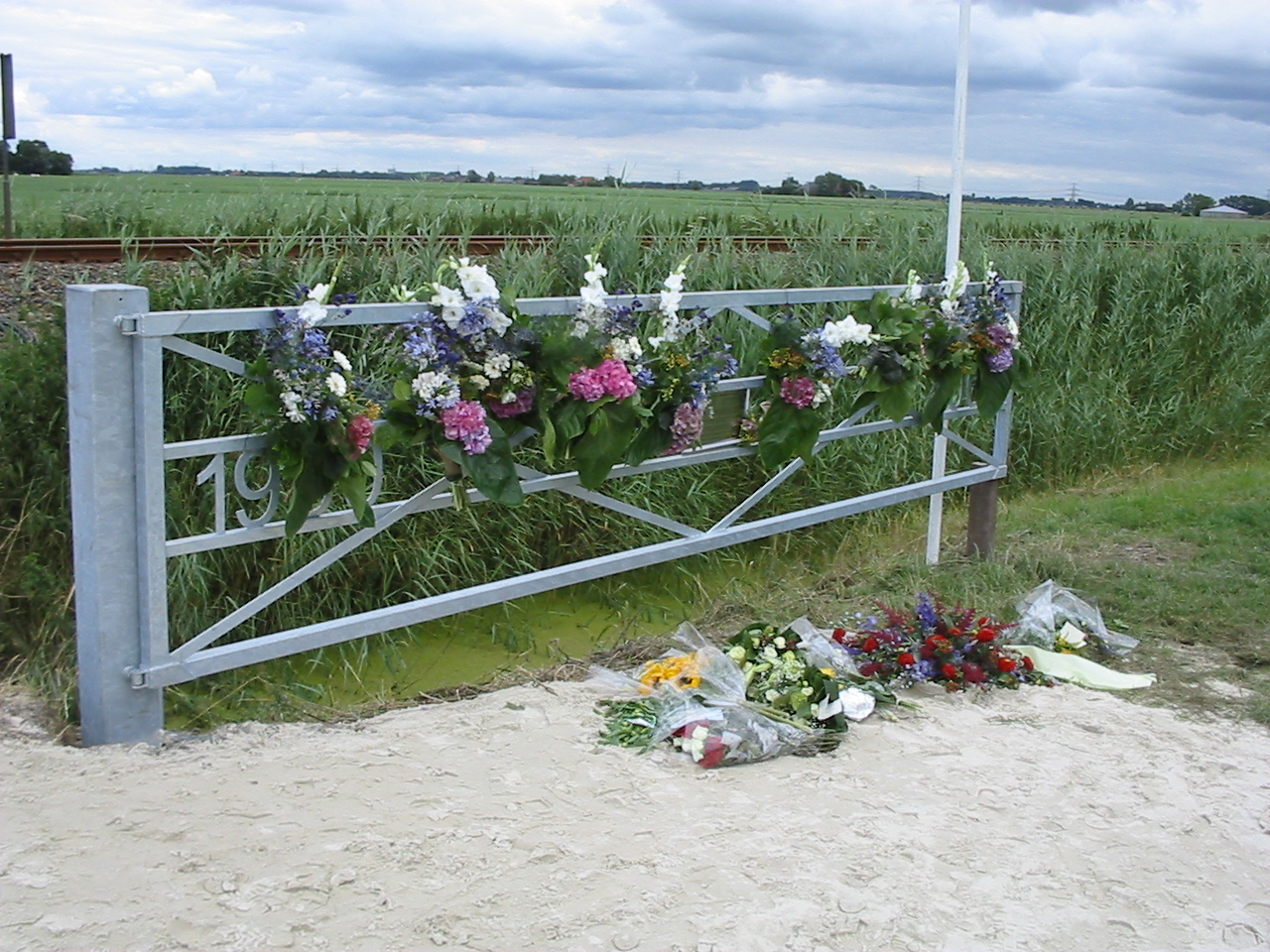
- Commemorative gate near the site of the disaster, a day after the remembrance ceremony in 2005

- Location within Netherlands

Details
- Date: 25 July 1980
- Location: Winsum, Groningen
- Coordinates: 53°19′4″N 6°31′41″E
- Country: Netherlands
- Line: Sauwerd–Roodeschool railway
- Operator: Nederlandse Spoorwegen
- Incident type: Head-on-collision

Statistics
- Trains: 2
- Deaths: 9
- Injured: 21

The Winsum train disaster took place on 25 July 1980 near Winsum in the Dutch province of Groningen. Nine people died and 21 were injured.

The collision took place on a single track between Sauwerd and Roodeschool that did not have ATB or signals, instead the drivers were informed by radio where other trains on the tracks were, which was a less reliable system that relied on trust.

In the foggy early morning of 25 July 1980 the driver of commuter train 8726 began to move the train from Winsum railway station. Because of the fog he could not see the other train (8713) coming from Sauwerd, which the traffic controllers had warned him about and they told him to wait departing from Winsum until it had passed. Both trains collided head on.

The true cause of the disaster never became clear.
