= Groningen (province) =

Northeasternmost province of the Netherlands

Groningen Groningen (Dutch) Grunnen (Gronings) Grinslân (West Frisian)
- Province
- Province of Groningen; Provincie Groningen (Dutch); Provìnzie Grunnen (Gronings); Provinsje Grinslân (West Frisian)
- Flag Coat of arms Brandmark
- Anthem: "Grönnens Laid" "Song of Groningen"
- Location of Groningen in the Netherlands

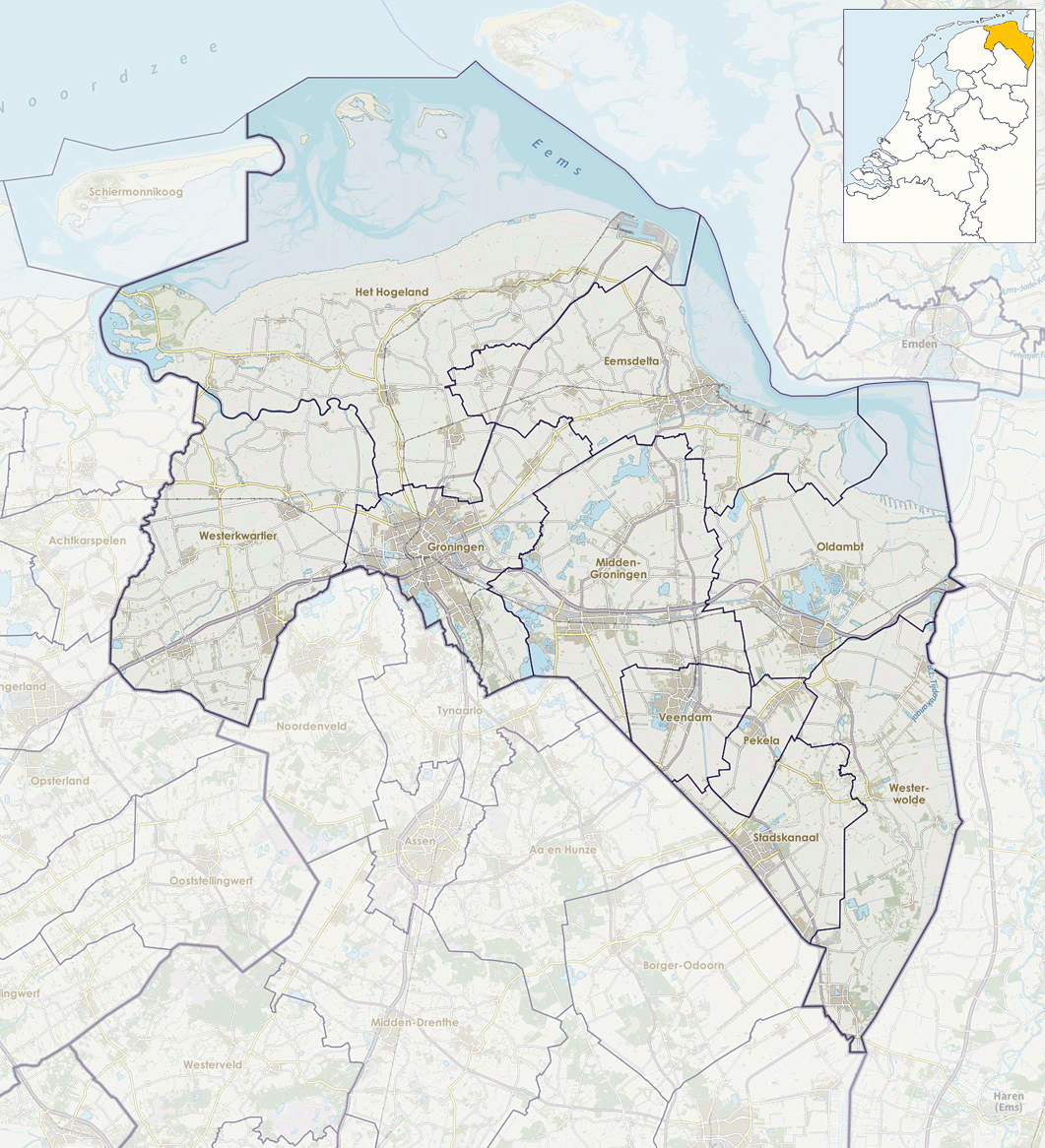
- Topography map of Groningen
- Coordinates: 53°15′N 6°44′E
- Country: Netherlands
- Capital (and largest city): Groningen

Government
  - King's Commissioner: René Paas (CDA)
  - Council: States of Groningen

Area (2023)
  - Total: 2,955 km^{2} (1,141 sq mi)
  - Land: 2,316 km^{2} (894 sq mi)
  - Water: 639 km^{2} (247 sq mi)
  - Rank: 7th

Population (1 January 2023)
  - Total: 596,075
  - Rank: 9th
  - Density: 257/km^{2} (670/sq mi)
  - Rank: 9th

GDP
  - Total: €32.846 billion (2024)
  - Per capita: €54,561 (2024)
- Time zone: UTC+1 (CET)
  - Summer (DST): UTC+2 (CEST)
- ISO 3166 code: NL-GR
- HDI (2021): 0.930 very high · 5th of 12
- Website: www.provinciegroningen.nl

Groningen (/ˈɡroʊnɪŋən/ GROH-ning-ən, UK also /ˈɡrɒnɪŋən/ GRON-ing-ən; Dutch: [ˈɣroːnɪŋə(n)]; Gronings: Grunn; West Frisian: Grinslân [ˈɡrẽːslɔ̃ːn]) is the northeasternmost province of the Netherlands. It borders on Friesland to the west, Drenthe to the south, the German state of Lower Saxony to the east, and the Wadden Sea to the north. As of January 2023, Groningen had a population of about 596,000, and a total area of 2,955 km^{2} (1,141 sq mi).

Historically the area was at different times part of Frisia, the Frankish Empire, the Holy Roman Empire, and the Dutch Republic, the precursor state of the modern Netherlands. In the 14th century, the city of Groningen became a member of the Hanseatic League.

The provincial capital and the largest city in the province is the city of Groningen (231,299 inhabitants). Since 2016, René Paas has been the King's Commissioner in the province. A coalition of GroenLinks, the Labour Party, ChristianUnion, People's Party for Freedom and Democracy, Democrats 66, and Christian Democratic Appeal forms the executive branch. The province is divided into 10 municipalities.

The land is mainly used for agriculture. There are seaports in Delfzijl and Eemshaven. The Groningen gas field, one of the world's largest, was discovered in 1959. The province is home to the University of Groningen and Hanze University of Applied Sciences.

== History ==
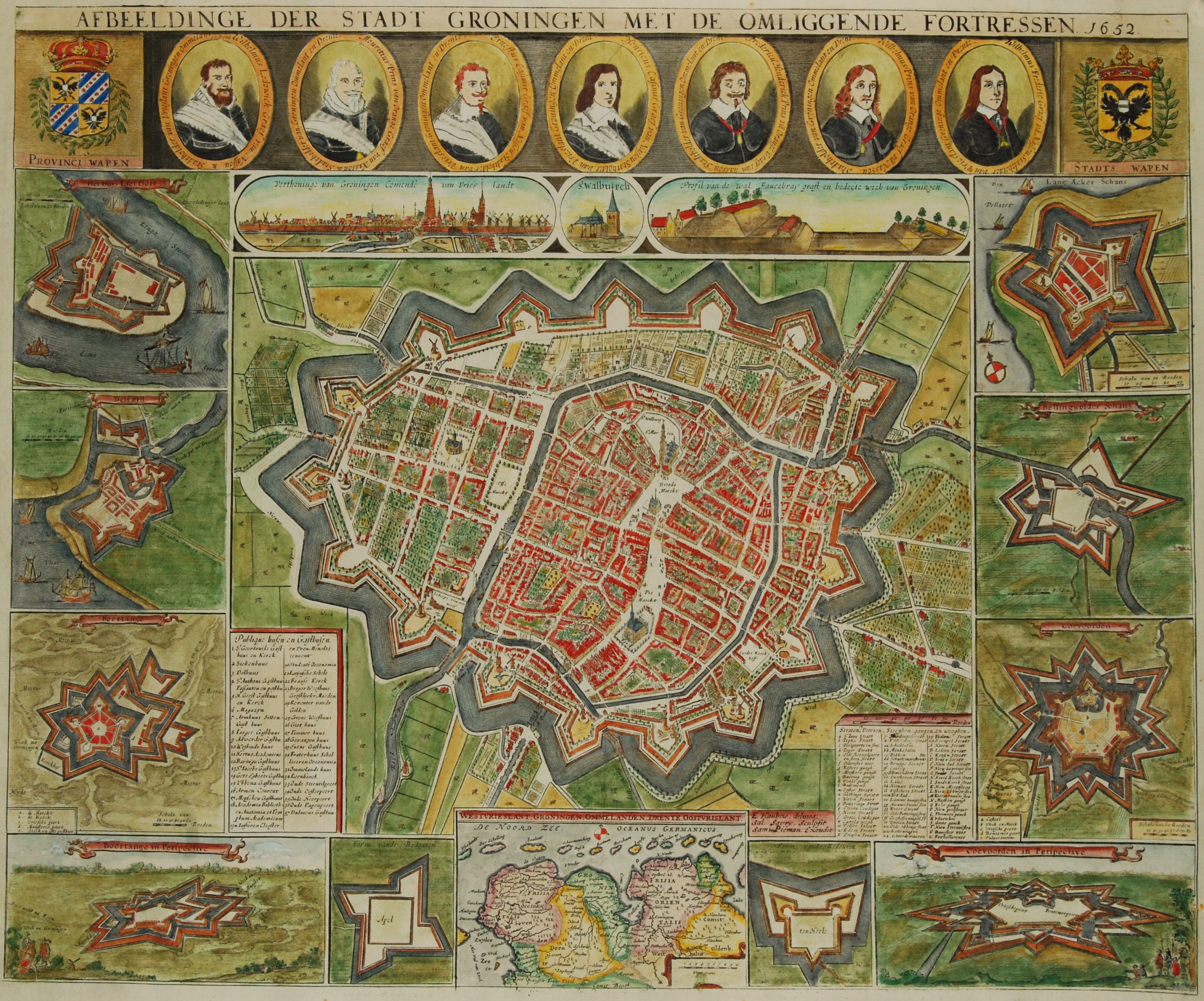
1652 map of the city of Groningen and the surrounding fortifications

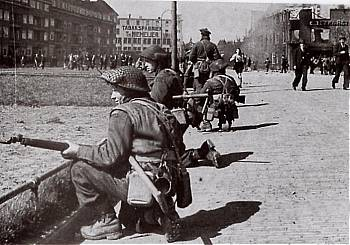
Canadian soldiers during the Battle of Groningen in April 1945

Groningen was originally a part of Frisia. It became a part of the Frankish Empire around 785. Charlemagne assigned the Christianization of this new possession to Ludger.

In the 11th century, the city of Groningen was a village in Drenthe that belonged to the Bishopric of Utrecht, while most of the province was in the Prince-Bishopric of Münster.

During the Middle Ages, central control was remote, and the city of Groningen acted as a city-state, exerting a dominating influence on the surrounding Ommelanden. In the 14th century, Groningen became one of the towns within the Hanseatic League. In the years after, Groningen expanded its influence. At its peak almost all of the current province Friesland was under the influence and control of Groningen.

Shortly before 1498, Maximilian I, Holy Roman Emperor gave Groningen and Friesland to Albert III, Duke of Saxony, who could however not establish permanent control. In 1514/15 Groningen came to the Duchy of Guelders, and in 1536 as the Lordship of Groningen to the Habsburg Netherlands.

In 1594, Groningen was conquered from the Spanish by the Republic of the Seven United Provinces, precursor state of the Netherlands, to which it belonged henceforth.

During World War II, the Netherlands were occupied by Nazi Germany. In April 1945, the 2nd Canadian Division fought in the Battle of Groningen, which resulted in the liberation of the city and in the death of 130, the capture of 5,212, and the fleeing of 2,000 German soldiers. In May 1945, another 3,000 German soldiers were captured in the Battle of Delfzijl by the 5th Canadian Division, after which all of the northern provinces were liberated.

East Groningen was the scene of a particularly fierce class struggle in the 19th and 20th centuries. Perhaps not coincidentally, Groningen boasts the only municipality (Beerta) where the Communist Party of the Netherlands has ever had a mayor (Hanneke Jagersma).

== Geography ==
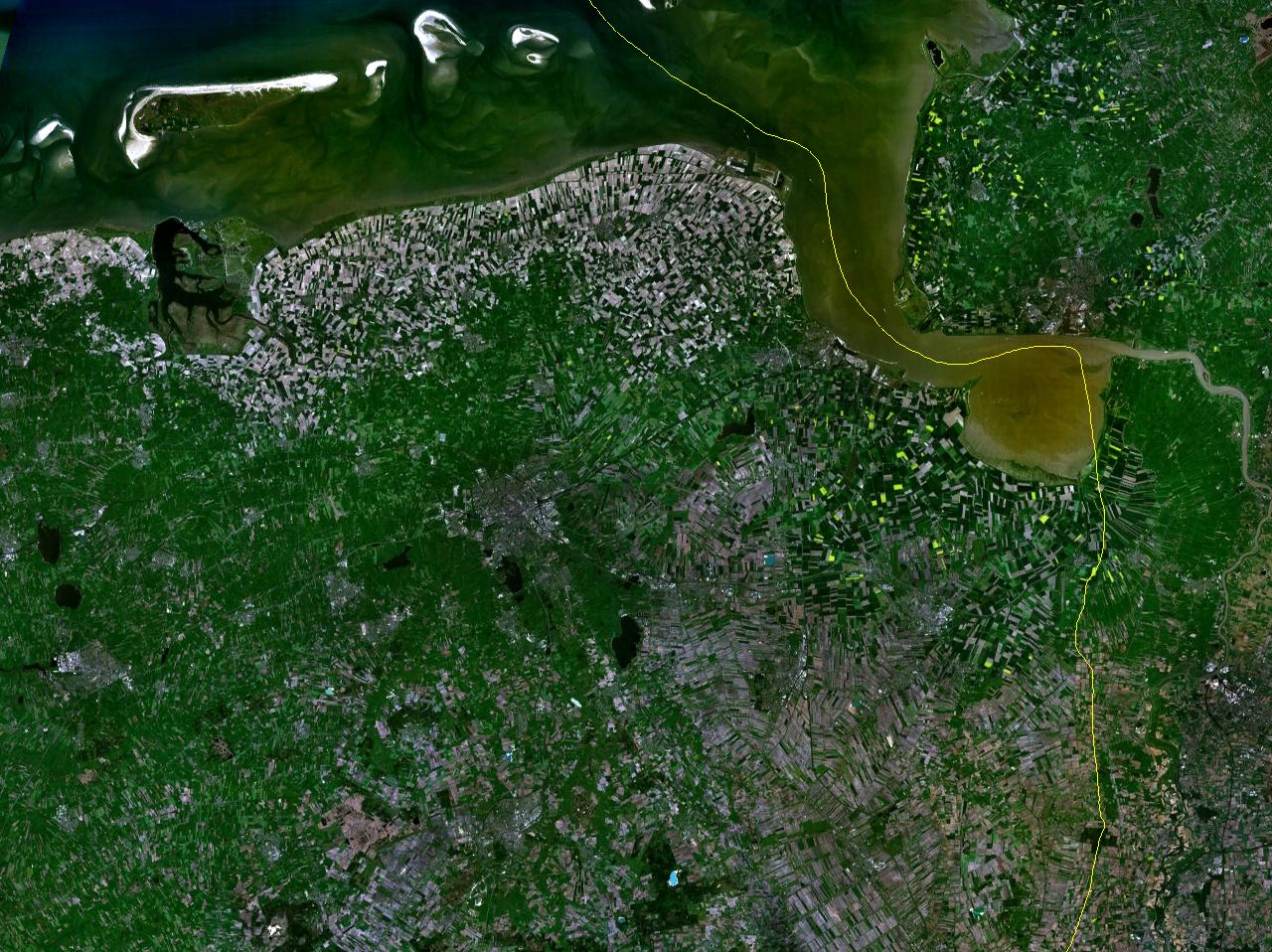
Satellite image of Groningen

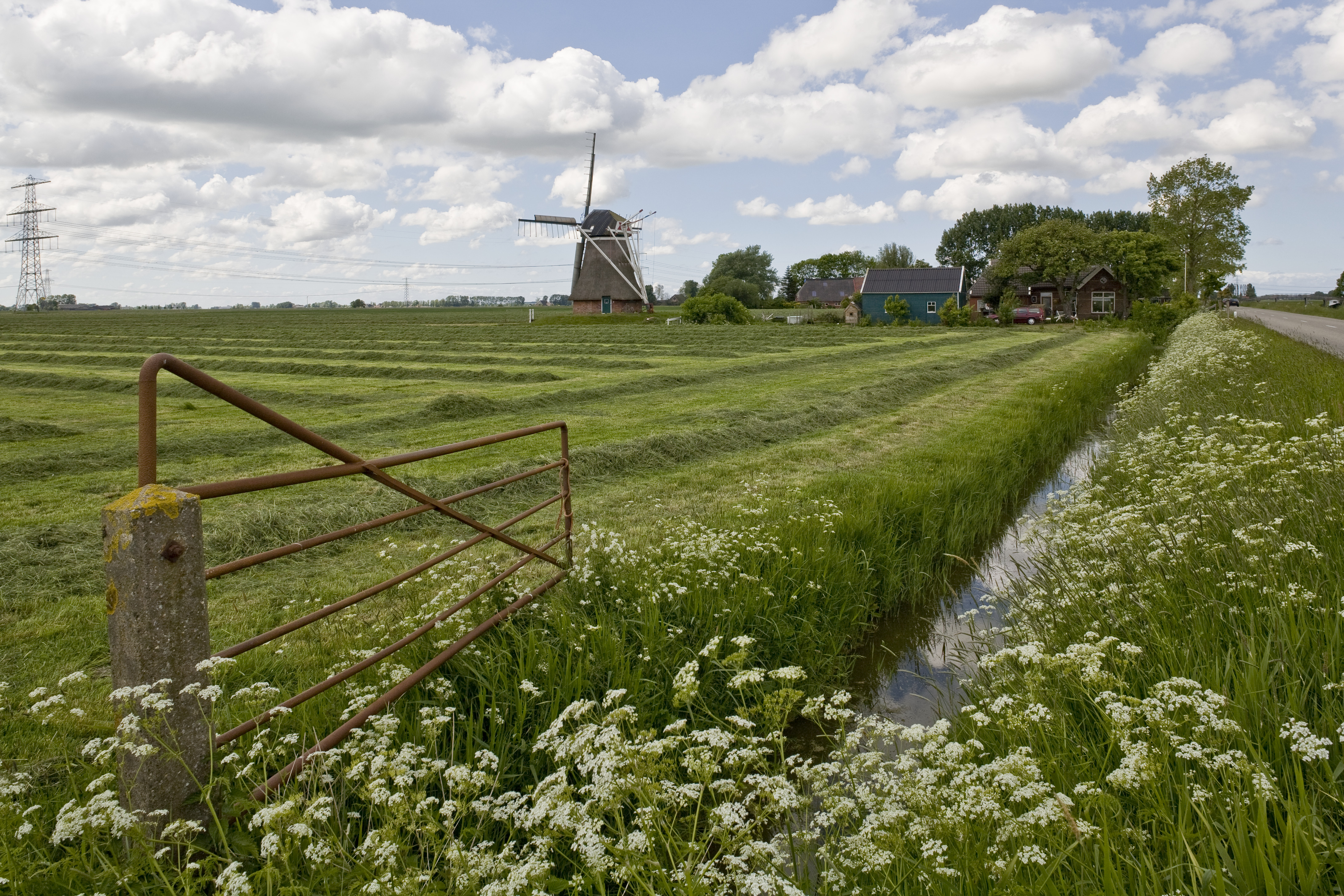
The land is flat and 80% of it is used for agriculture.

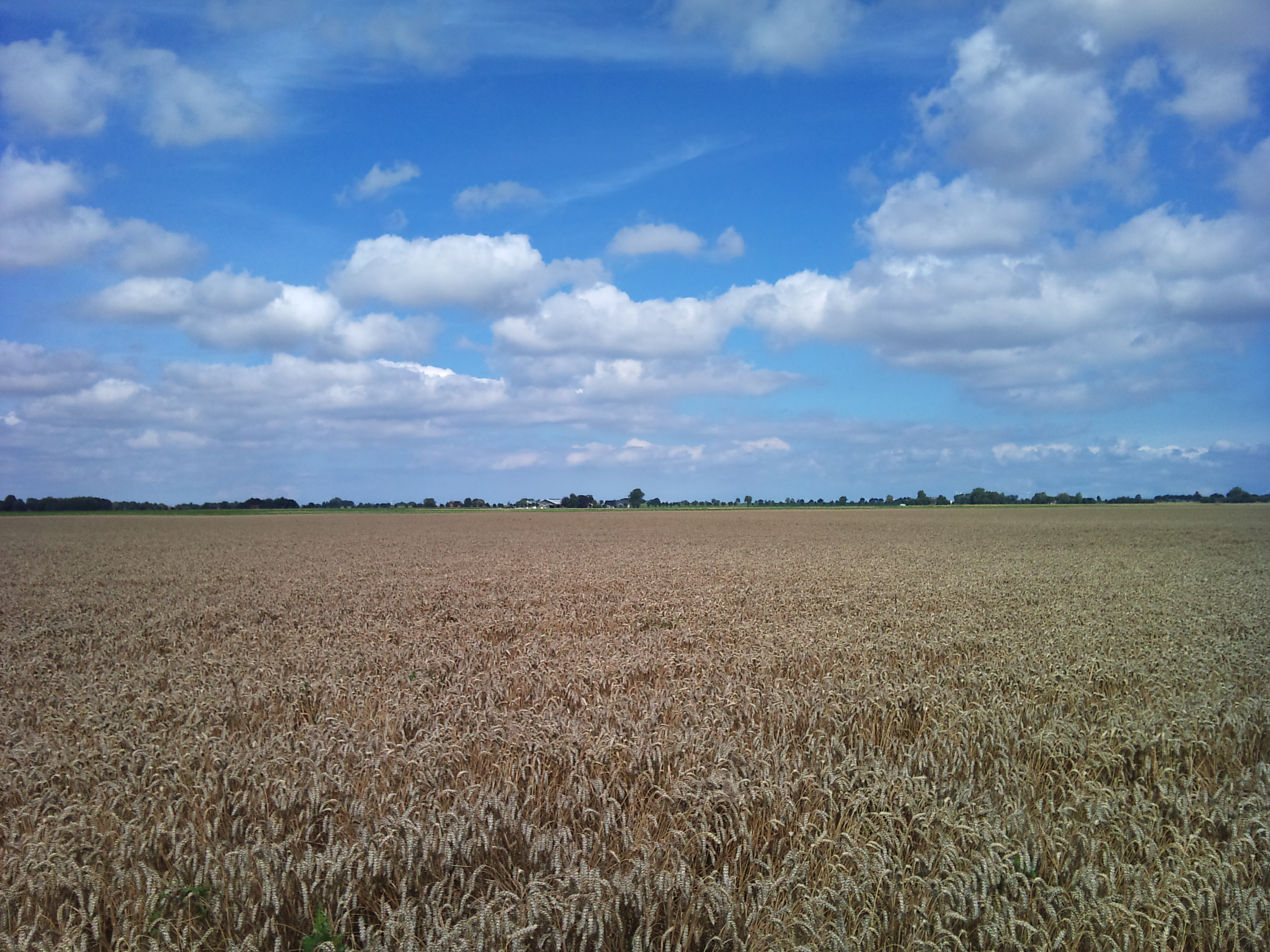
Wheat field near Nieuw-Beerta in the Oldambt

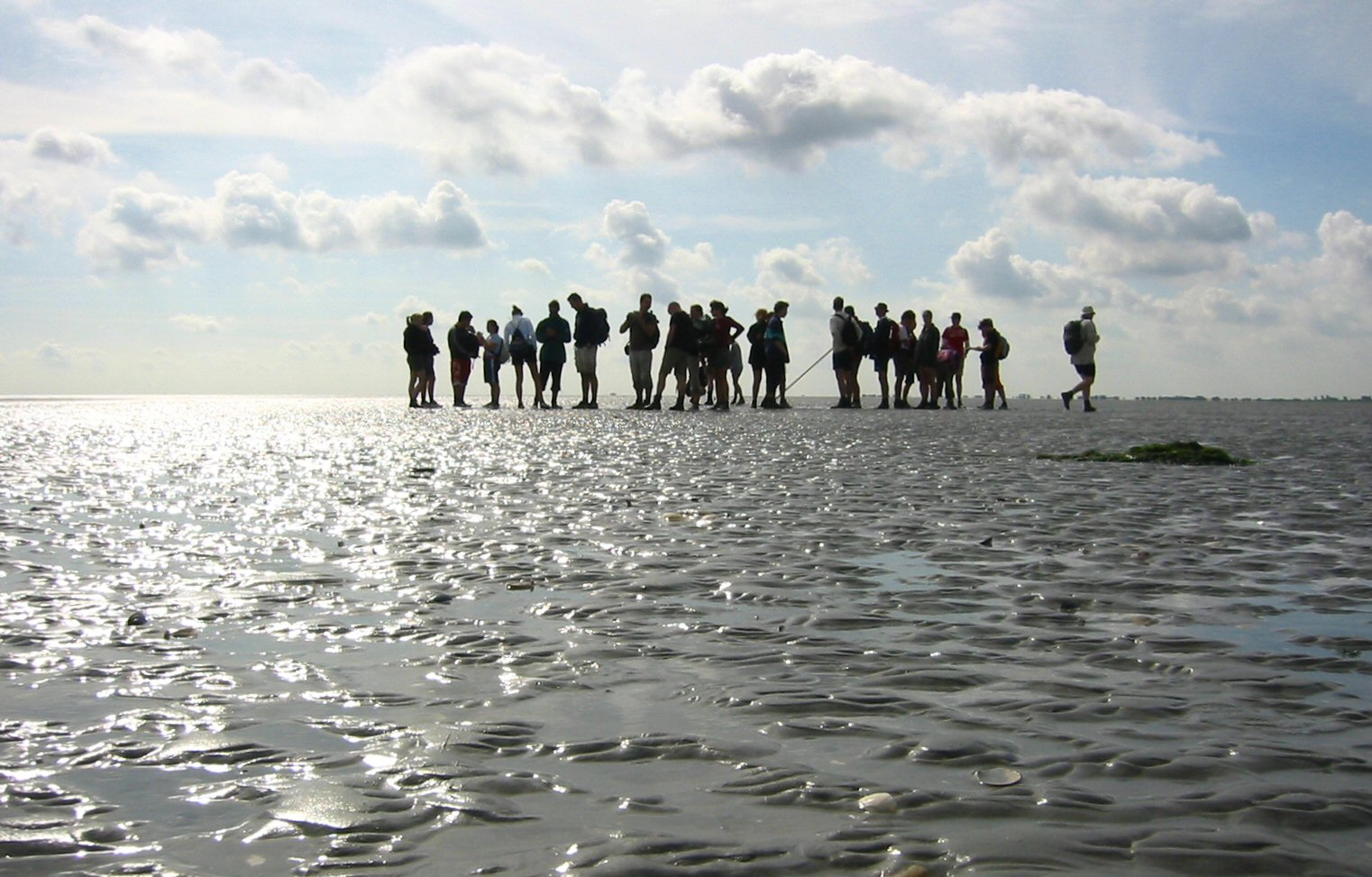
Mudflat hikers during low tide on the Wadden Sea near Pieterburen

Groningen is situated at 53°15′N 6°44′E in the northeast of the Netherlands. To the west is the province Friesland, to the south is the province Drenthe, to the east the German districts are Leer and Emsland in the state Lower Saxony, and to the north the North Sea, Ems, and Dollart. The northernmost point of the Netherlands is on Rottumerplaat at 53°33′18″N 6°28′41″E; the easternmost point of the Netherlands is in Bad Nieuweschans at 53°10′49″N 7°13′40″E.

Groningen is the 7th largest province of the Netherlands. It has a total area of 2,955 km^{2} (1,141 sq mi), with 2,316 km^{2} (894 sq mi) of land and 639 km^{2} (247 sq mi) of water. About 80% of the land or 1,876 km^{2} (724 sq mi) is used for agriculture. The rest of the land is: 9% or 158 km^{2} (61 sq mi) of built-up or semi built-up area, 6% or 144 km^{2} (56 sq mi) of nature, 3% or 66 km^{2} (25 sq mi) of infrastructure, and 2% or 43 km^{2} (17 sq mi) of recreational area.

The land in Groningen is flat. A large area of the province is below sea level. The Hasseberg near Sellingen of 14.6 m (48 ft) above sea level is the highest point.

The Groningen gas field near Slochteren is the 8th largest natural gas field in the world. Since 1986, the exploitation of this gas field has caused earthquakes in the region with magnitudes up to 3.6.

In the Wadden Sea of Groningen, a UNESCO World Heritage Site since 2009, are the sandbank Simonszand and the natural reserve Rottum consisting of the three uninhabited islands Rottumeroog, Rottumerplaat, and Zuiderduintjes. The national park Lauwersmeer (IUCN category II) is located on the border between Groningen and Friesland.

=== Subdivisions ===
The province of Groningen is also called Stad en Ommelanden, meaning "City and Surrounding Lands", referring to the eponymous city of Groningen as well as the "surrounding lands" of Fivelingo, Hunsingo, Oldambt, Westerkwartier, and Westerwolde.

The province (Nomenclature of Territorial Units for Statistics or NUTS level 2) is divided into three COROP regions (NUTS level 3): East Groningen, Delfzijl and surroundings, and the rest of Groningen. The COROP regions are used for statistical purposes.

The province is also divided into ten municipalities, each with its own local government. Currently, Groningen is the most populated and most densely populated municipality, containing the largest city.

Municipality	Population	Total Area	Population density	COROP Region
Eemsdelta				Delfzijl and surroundings
Groningen	233,273	197.96 km^{2} (76.43 sq mi)	1,257/km^{2} (3,260/sq mi)	Rest of Groningen
Het Hogeland				Rest of Groningen
Midden-Groningen				Rest of Groningen
Oldambt	38,277	295.96 km^{2} (114.27 sq mi)	169/km^{2} (440/sq mi)	East Groningen
Pekela	12,176	50.20 km^{2} (19.38 sq mi)	248/km^{2} (640/sq mi)	East Groningen
Stadskanaal	31,754	119.94 km^{2} (46.31 sq mi)	270/km^{2} (700/sq mi)	East Groningen
Veendam	27,417	78.68 km^{2} (30.38 sq mi)	361/km^{2} (930/sq mi)	East Groningen
Westerkwartier				Rest of Groningen
Westerwolde				East Groningen

=== Climate ===
The province of Groningen has an oceanic climate (Köppen climate classification: Cfb).

Climate data for Nieuw-Beerta (1981–2010 averages)
Month	Jan	Feb	Mar	Apr	May	Jun	Jul	Aug	Sep	Oct	Nov	Dec	Year
Mean daily maximum °C (°F)	4.7 (40.5)	5.6 (42.1)	9.2 (48.6)	13.9 (57.0)	17.3 (63.1)	20.0 (68.0)	22.7 (72.9)	22.7 (72.9)	18.8 (65.8)	13.6 (56.5)	8.5 (47.3)	4.7 (40.5)	13.5 (56.3)
Daily mean °C (°F)	2.3 (36.1)	2.7 (36.9)	5.3 (41.5)	8.7 (47.7)	12.2 (54.0)	14.9 (58.8)	17.4 (63.3)	17.4 (63.3)	14.2 (57.6)	9.8 (49.6)	6.0 (42.8)	2.4 (36.3)	9.5 (49.1)
Mean daily minimum °C (°F)	−0.2 (31.6)	−0.2 (31.6)	1.4 (34.5)	3.5 (38.3)	6.9 (44.4)	9.4 (48.9)	12.1 (53.8)	12.1 (53.8)	9.9 (49.8)	6.3 (43.3)	3.3 (37.9)	−0.1 (31.8)	5.4 (41.7)
Average relative humidity (%)	90	89	85	80	80	82	82	81	85	88	92	92	86
Mean monthly sunshine hours	—	—	134.3	187.2	222.4	208.4	215.8	189.9	149.3	120.1	60.3	59.6	—
Percentage possible sunshine	—	—	36	45	45	41	42	42	39	37	23	25	—
Source: Royal Netherlands Meteorological Institute

== Demographics ==
Historical population
Year	Pop.	±% p.a.
1899	299,602	—
1930	392,436	+0.87%
1942	430,271	+0.77%
1950	459,819	+0.83%
1960	474,657	+0.32%
1965	497,472	+0.94%
1970	517,305	+0.78%
1975	536,106	+0.72%
1980	553,709	+0.65%
1985	561,119	+0.27%
1990	553,862	−0.26%
1995	557,995	+0.15%
2000	562,646	+0.17%
2005	575,072	+0.44%
2010	576,668	+0.06%
2015	582,649	+0.21%
2020	585,866	+0.11%
Source: CBS

On 1 January 2023, the province of Groningen had a population of 596,075 and a population density of 257/km^{2} (670/sq mi), which make it the 9th most populous province and 8th most densely populated province of the Netherlands. The city of Groningen is the most populous city in the province and the 6th most populous city in the Netherlands.

On 1 January 2013, 92.2% of the total provincial population was born in the Netherlands; and of the 7.8% that was born abroad, the ten most common foreign countries of origin are the neighbour Germany (1.09%), the former colonies and dependencies Indonesia (0.60%), Netherlands Antilles and Aruba (0.55%), Suriname (0.54%), and other countries Turkey (0.41%), Soviet Union (0.36%), China (0.32%), Poland (0,26%), Yugoslavia (0.26%), and United Kingdom (0.18%).

== Religion ==
In 2015, 18.7% of the population belonged to the Protestant Church in the Netherlands while 4.9% was Roman Catholic, 1.3% was Muslim and 6.7% belonged to other churches or faiths. Over half (68.4%) of the population identified as non-religious.

Religion in Groningen (province) (2015)
1. Not religious (68.4%)
2. Protestant Church in the Netherlands (18.7%)
3. Other (6.70%)
4. Catholicism (4.90%)
5. Islam (1.30%)

== Economy ==
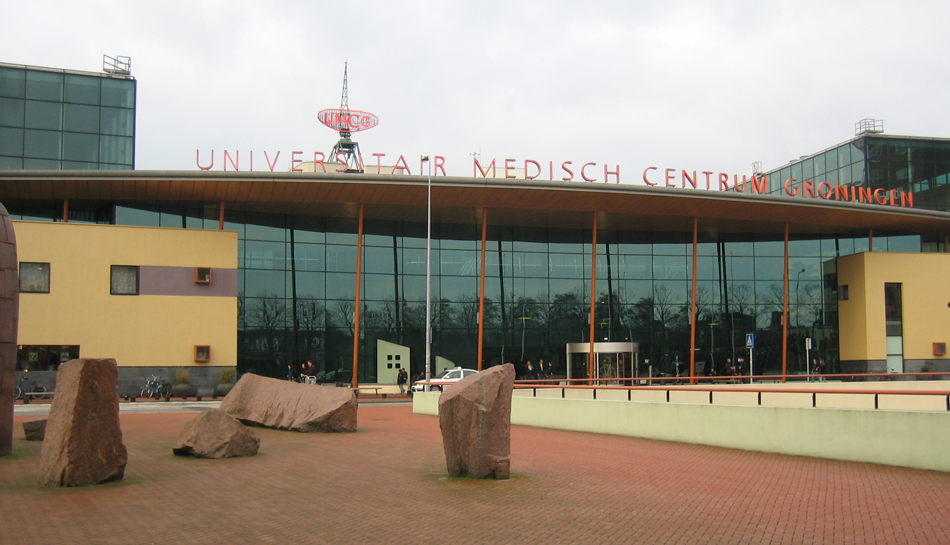
The University Medical Center is a major employer in Groningen.

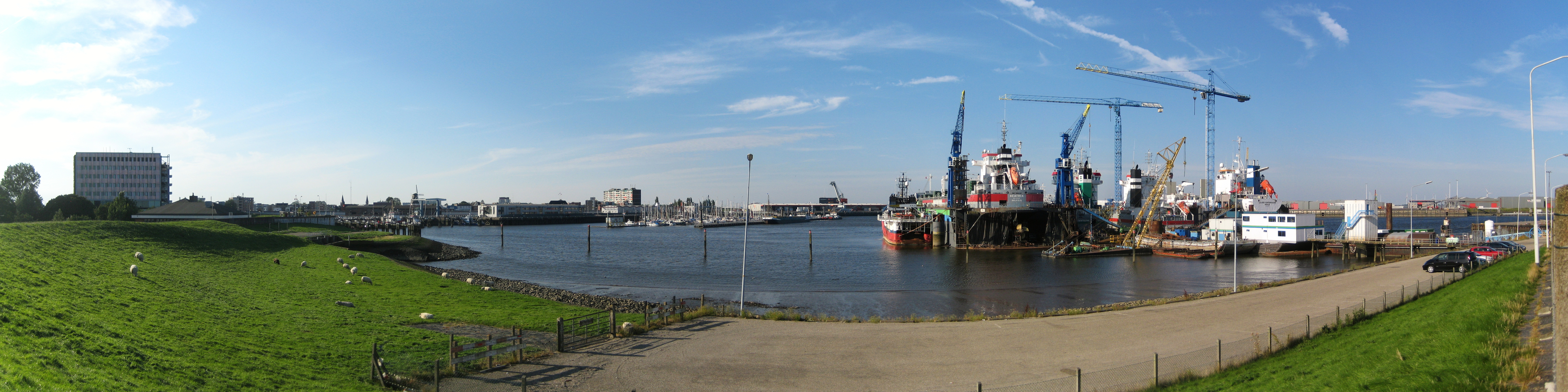
Sea port of Delfzijl in 2012

The city of Groningen is the economic center of the province. In the 14th century, the city became a member of the Hanseatic League. Currently some of the city's major employers are University Medical Center Groningen with 12,141 employees, University of Groningen with 5,591 employees, Municipality of Groningen with 3,063 employees, Education Implementation Service (DUO) with 2,000 employees, and Gasunie with 1,748 employees.

The other economically important area is the Ems delta with the sea ports of Delfzijl and Eemshaven. In 2015, a total of 11,589 cargo vessels arrived at the two Groningen Seaports combined, 7,111 sea vessels and 4,478 inland vessels. The ports had a cargo throughput of 11,309,000 tonnes. The chemical industry near Delfzijl is located at the Chemie Park in Farmsum, with factories of AkzoNobel, Lubrizol, and Teijin Aramid. Both GDF Suez and Vattenfall have a natural gas-fired power plant in Eemshaven, and Essent is building a coal-fired power plant there.

The Gross domestic product (GDP) of the province was 25 billion € in 2018, accounting for 3.2% of the Netherlands economic output. GDP per capita adjusted for purchasing power was €37,300 or 124% of the EU27 average in the same year.

In 1959, the Groningen gas field near Slochteren was discovered, and the NAM started to exploit the field in 1963. This caused Dutch disease and induced earthquakes.

In 2013, Groningen had a labor force of 268,000 people and unemployment rate of 9.6%, which is the second highest unemployment for a province in the Netherlands.

== Culture ==
=== Language ===
A Gronings speaker, recorded in the Netherlands

Groningen is home to the Low Saxon dialects (or language) called Gronings or Groninger (endonym: Grönnegs or Grunnegs). Variations of Groninger are also spoken in the eastern part of Friesland. The Gronings spoken in the eastern part of Groningen Province shown greater influence from German Low Saxon (Plattdeutsch). These local dialects are in decline, especially in the city of Groningen, to which many speakers of Dutch have moved.

=== Cuisine ===
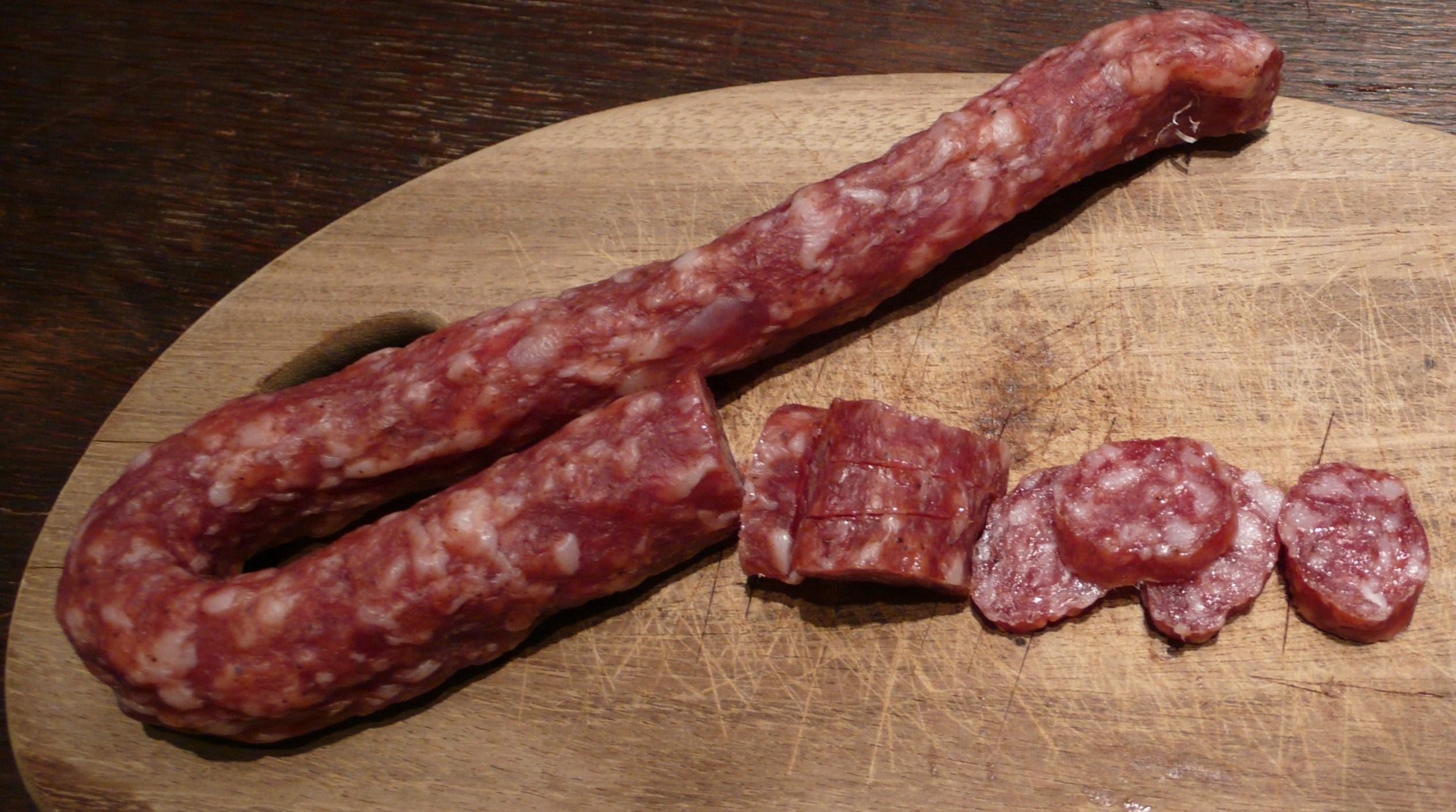
Traditional droge worst (dried sausage) from Groningen

Traditional dishes and delicacies from Groningen are boerenkoolstamppot, droge worst, krentjebrij, oudewijvenkoek, poffert, and spekdik. Traditional alcoholic drinks are boerenjongens, boerenmeisjes, fladderak, and heet bier.

=== Museums ===
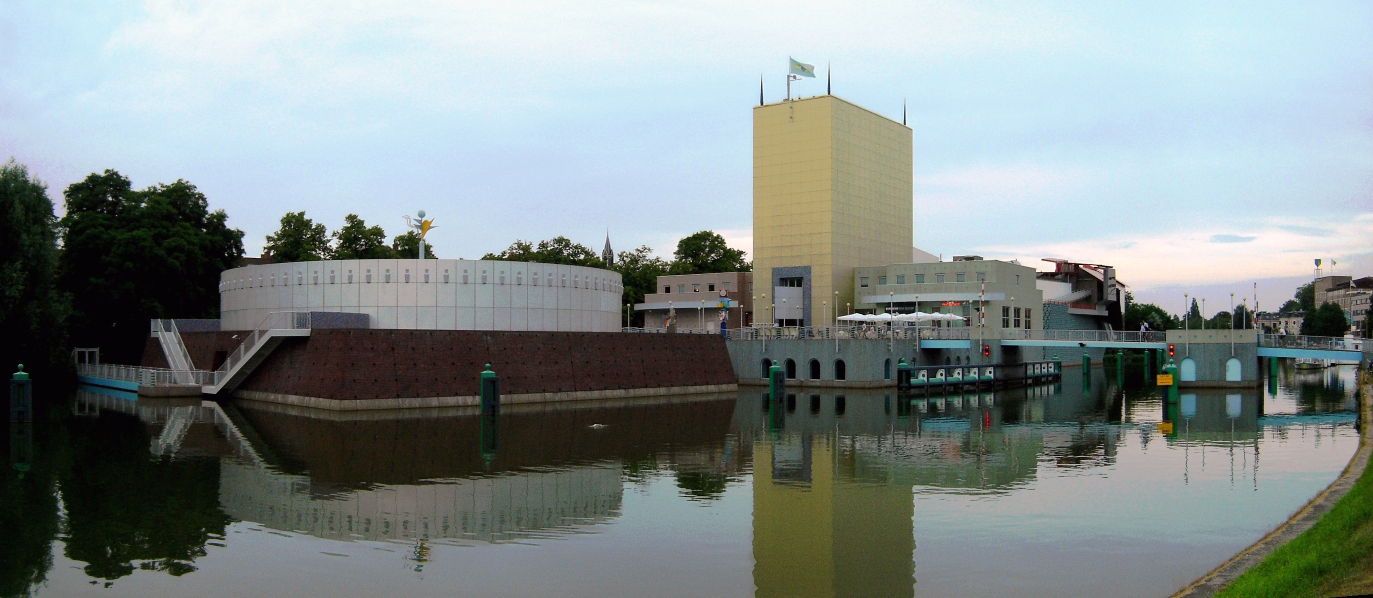
Groninger Museum in Groningen in 2006

Museumhuis Groningen is an umbrella organization for museums and other heritage organizations in the province of Groningen and has 58 members. The Groninger Museum is the most visited museum in the province with 209,195 visitors in 2015. The other museums and heritage organizations with more than 25 thousand visitors in 2015 are Fort Bourtange in Bourtange, Noordelijk Scheepvaartmuseum in Groningen, Ter Apel Monastery in Ter Apel, Fraeylemaborg in Slochteren, Nationaal Bus Museum in Hoogezand, and Museumspoorlijn STAR in Stadskanaal.

=== Heritage sites ===
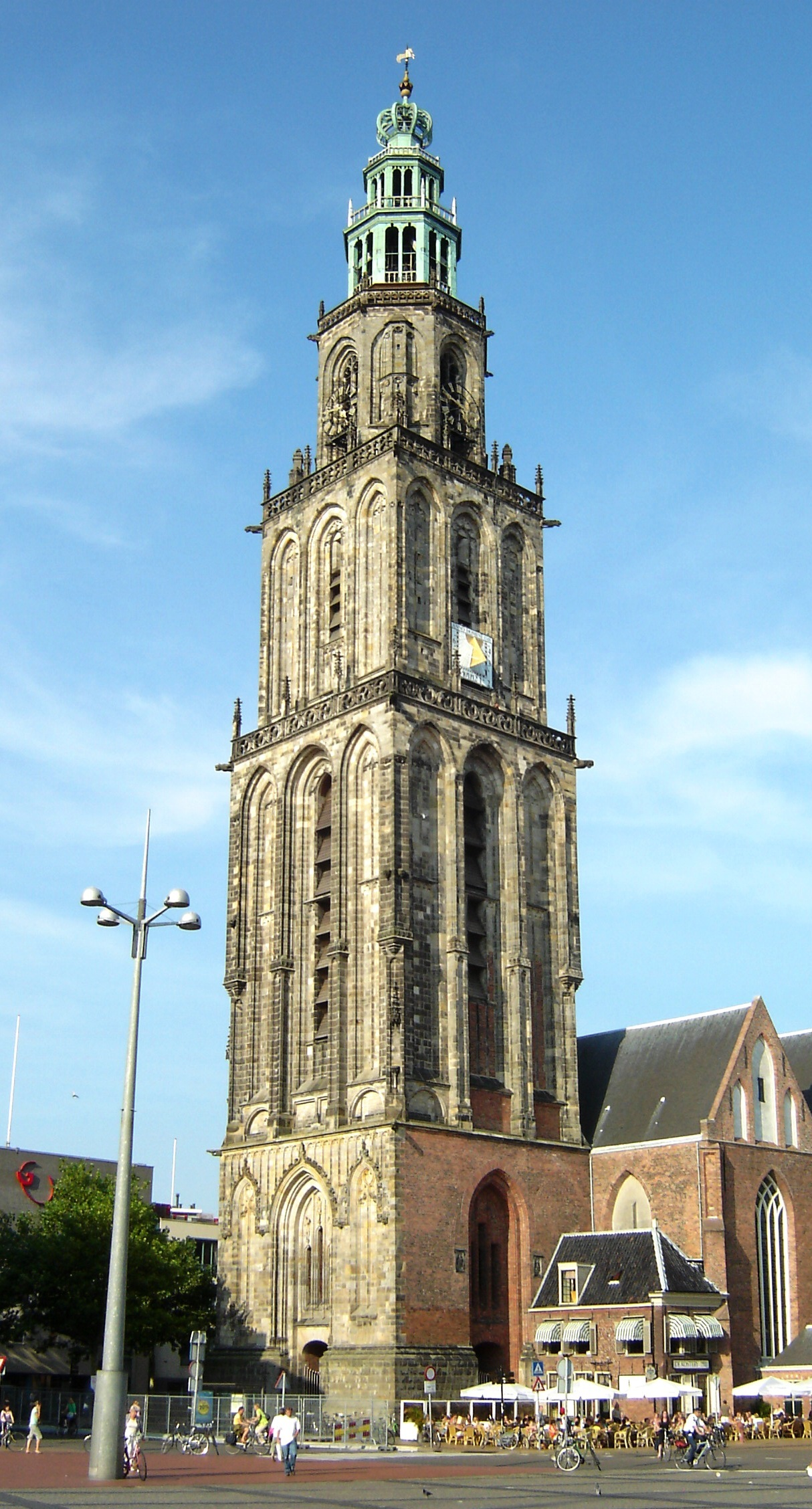
Martinitoren, icon of the provincial capital of Groningen

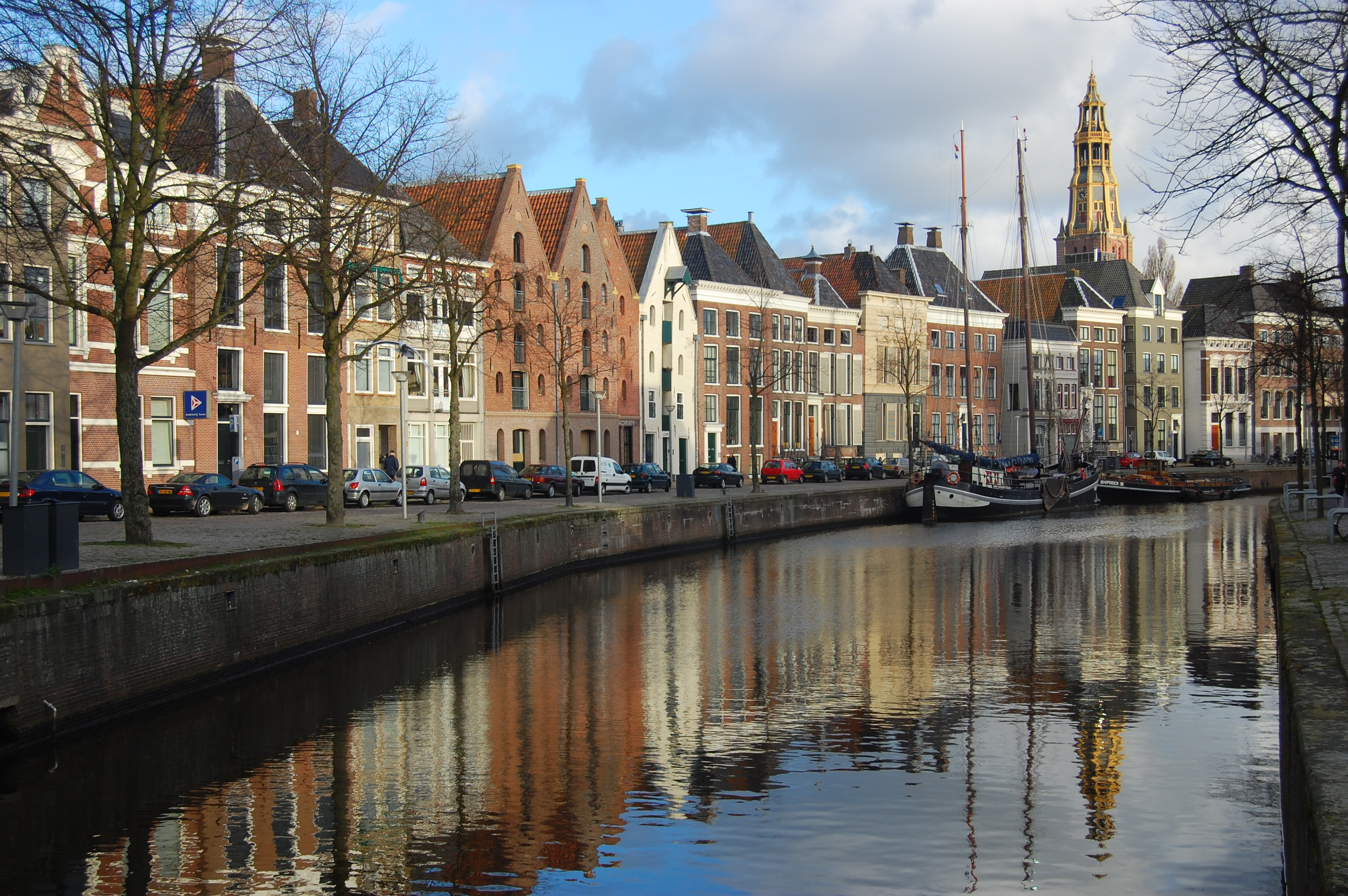
Der Aa-kerk in Groningen

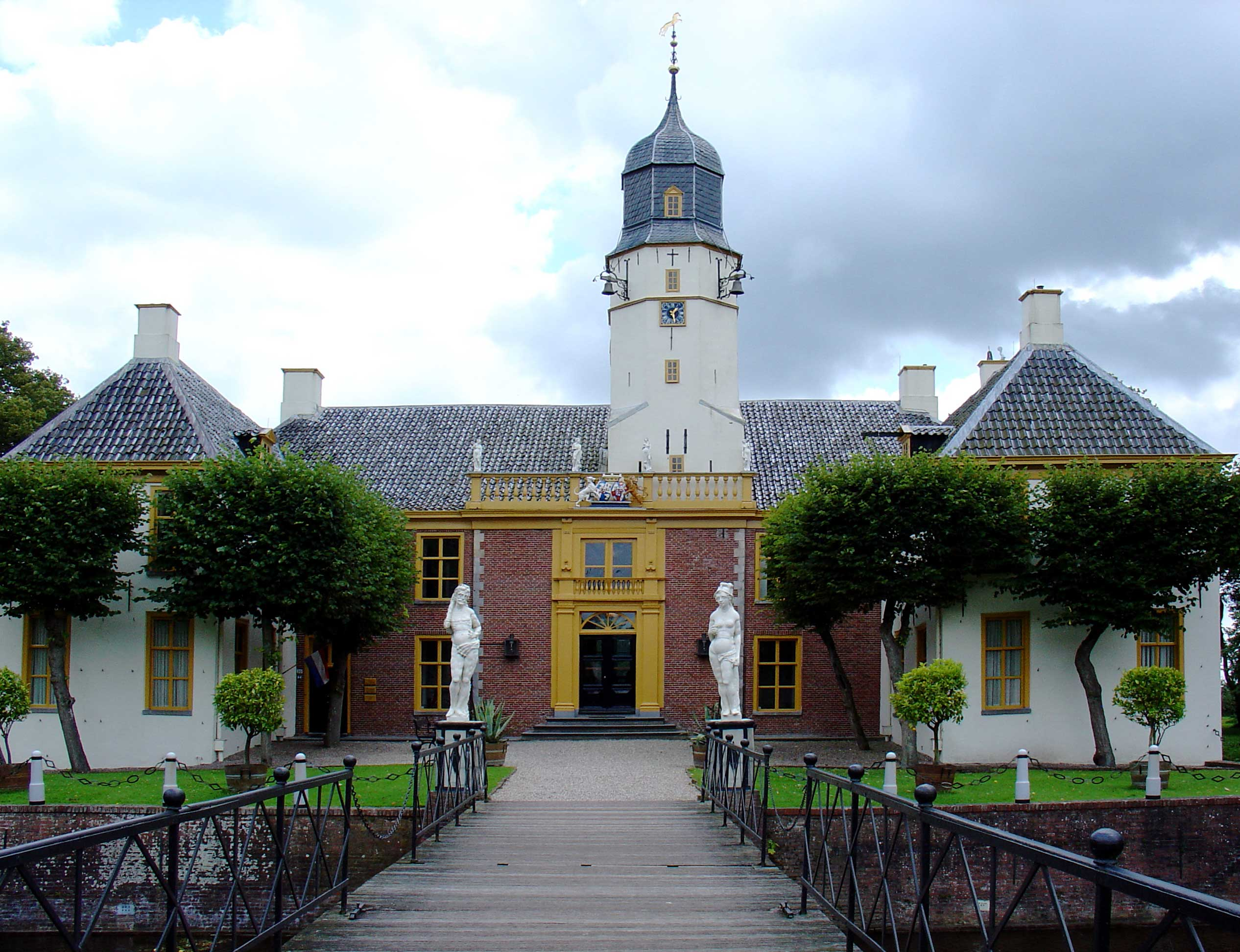
Fraeylemaborg in Slochteren

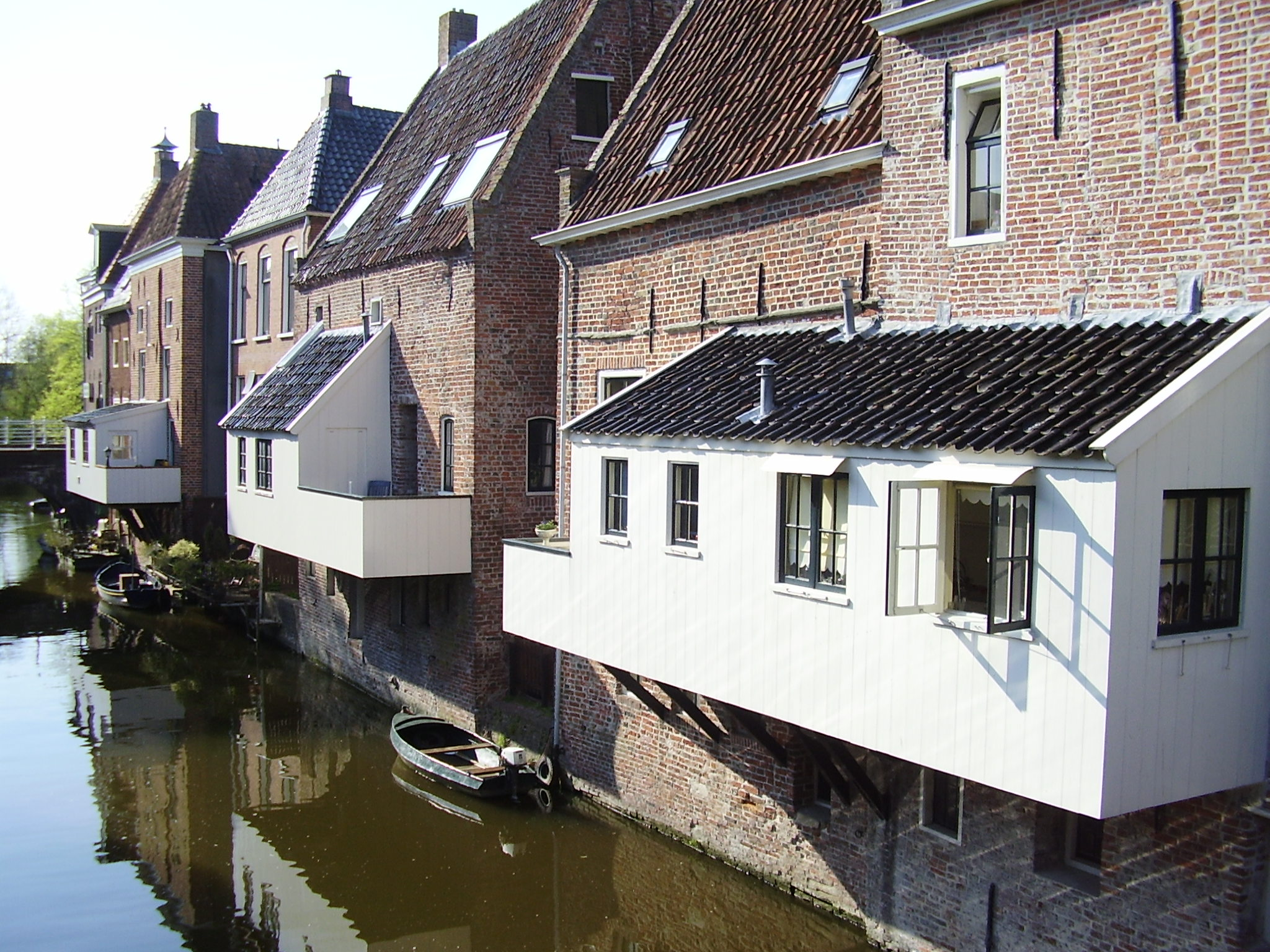
Hanging kitchens of Appingedam

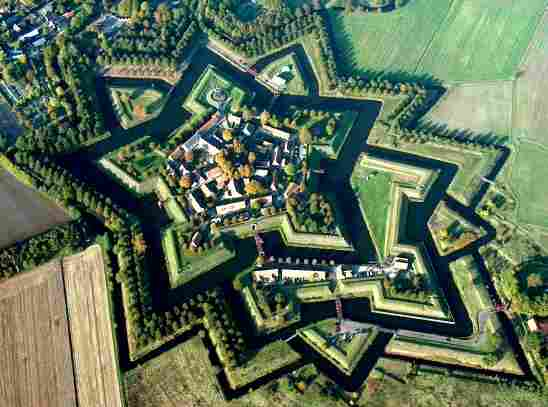
Star fort of Bourtange

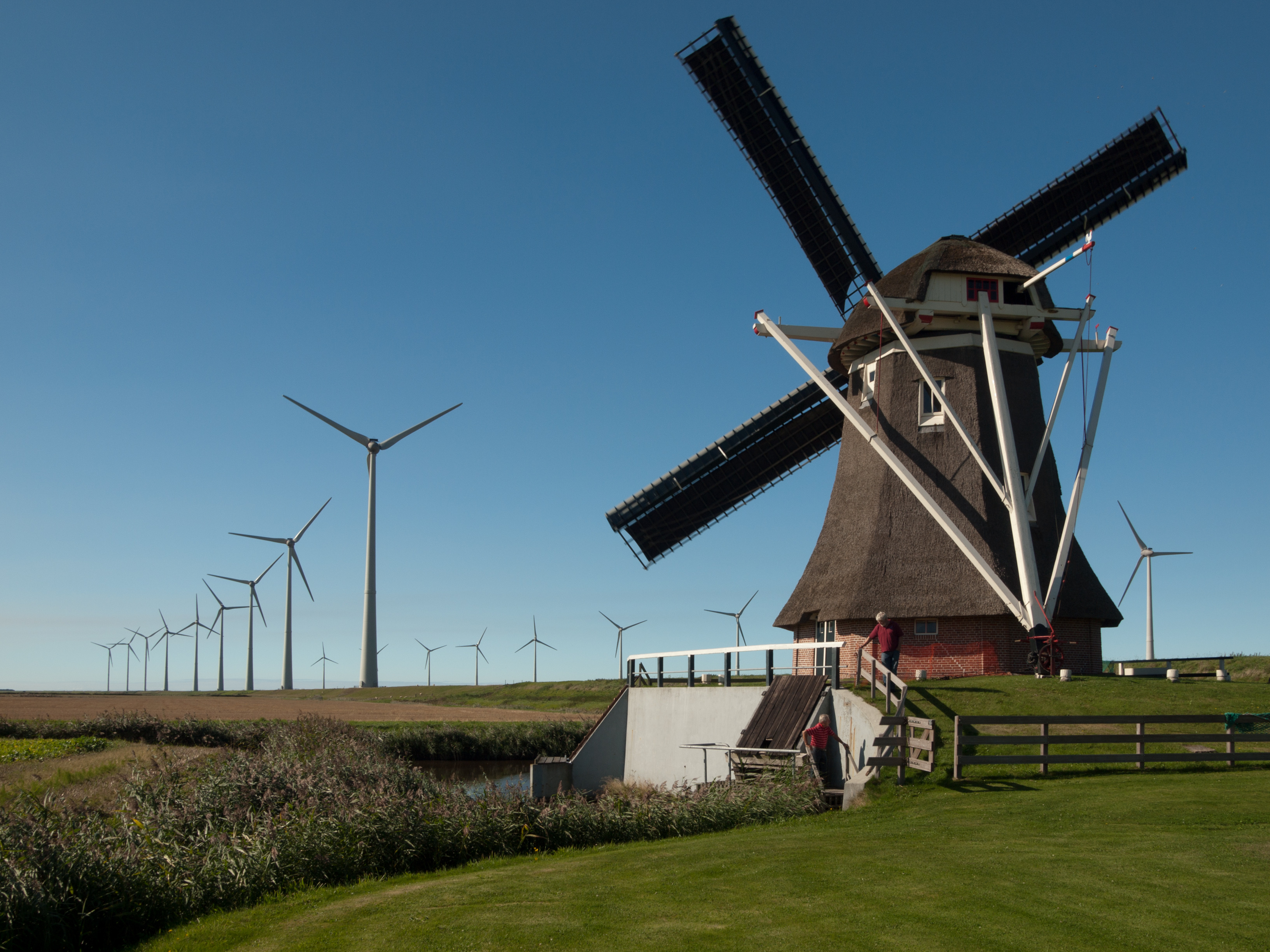
Windmill Goliath in Eemshaven

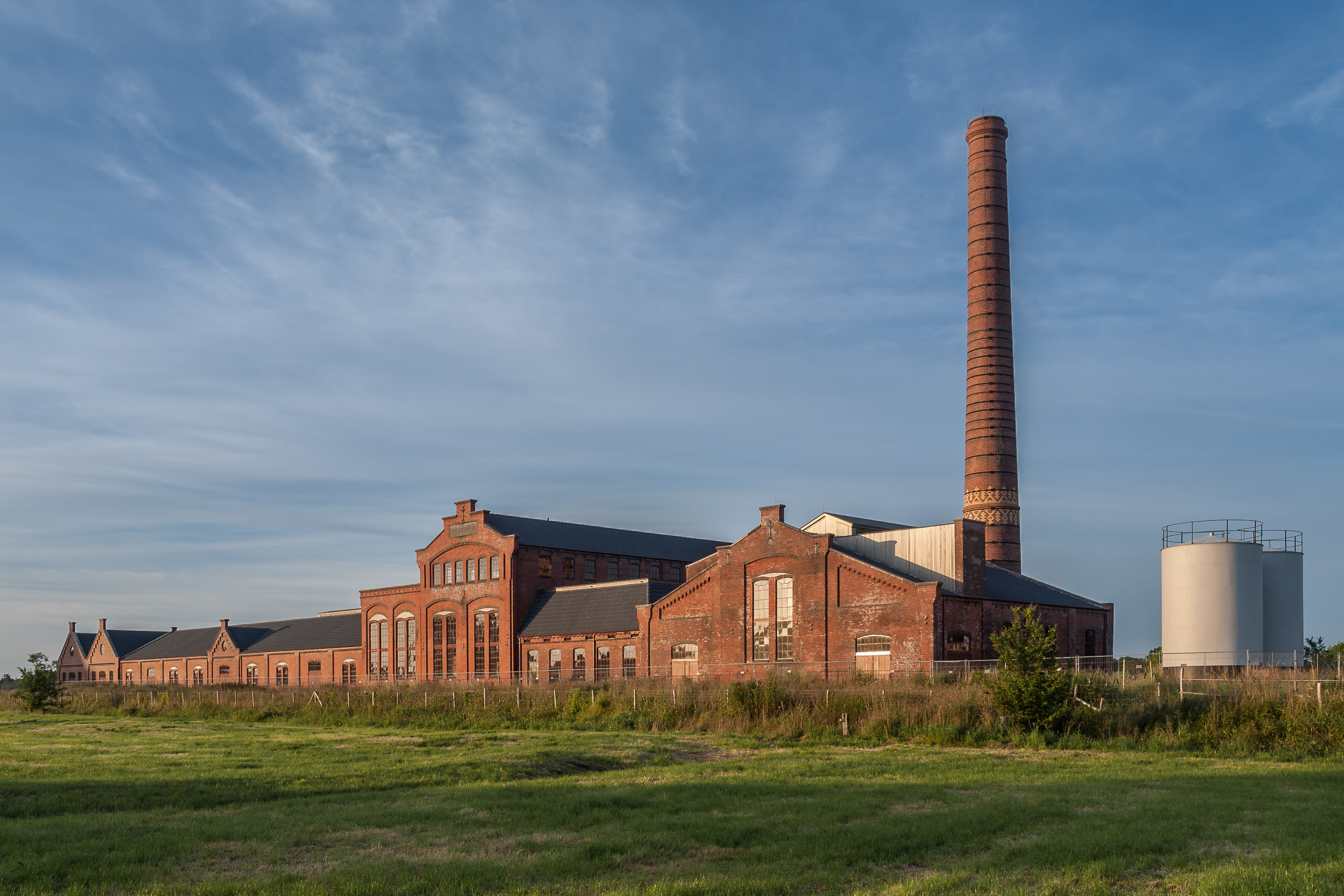
Strawboard factory in Scheemda

=== Sports ===
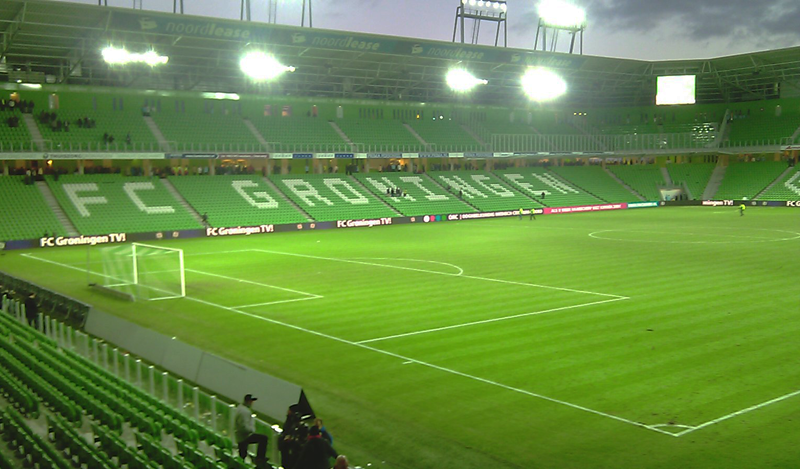
Euroborg is the home stadium of FC Groningen.

FC Groningen from the city of Groningen is the only football club from the province in the Eredivisie. Their home stadium Euroborg has a capacity of 22,550 seats. In the 2012–2013 competition, FC Groningen became 7th of the 18 teams. SC Veendam played in the Eerste Divisie, but filed for bankruptcy in 2013.

The city of Groningen is also the base of basketball club Donar, volleyball club Lycurgus, and korfball club Nic.

The ice rink at the multi-sport center Kardinge in the city of Groningen is used for national speed skating championships, most recently the 2013 KNSB Dutch Sprint Championships.

== Politics ==
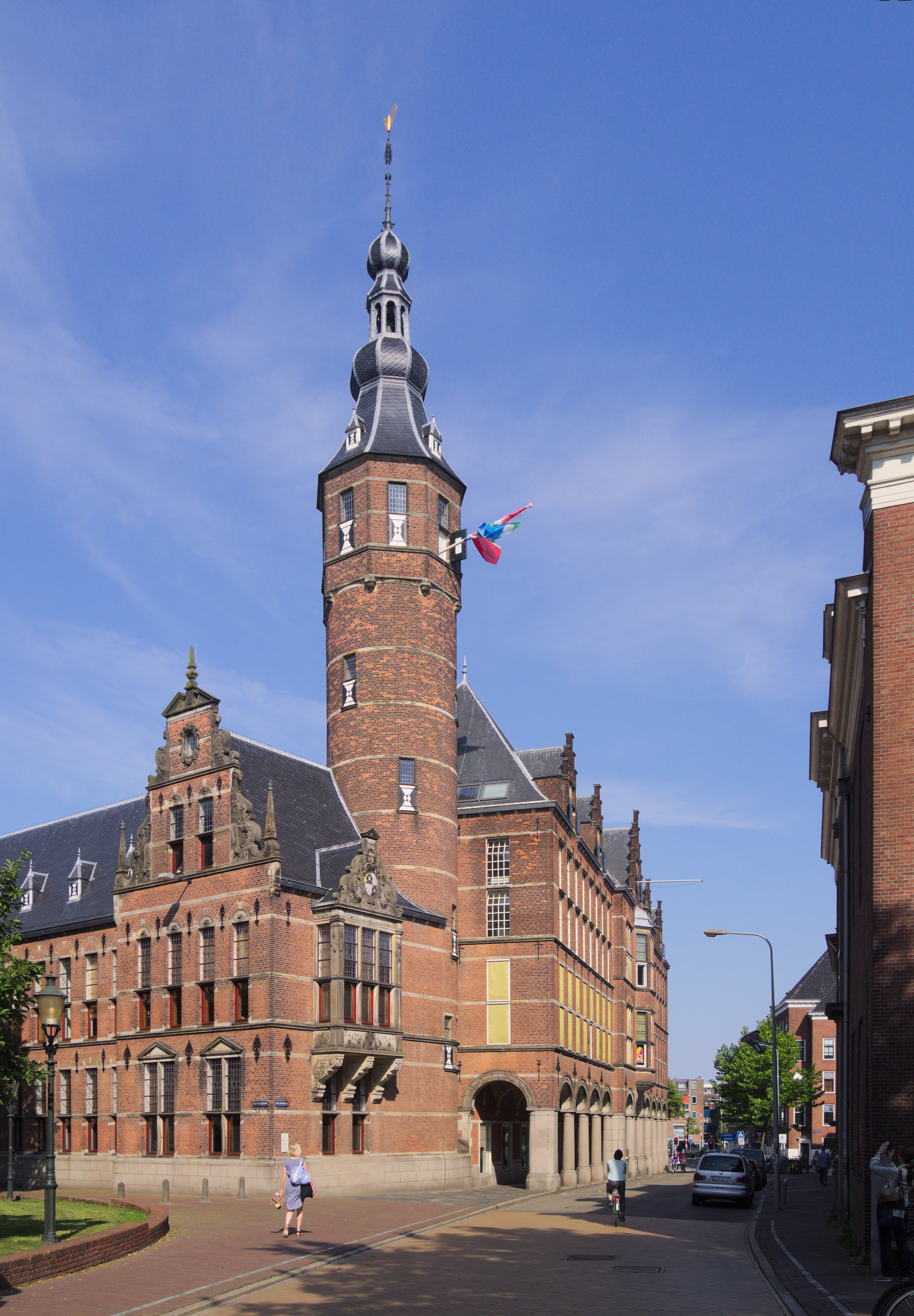
Seat of the provincial government in the city of Groningen

A provincial government in the Netherlands consists of a Provincial Council, the directly elected legislative branch, and a Provincial Executive, the executive branch. The King's Commissioner, who is appointed by the national government, is chairman of both branches. The Provincial Council of Groningen consists of 43 members and the Provincial Executive consists of the King's Commissioner and six deputies. The government has its seat in the city of Groningen, which is the provincial capital.

René Paas, member of the Christian Democratic Appeal (CDA), has been the King's Commissioner since 18 April 2016. He succeeded Max van den Berg who was the King's Commissioner in Groningen from 2007 to 2016.

In the provincial elections of 2011, the Labour Party became the largest party with nearly 25% of the votes and 12 seats in the Provincial Council. The next three largest parties are the People's Party for Freedom and Democracy (VVD) and the Socialist Party (SP) with 6 seats each, and the Christian Democratic Appeal (CDA) with 5 seats. In 2011, two months after the elections, the member of the Party for the North (PvhN) continued as an independent under the name Free Mandate. The next provincial elections are planned for 18 March 2015.

Following the 2011 elections, the Provincial Executive was formed by a coalition of the Labour Party, the People's Party for Freedom and Democracy, Democrats 66 (D66), and GreenLeft (GL). In 2013, GreenLeft left the coalition and was replaced by the ChristianUnion (CU). The Labour Party has three deputies, the other coalition parties have one deputy each.

2015 provincial election
Party	Votes	%	Seats
Socialist Party	39,093	16.19	8
Labour Party	29,711	12.30	6
Christian Democratic Appeal	27,160	11.25	5
Democrats 66	23,422	9.70	4
People's Party for Freedom and Democracy	22,089	9.15	4
Christian Union	21,124	8.75	4
Party for Freedom	19,340	8.01	3
Groninger Belang	15,869	6.57	3
GroenLinks	15,701	6.50	3
Party for the Animals	9,078	3.76	2
Party for the North	5,173	2.14	1
Other parties	13,719	5.68	0
Total	241,479	100	43

== Transportation ==
=== Roads ===
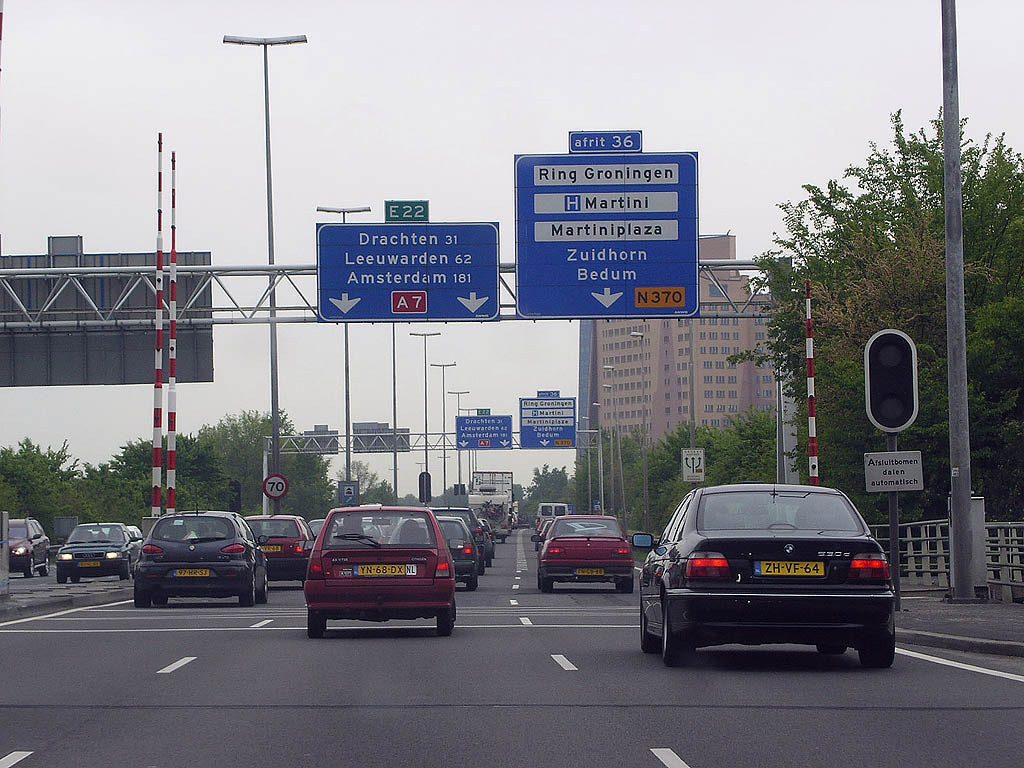
The N7 expressway near the city of Groningen

In the province of Groningen, there are three national roads (Dutch: rijkswegen), which are maintained by Rijkswaterstaat. The motorway A7 (E22) connects the city of Groningen with the provinces of Friesland and North Holland in the west and with Winschoten and Germany in the east. The motorway is interrupted for the ring road of the city of Groningen, where it is the expressway N7. The motorway A28 (E232) starts at the city of Groningen and runs south connecting it with the provinces of Drenthe, Overijssel, Gelderland, and Utrecht. The expressway N33 runs south from Eemshaven, via Appingedam and Veendam, to Drenthe. Other roads are overseen by the province (N roads), municipalities, or water boards.

=== Public transport ===
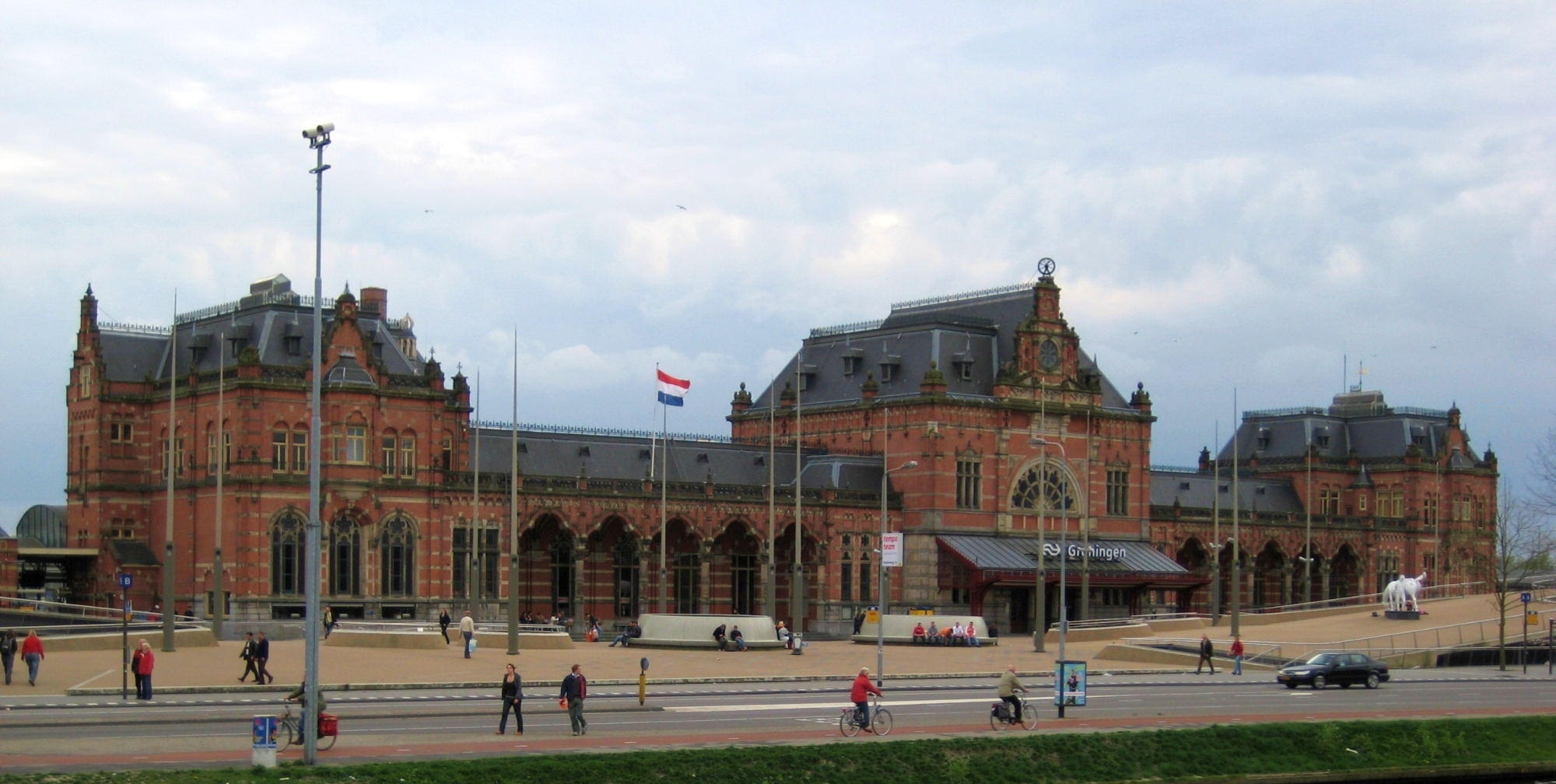
Groningen railway station in 2008

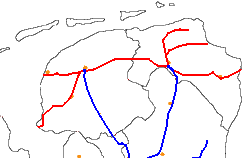
Railways in the northern provinces of the Netherlands in 2006 (without the Stadskanaal–Zuidbroek railway, which partially reopened in 2011)

Public transport falls under the rules for government procurement in the European Union. Tenders for regional bus and railway services are selected by the province of Groningen. Qbuzz is contracted for bus services in the period 2009–2015 and Arriva for railway services in the period 2005–2020. Nederlandse Spoorwegen operates the railway services from Groningen railway station southward to Drenthe and beyond.

The railway network in the Netherlands is maintained by ProRail. There are six railways located partially or entirely in the province of Groningen. The railway station Groningen connects several of these railways.

Trajectory	Railway stations in Groningen
Groningen–Delfzijl	Groningen – Groningen Noord – Sauwerd – Bedum – Stedum – Loppersum – Appingedam – Delfzijl West – Delfzijl
Harlingen–Nieuweschans	Friesland – Grijpskerk – Zuidhorn – Groningen – Groningen Europapark – Kropswolde – Martenshoek – Hoogezand-Sappemeer – Sappemeer Oost – Zuidbroek – Scheemda – Winschoten – Bad Nieuweschans
Ihrhove–Nieuweschans	Germany – Bad Nieuweschans
Meppel–Groningen	Drenthe – Haren – Groningen Europapark – Groningen
Sauwerd–Roodeschool	Sauwerd – Winsum – Baflo – Warffum – Usquert – Uithuizen – Uithuizermeeden – Roodeschool
Stadskanaal–Zuidbroek	Veendam – Zuidbroek

=== Airports ===
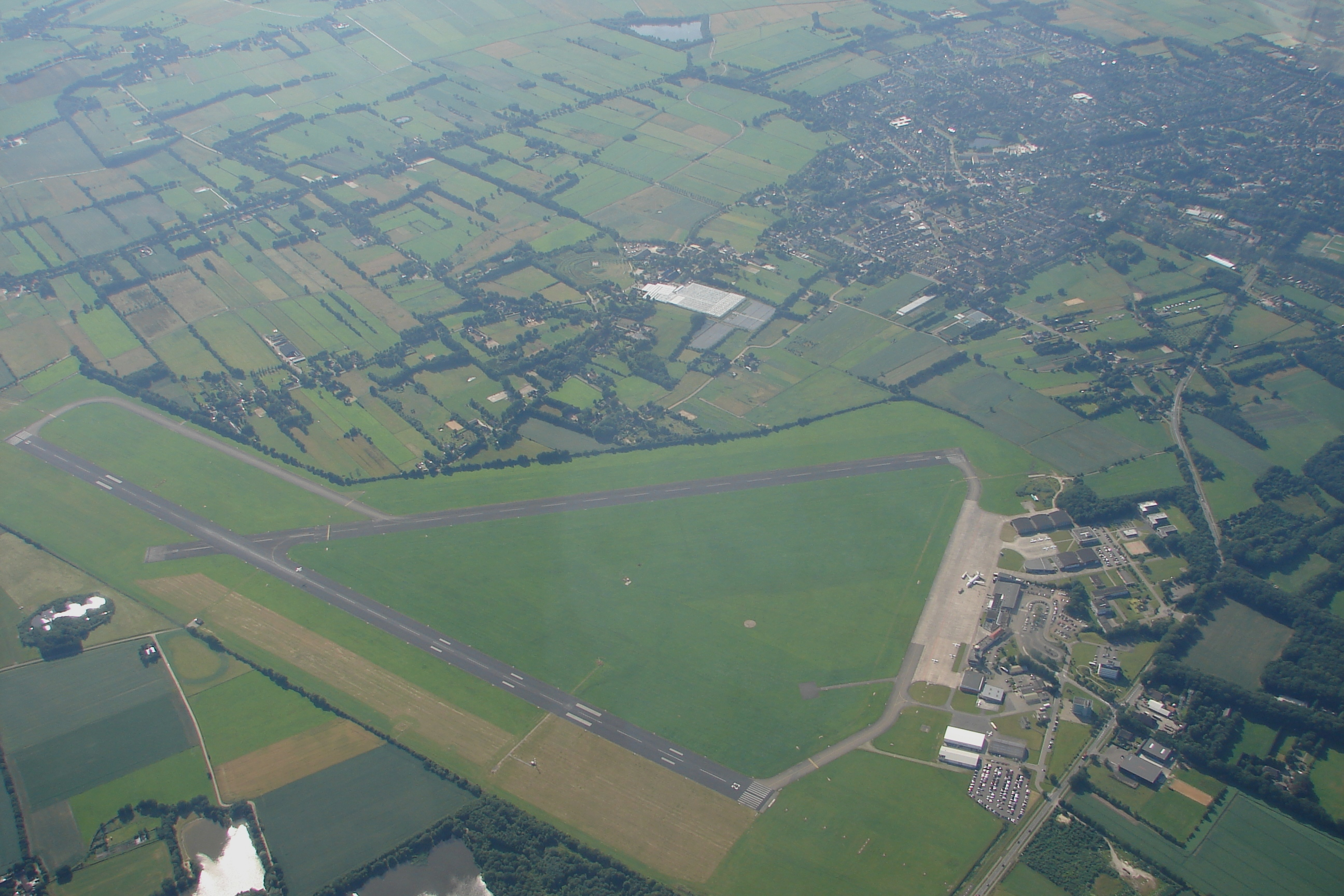
Groningen Airport Eelde is located in Eelde in the province of Drenthe.

The international airport that serves Groningen is Groningen Airport Eelde, which is located in Eelde in the province of Drenthe. The airport is co-owned by the provinces of Groningen and Drenthe and the municipalities of Groningen, Assen, and Tynaarlo. Its summer destinations are Antalya, Faro, Girona, Gran Canaria, Heraklion, Kos, Palma de Mallorca, and Tenerife. Its winter destinations are Innsbruck and Salzburg. Starting on 5 June 2014, there will also be flights to London. For other international destinations, Amsterdam Airport Schiphol is the nearest airport. The general aviation airports in the province are Oostwold Airport in Oostwold and Stadskanaal Airfield in Stadskanaal.

== Science and education ==
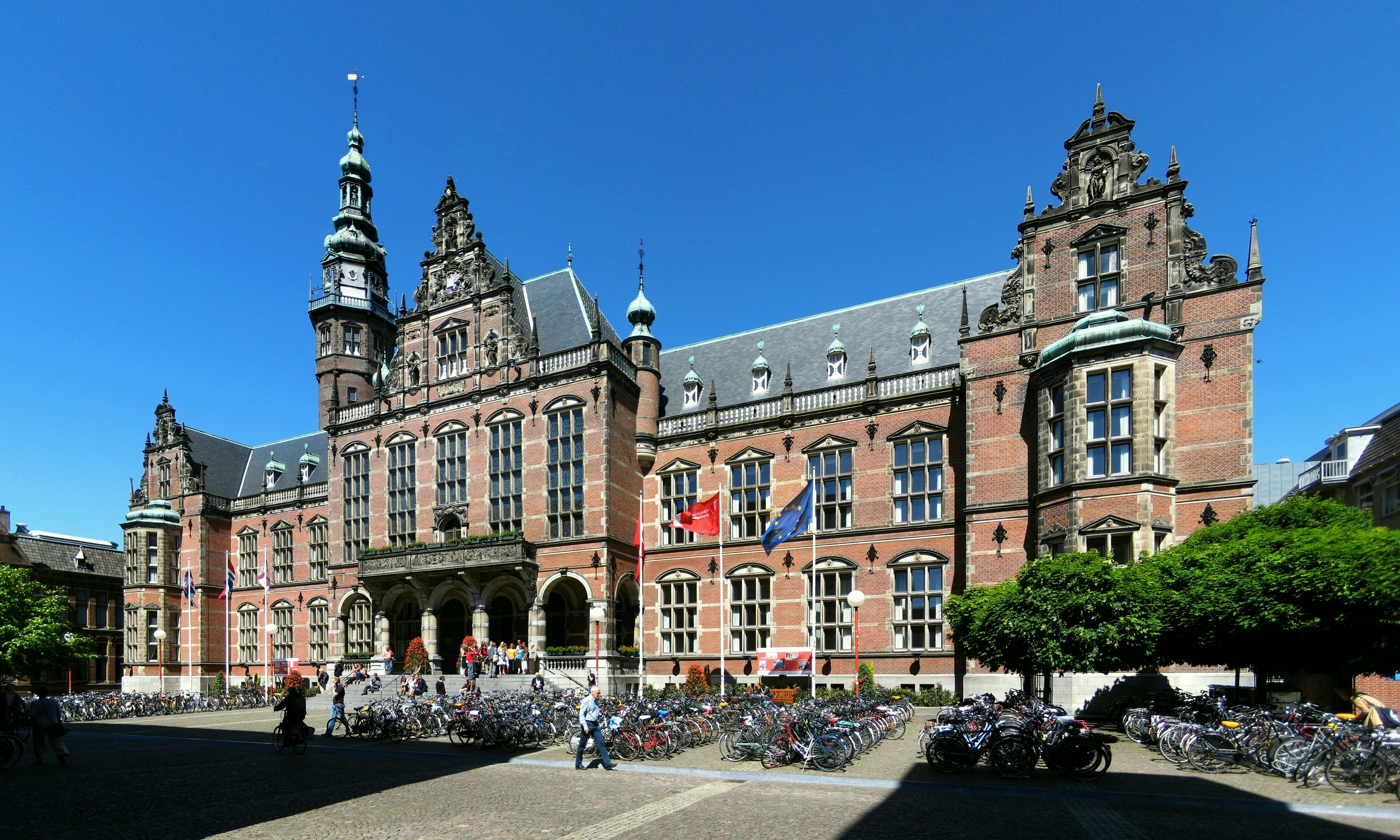
Main building of the University of Groningen in the city of Groningen

The University of Groningen in the city of Groningen was founded in 1614 and is the only research university (universiteit) in the province. On 1 September 2013, it had 29,407 students and 5,238 full-time equivalent of staff members. The university has ten faculties: Arts, Behavioural and Social Sciences, Economics and Business, Law, Mathematics and Natural Sciences, Medical Sciences, Philosophy, Spatial Sciences, Theology and Religious Studies, and University College Groningen.

The Hanze University of Applied Sciences, the NHL University of Applied Sciences, and the Stenden University of Applied Sciences in the city of Groningen are the province's publicly funded universities of applied sciences (hogescholen).

== Media ==
The Dagblad van het Noorden is a regional daily newspaper based in the city of Groningen and is owned by NDC Mediagroep. It was founded in 2002 by merging the Nieuwsblad van het Noorden, the Groninger Dagblad, and the Drentse Courant. In 2015, the newspaper had a circulation of 96,515.

RTV Noord is a regional public broadcaster of radio and television based in the city of Groningen, with Radio Noord and TV Noord. Their radio station has 121,000 daily listeners and a market share of 28% (2012) and their TV station has 171,000 daily viewers and a market share of 26.7% (2012).

== Notable residents ==
Politics

- Sicco Mansholt, politician and president of the EC
- Dirk Jan de Geer, prime minister
- Johan Remkes, King's Commissioner and minister
- Henk Bleker, state secretary
- Sharon Dijksma, state secretary
- Diederik Samsom, politician
- Klaas Knot, president of De Nederlandsche Bank
- Pete Hoekstra, US politician

Arts

- Wim Crouwel, graphic designer
- Cornelis Dopper, conductor and composer
- Albert Eckhout, painter
- Ede Staal, singer-songwriter
- Jozef Israëls, painter
- Freek de Jonge, cabaret artist
- Gerrit Krol, writer
- Wim T. Schippers, artist, comedian, and actor
- Hendrik Willem Mesdag, painter
- Willem Frederik Hermans, writer
- Jan Altink, painter

Science

- Daniel Bernoulli, mathematician
- Heike Kamerlingh Onnes, physicist and Nobel laureate
- Johan Huizinga, historian

Sports

- Jurrie Koolhof, football striker
- Jan Mulder, football player
- Arjen Robben, footballer
- Renate Groenewold, speedskater
- Ranomi Kromowidjojo, swimmer
- Jaap Eden, speedskater
- Laurens ten Dam, road bicycle racing

Other

- Abel Tasman, explorer
- Wiebbe Hayes, a soldier and national hero in the 17th century
- Lenie 't Hart, animal rights activist
- Aletta Jacobs, first woman to study medicine in the Netherlands
- Wubbo Ockels, austronaut
- Ad van Luyn, bishop emeritus of Rotterdam

== See also ==
- Gronings dialect
- Hoogholtje bridge
