= Roodeschool =

- Village
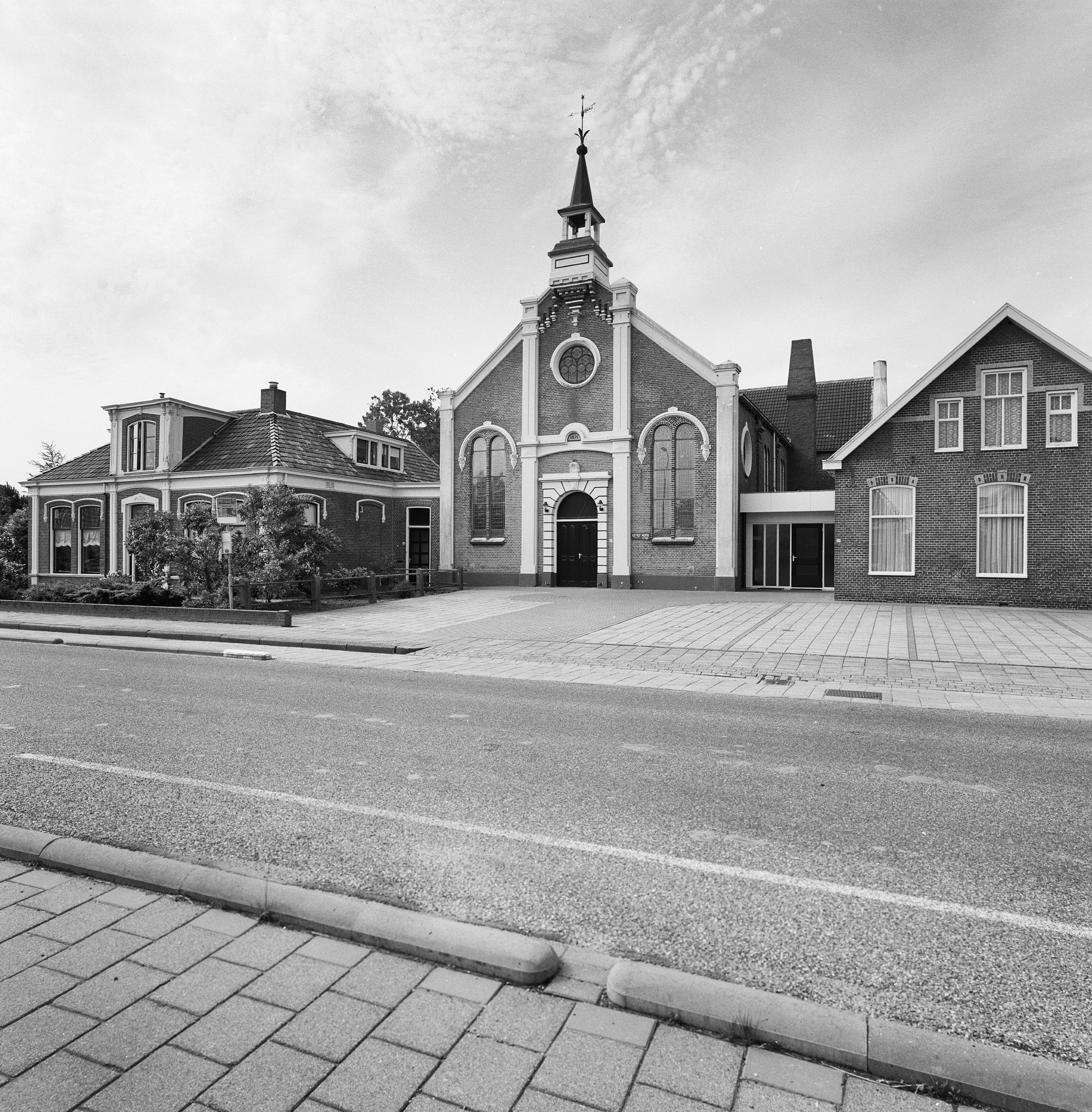
- Roodeschool in 1998

- Location of Roodeshcool in the province of Groningen
- Coordinates: 53°25′14″N 6°45′49″E
- Country: Netherlands
- Province: Groningen
- Municipality: Het Hogeland

Area
  - Total: 0.60 km^{2} (0.23 sq mi)
- Elevation: 1.3 m (4.3 ft)

Population (2021)
  - Total: 845
  - Density: 1,400/km^{2} (3,600/sq mi)
- Time zone: UTC+1 (CET)
  - Summer (DST): UTC+2 (CEST)
- Postal code: 9983
- Dialing code: 0595

Roodeschool (Gronings: Roschoul) is a community situated in the northeast of Groningen province in the Netherlands and forming part of the municipality of Het Hogeland. It had a population of around 860 in January 2017.

Roodeschool's railway station is the second northernmost in the Netherlands and forms part of the Groningen-Roodeschool railway line.

The name, which means "red school", is derived from the local noteworthiness of the red roof tiles of a village school which once stood in the vicinity.

== History ==
It was part of Uithuizermeeden municipality before 1979, when it became part of Hefshuizen.

== Transportation ==
In 1893, the Roodeschool railway station was built on the Sauwerd to Roodeschool railway line. Roodeschool used to be the end of the line, but in 2018, the line was extended to Eemshaven railway station.

== Gallery ==
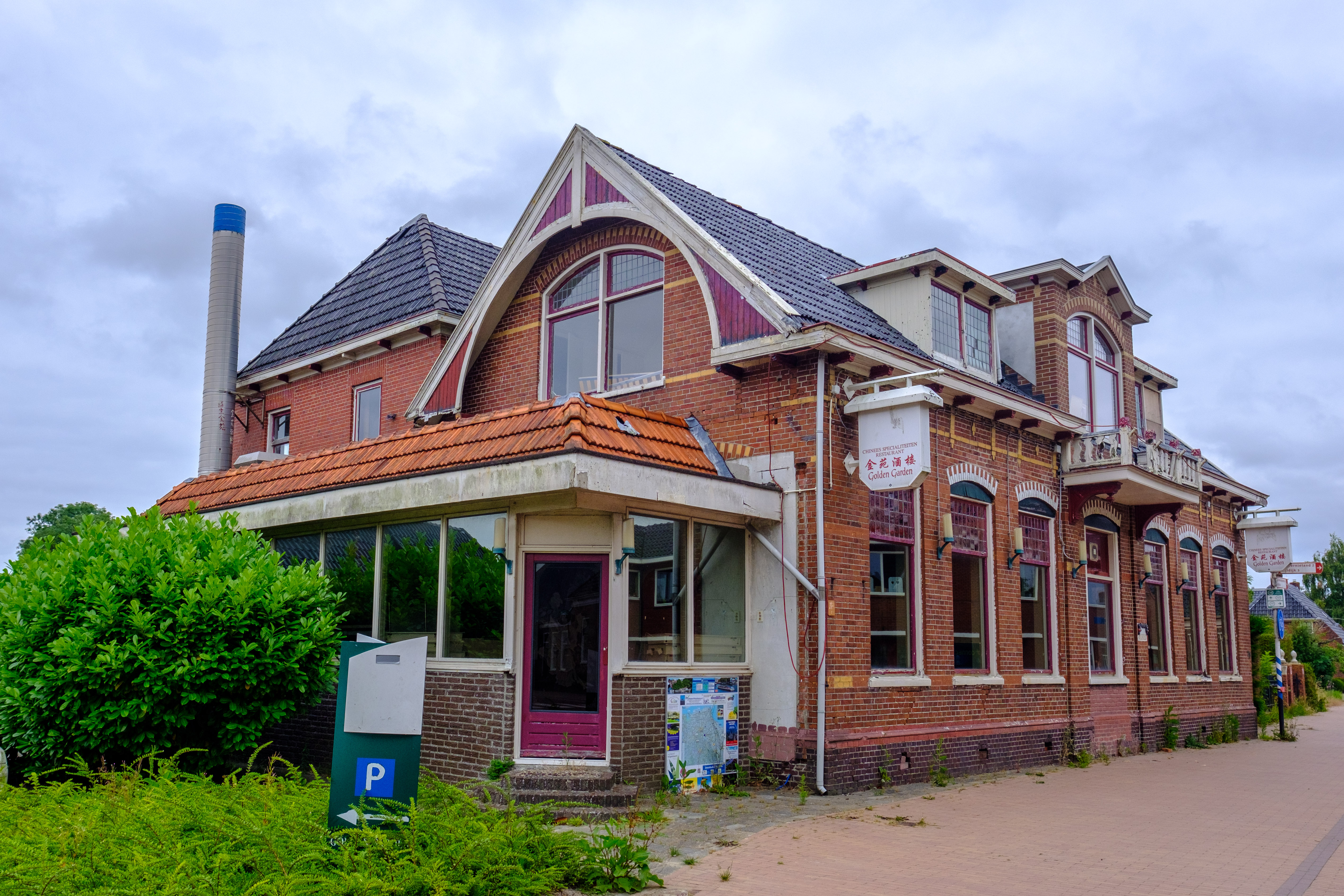
Chinese restaurant in Roodeschool

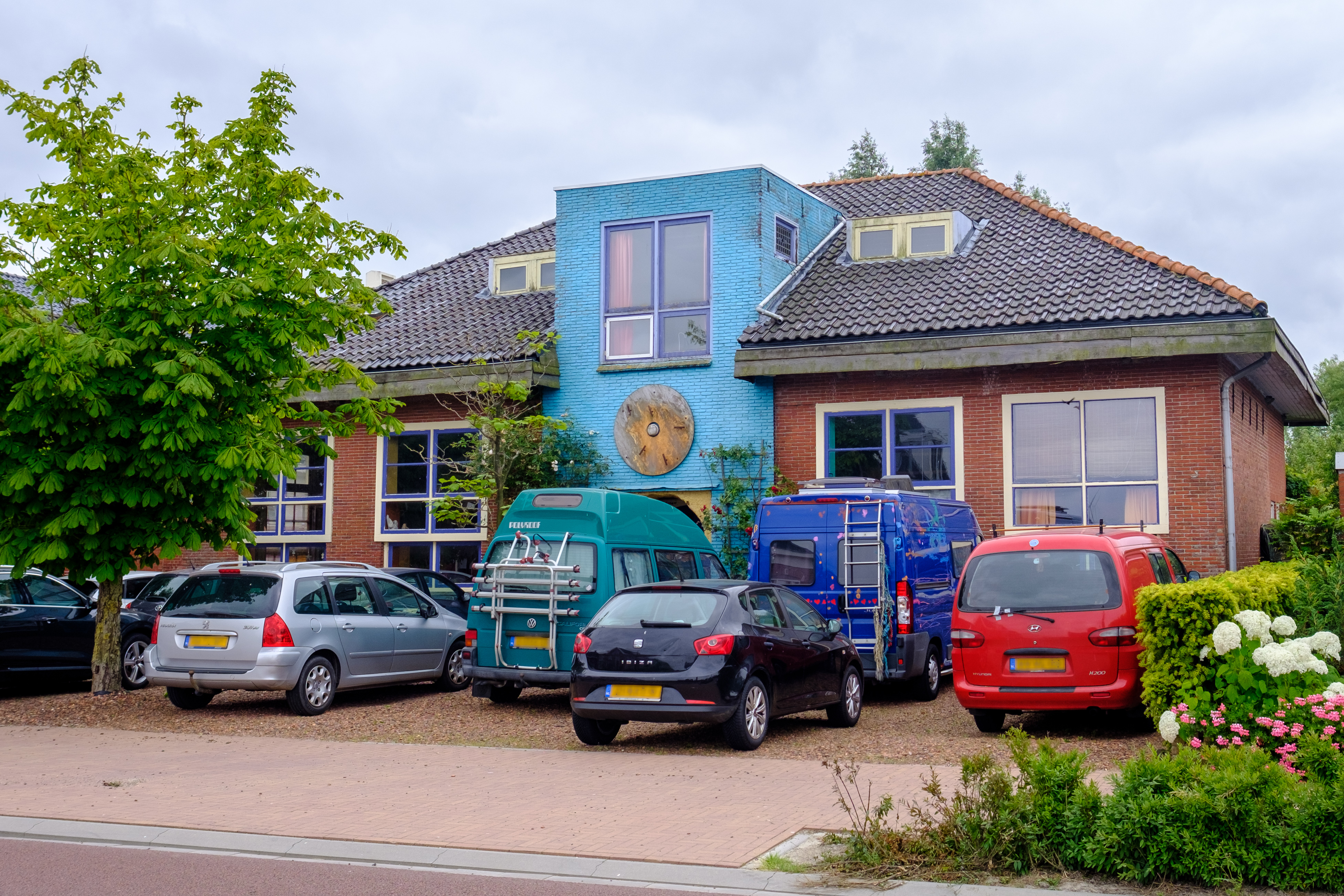
School

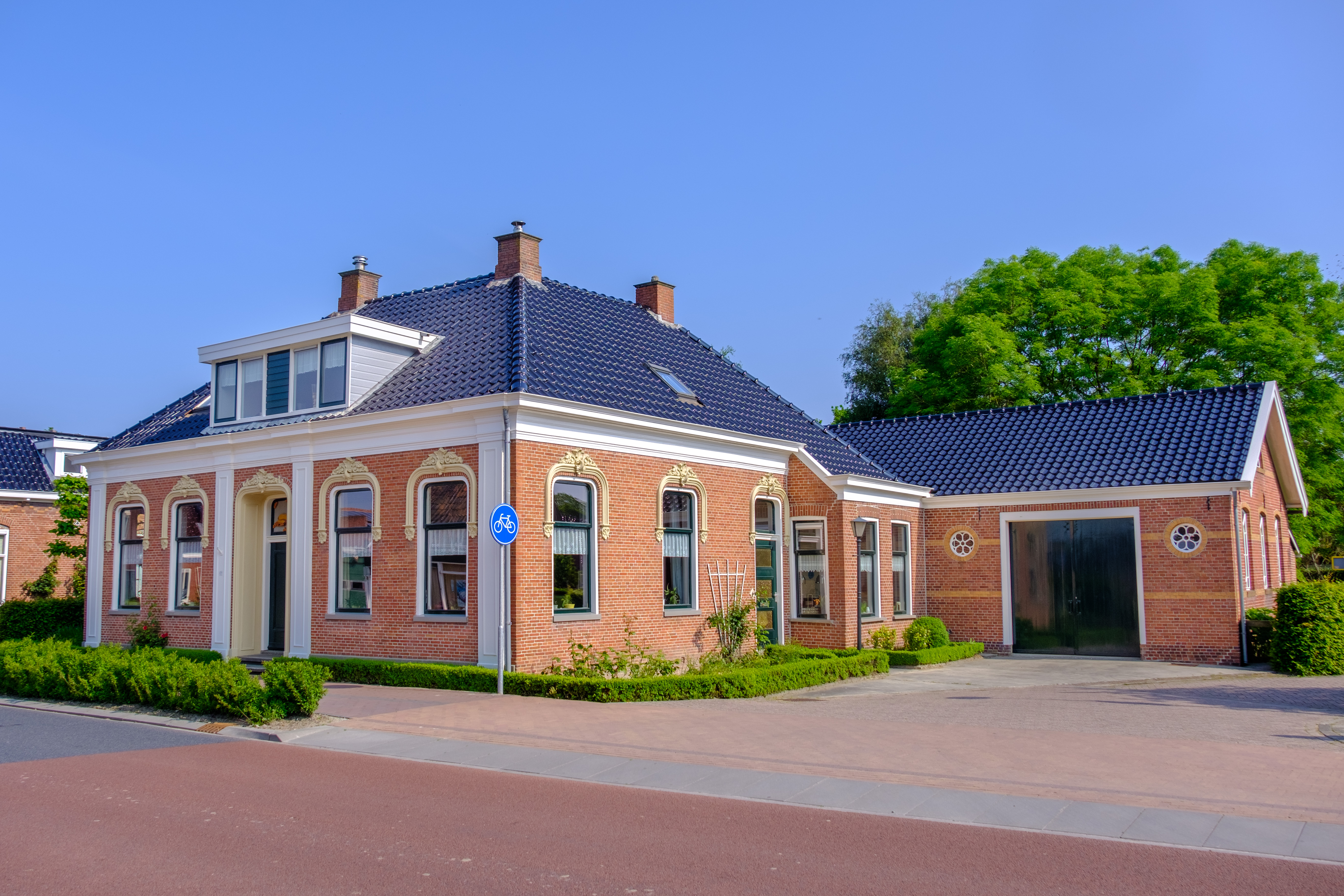
House in Roodeschool

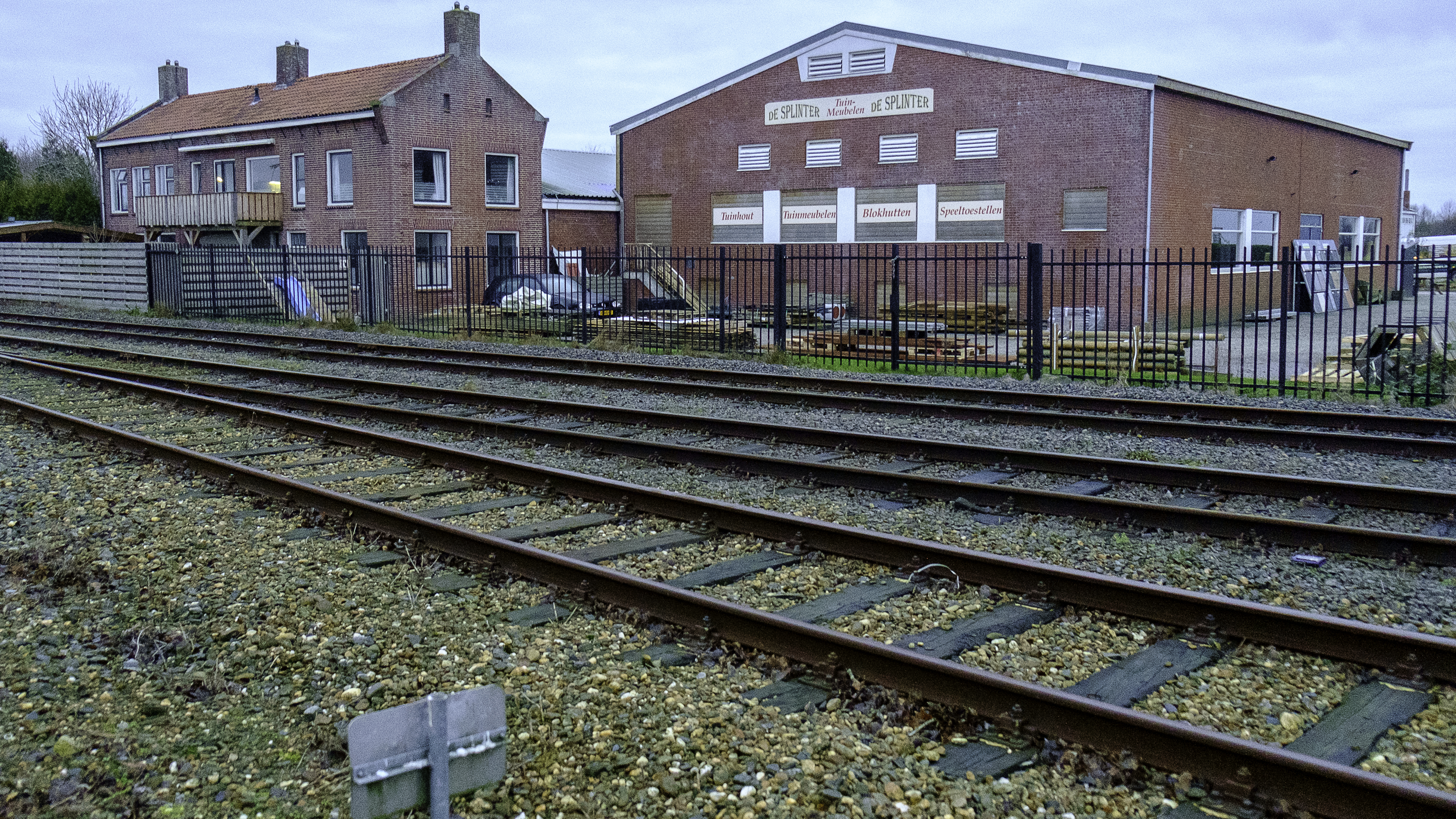
Garden furniture store
