= Uithuizermeeden railway station =

Railway station in the Netherlands

Uithuizermeeden
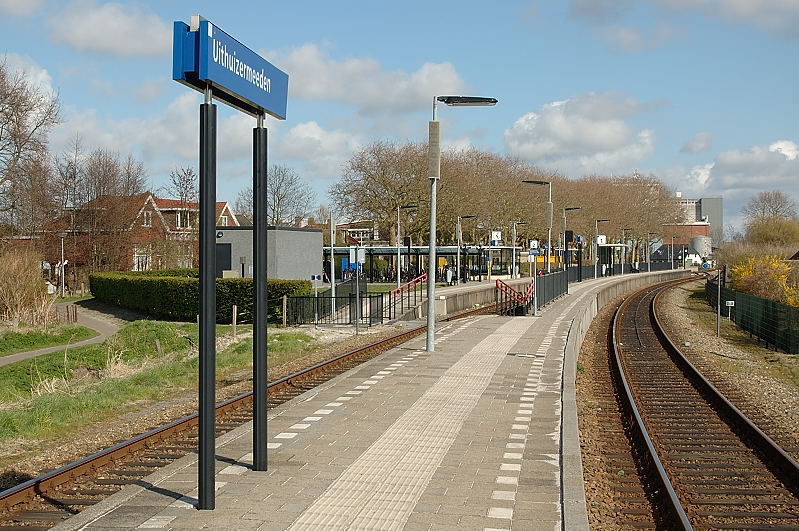

General information
- Location: Netherlands
- Coordinates: 53°24′49″N 6°43′15″E
- Line: Sauwerd–Roodeschool railway

History
- Opened: 16 August 1893

Services
Preceding station	Arriva Netherlands	Following station
Uithuizen towards Groningen	Stoptrein 37600	Roodeschool towards Eemshaven
Location
- Location within Netherlands

Uithuizermeeden is a railway station located in Uithuizermeeden, The Netherlands. The station was opened on 16 August 1893 and is located on the Sauwerd–Roodeschool railway. The services are operated by Arriva.

== Train service ==
The following services currently call at Uithuizermeeden:

- 2x per hour local service (stoptrein) Groningen - Roodeschool
