= Uithuizen railway station =

Railway station in the Netherlands

Uithuizen
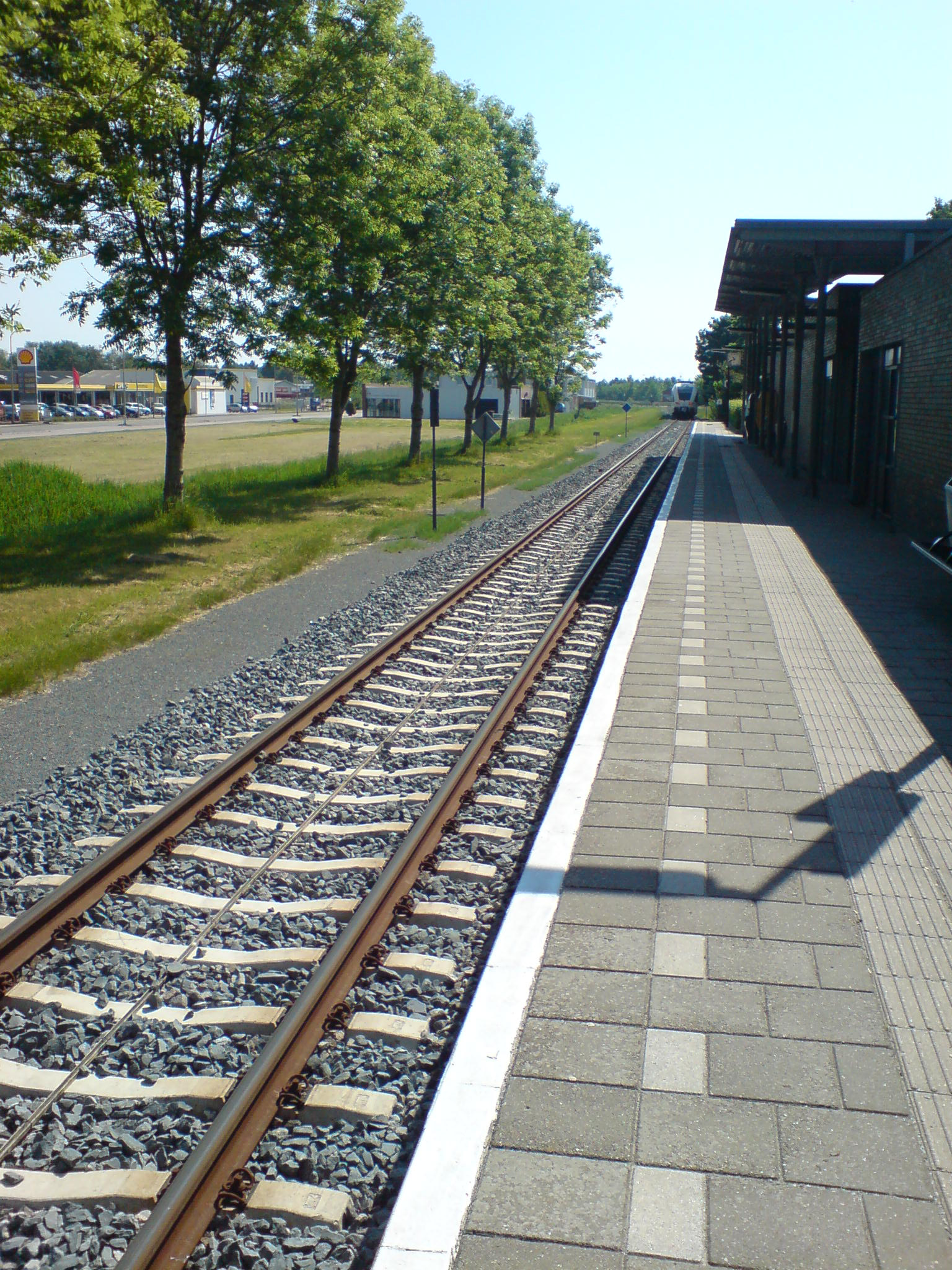
- Uithuizen railway station in 2012

General information
- Location: Uithuizen, Netherlands
- Coordinates: 53°24′34″N 6°40′28″E
- Line: Sauwerd–Roodeschool railway

Other information
- Station code: Uhz

History
- Opened: 16 August 1893

Key dates
- 1973: Station building demolished
- 2000: New station building built

Services
Preceding station	Arriva Netherlands	Following station
Usquert towards Groningen	Stoptrein 37600	Uithuizermeeden towards Eemshaven
Location
- Location within Netherlands

Uithuizen (abbreviation: Uhz) is a railway station located in Uithuizen in the Netherlands. The station is located on the Sauwerd–Roodeschool railway. The train services are operated by Arriva.

== History ==
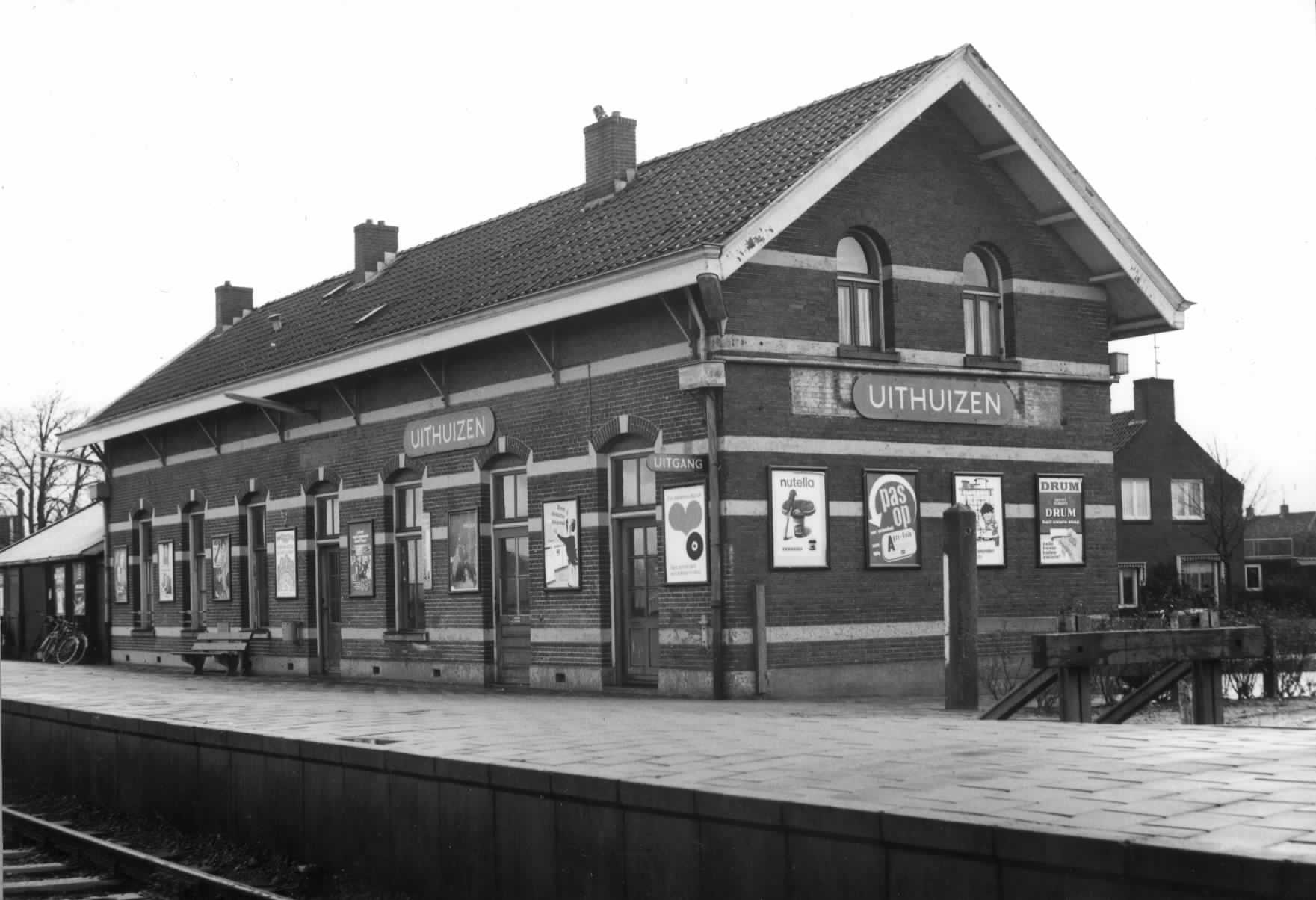
The station in 1970

Uithuizen opened on 16 August 1893.

In 1973 the station buildings were demolished and later were replaced by a waiting shelter.

A new station building was built in 2000. The current building is not part of the railway station, and instead is used as a sports centre for the village.

The station has, in the past, been subjected to vandalism.

In 2015 artwork by local children was put up in the waiting room, this was done as part of a trial to prevent vandalism.

In 2023 Uithuizen received the lowest passenger satisfaction rating of all the railway stations in Groningen.

In 2024 Uithuizen received the second lowest passenger satisfaction rating of all the railway stations in Groningen.

== Facilities ==
The station has a waiting room, locker for bicycles, and a ticket machine.

== Services ==
=== Trains ===
The following services currently call at Uithuizen:

- 2x per hour local service (stoptrein) Groningen - Roodeschool

=== Buses ===
- 61 - Delfzijl - Appingedam - Holwierde - Spijk - Roodeschool - Uithuizermeeden - Uithuizen - Usquert - Rottum - Middelstum - Bedum - Zuidwolde - Groningen (Hourly)
- 62 - Uithuizen - Zandeweer - Eppenhuizen - Garsthuizen - Westeremden - Loppersum (Taxibus)
- 562 - Uithuizen - Zandeweer - Eppenhuizen - Garsthuizen - Loppersum (Schoolbus)
