= Roodeschool railway station =

Railway station in Roodeschool, Netherlands

Roodeschool
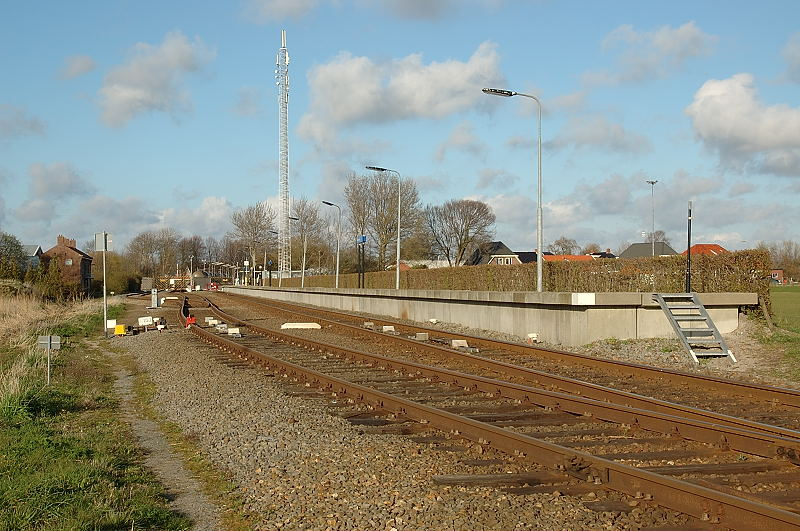

General information
- Location: Roodeschool, Netherlands
- Coordinates: 53°25′07″N 6°45′34″E
- Line: Sauwerd–Roodeschool railway

Other information
- Station code: Rd

History
- Opened: 16 August 1893

Services
Preceding station	Arriva Netherlands	Following station
Uithuizermeeden towards Groningen	Stoptrein 37600	Eemshaven Terminus
Location
- Location within Netherlands

Roodeschool is a railway station located in Roodeschool, Netherlands. The station was opened on 16 August 1893 and is located at the end of the Sauwerd–Roodeschool railway. The train services are operated by Arriva.

For well over a century, Roodeschool was the northernmost station in the Netherlands, until 28 March 2018, when further along the line, the station Eemshaven was opened, slightly more north. At the same date, the old, head-end station, was closed and a new station for Roodeschool was opened, allowing trains to continue to Eemshaven.

== Train service ==
The following services call at Roodeschool:

- Twice per hour (once per hour on Sundays) local service (stoptrein) Groningen - Roodeschool
