= Winsum railway station =

Railway station in Winsum, Netherlands

Winsum
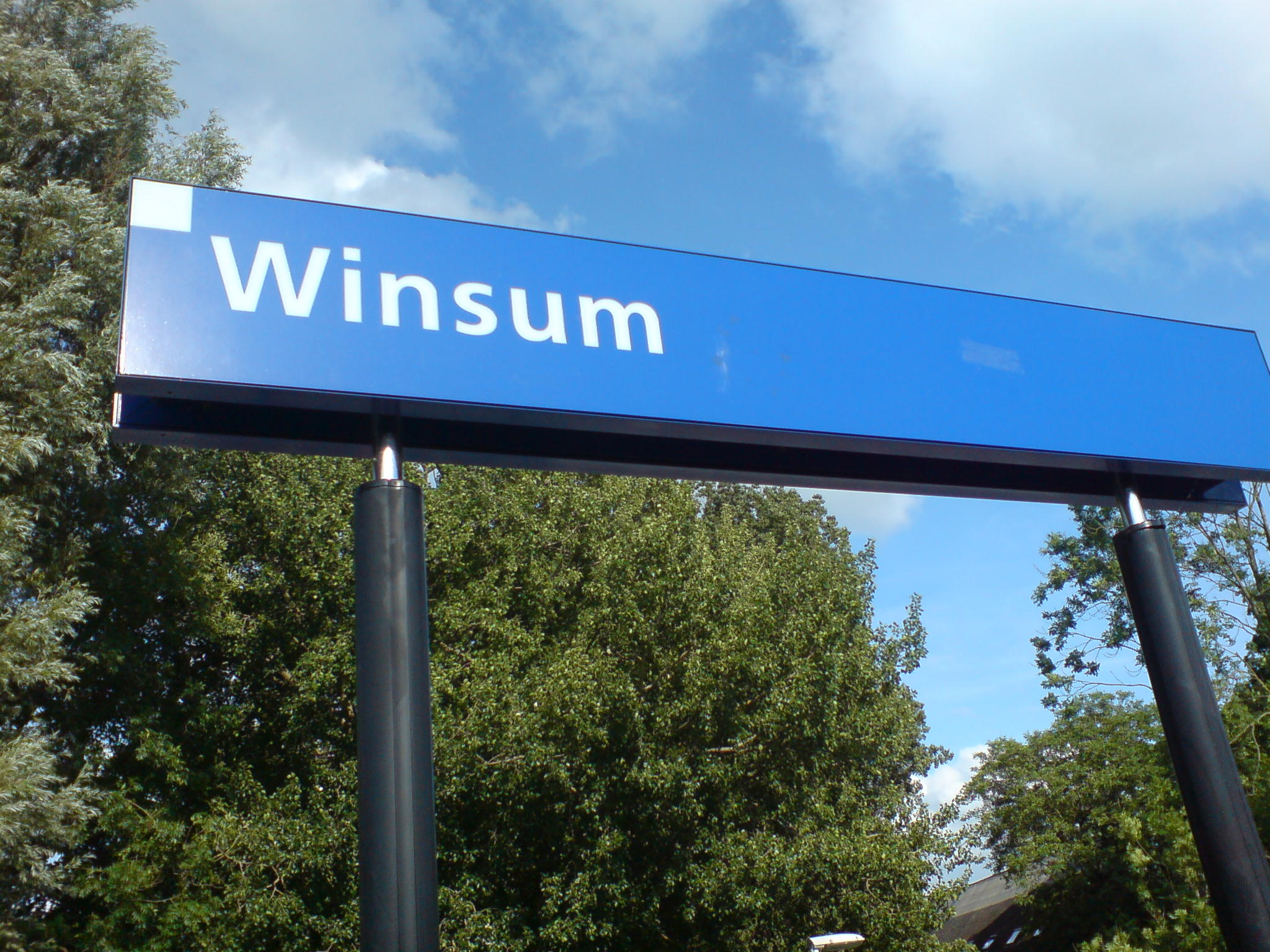
- Sign at the Winsum railway station in 2012

General information
- Location: Netherlands
- Coordinates: 53°19′48″N 6°31′12″E
- Line: Sauwerd–Roodeschool railway

History
- Opened: 16 August 1893

Services
Preceding station	Arriva Netherlands	Following station
Sauwerd towards Groningen	Stoptrein 37600	Baflo towards Eemshaven
Location
- Location within Netherlands

Winsum is a railway station located in Winsum, The Netherlands. The station was opened on 16 August 1893 and is located on the Sauwerd–Roodeschool railway. The train services are operated by Arriva.

== Services ==
=== Trains ===
The following services currently call at Winsum:

- 2x per hour local service (stoptrein) Groningen - Roodeschool

=== Buses ===
These services are operated by Qbuzz:

- 65 - Zoutkamp - Ulrum - Leens - Wehe-den Hoorn - Eenrum - Mensingeweer - Winsum - Sauwerd - Adorp - Groningen (Hourly)
- 67 - Winsum - Mensingeweer - Eenrum - Wehe den Hoorn - Kloosterburen - Hornhuizen (Hourly, only during rush hours)
- 165 - Groningen - Adorp - Sauwerd - Winsum - Mensingeweer - Wehe-den Hoorn - Leens - Ulrum - Zoutkamp (Hourly, only during rush hours)

These services are operated by UVO:

- 36 - Winsum - Garnwerd - Feerwerd - Ezinge - Saaksum - Oldehove (Hourly)
- 68 - Winsum - Baflo - Den Andel - Westernieland - Pieterburen - Molenrij - Kloosterburen - Kruisweg -

Hornhuizen - Leens (Hourly)

This service is operated by Arriva:

- 665 - Winsum - Sauwerd - Adorp - Groningen, Zernike Campus (1x per day)

Service 163 (Qbuzz) from Groningen via Lauwersoog to Holwerd used to stop at the station, but since 2011 it skips the station.

== Accidents and incidents ==
- On 25 July 1980, two passenger trains were in a head-on collision near Winsum. Nine people were killed, 21 were injured.
- On 19 November 2016, a passenger train was in collision with a milk lorry on a level crossing near Winsum and was derailed. Eighteen people were injured, three seriously.
