= Eemshaven railway station =

Railway station in Groningen, Netherlands

Eemshaven
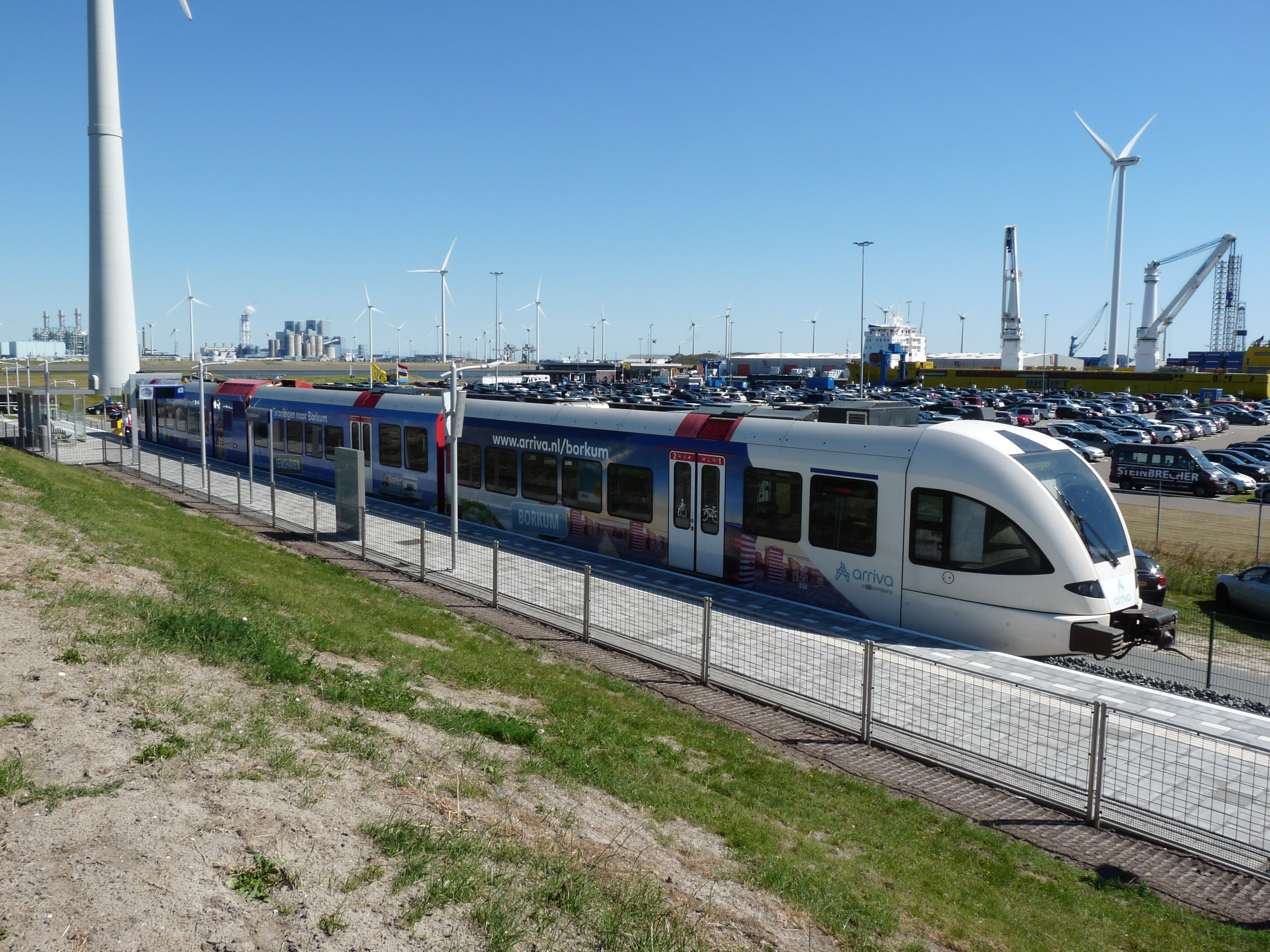

General information
- Location: Eemshaven, Netherlands
- Coordinates: 53°25′59″N 6°45′59″E
- Line: Sauwerd–Roodeschool railway

Other information
- Station code: Eem

History
- Opened: 28 March 2018

Services
Preceding station	Arriva Netherlands	Following station
Roodeschool towards Groningen	Stoptrein 37600	Terminus
Location
- Location within Netherlands

Eemshaven railway station is a train station on the Sauwerd–Roodeschool railway, located in the Eemshaven harbour in the province of Groningen, Netherlands. It is the northernmost train station in the country.

The station was opened on 28 March 2018 although an official inauguration by King Willem-Alexander of the Netherlands took place on 20 June 2018. The station is mainly used by ferry passengers to the German island of Borkum. Train services were initially very limited to only a few trains a day, connecting to this ferry service. The existing bus connection to the city of Groningen was cancelled in favour of the train connection. Additionally, some harbour workers may use the train service; despite the remote location, its use for commuting has become more common since Arriva increased the service frequency.

The 4.7 kilometers long railway line to Eemshaven has existed since 1978 but was initially only in use for cargo trains. This existing part was made suitable for passenger traffic with another 3 kilometres of tracks newly built in order to reach the ferry terminal.

While it was initially planned that trains would only call at Eemshaven at ferry times, carrier Arriva implemented services to the station every half hour instead. The other trains end at Roodeschool.

Oxford University student society Jet Lag: Oxford, inspired by Jet Lag: The Game, used this station as the starting point for their race to Rumelange, Luxembourg.
