= Sauwerd–Roodeschool railway =

Railway line in the Netherlands

Sauwerd-Eemshaven railway
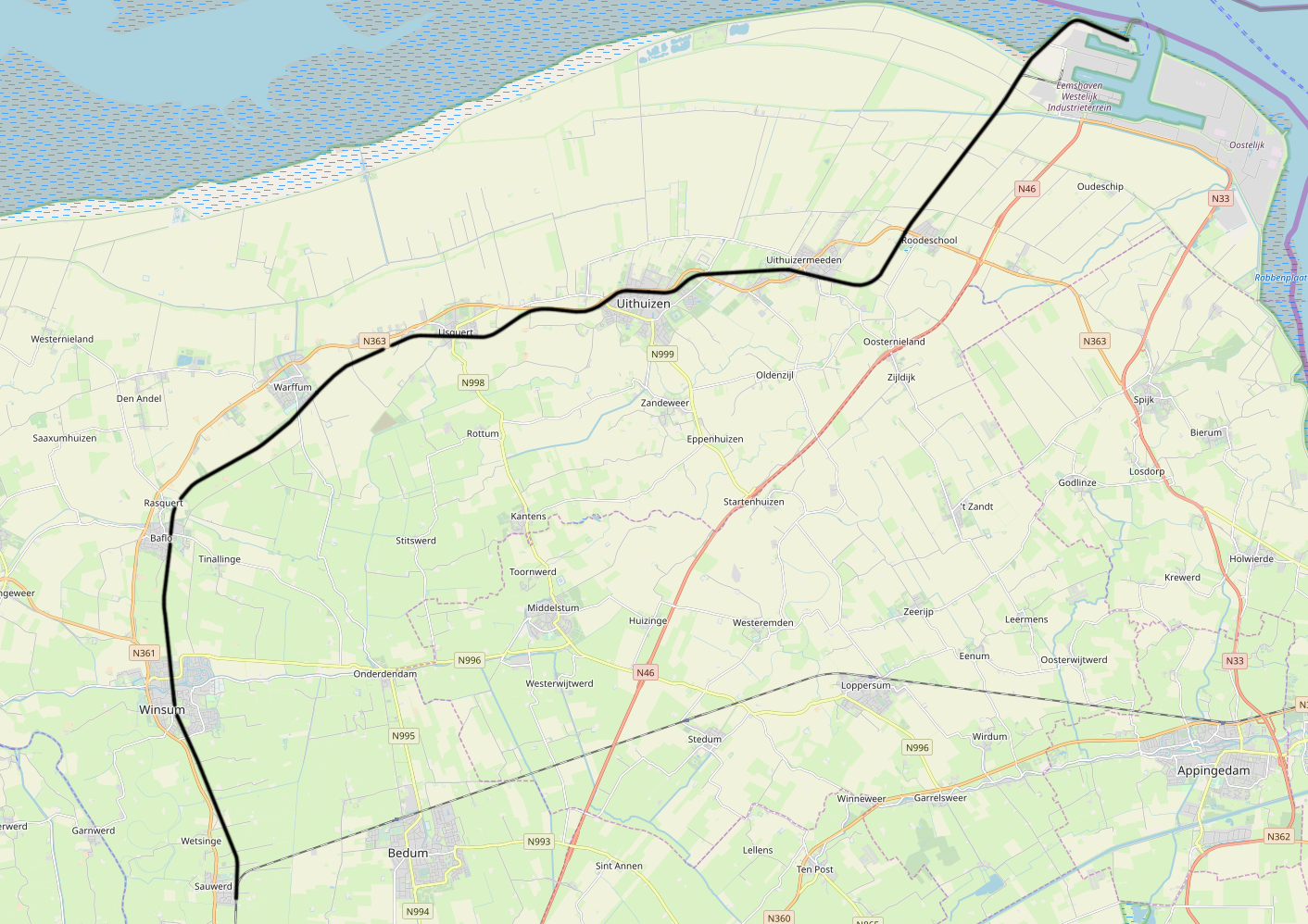

Overview
- Status: Operational
- Locale: The Netherlands
- Termini: Sauwerd railway station; Roodeschool railway station
- Stations: 9

History
- Opened: August 16, 1893

Technical
- Line length: 26.9 km (16.7 mi)
- Number of tracks: mostly single track
- Track gauge: 1,435 mm (4 ft 8 1/2 in) standard gauge
- Electrification: no

The Sauwerd–Roodeschool railway is a railway line in the Netherlands running from Sauwerd to Roodeschool, passing through Winsum, Warffum and Uithuizen. The line was opened in 1893. Although the railway originally started in Sauwerd, train services have always started and terminated in Groningen. At 28 March 2018, an extra branch from Roodeschool to Eemshaven was opened.

== Stations ==
The main interchange stations on the railway are:

- Sauwerd: to Delfzijl
- Winsum: bus services 36, 65, 67, 68 and 165
- Uithuizen: bus services 61, 62 and 662
- Roodeschool: bus services 61

On the Eemshaven branch:

- Eemshaven: ferry to Borkum

== History ==
On the early morning of July 15, 1980 a severe accident took place between Winsum and Sauwerd. A train from Groningen left Sauwerd with a few minutes delay, the traffic controller asked the train to Groningen to wait for the train from Groningen to arrive at Winsum, but the traindriver didn't wait. Both trains collided just outside Winsum, killing 9 and injuring 21.

== Trainservice ==
Services are operated by Arriva. From Monday to Saturday trains run 2x per hour between 5am and 8pm, with two extra trains running between Groningen and Warffum on weekday mornings. On all other times trains run 1x per hour.
