= Delfzijl West railway station =

Railway station in the Netherlands

Delfzijl West
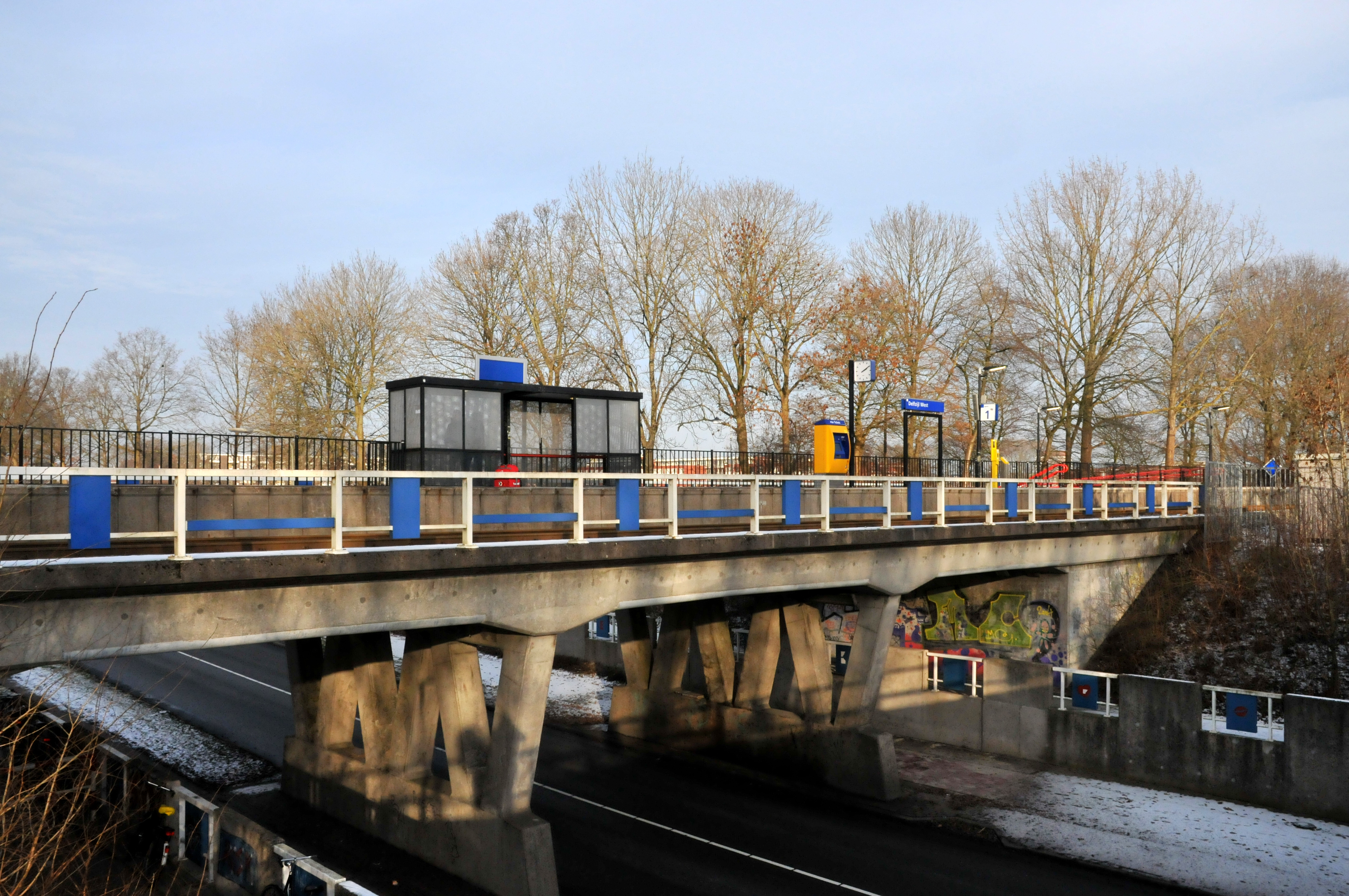
- Delfzijl West railway station in 2011

General information
- Location: Hogelandsterweg 1 Delfzijl, Netherlands
- Coordinates: 53°19′54″N 6°54′24″E
- Line: Groningen–Delfzijl railway

Other information
- Station code: Dzw

History
- Opened: 1 June 1969

Services
Preceding station	Arriva Netherlands	Following station
Appingedam towards Groningen	Stoptrein 37700	Delfzijl Terminus
Location
- Location within Netherlands

Delfzijl West (Dutch pronunciation: [dɛl(ə)fˌsɛil ˈʋɛst]) is a railway station located in Delfzijl, Netherlands. It is located on the Groningen–Delfzijl railway between Appingedam and Delfzijl. The station was opened on 1 June 1969. The train services are operated by Arriva.

== History ==
The Groningen–Delfzijl railway was opened in 1884. Train services at this railway station started on 1 June 1969.

== Services ==
The train services are currently operated by Arriva. The following local service calls at Delfzijl West twice per hour:

- Stoptrein 37700: Groningen – Groningen Noord – Sauwerd – Bedum – Stedum – Loppersum – Appingedam – Delfzijl West – Delfzijl
