= Appingedam railway station =

Railway station in the Netherlands

Appingedam
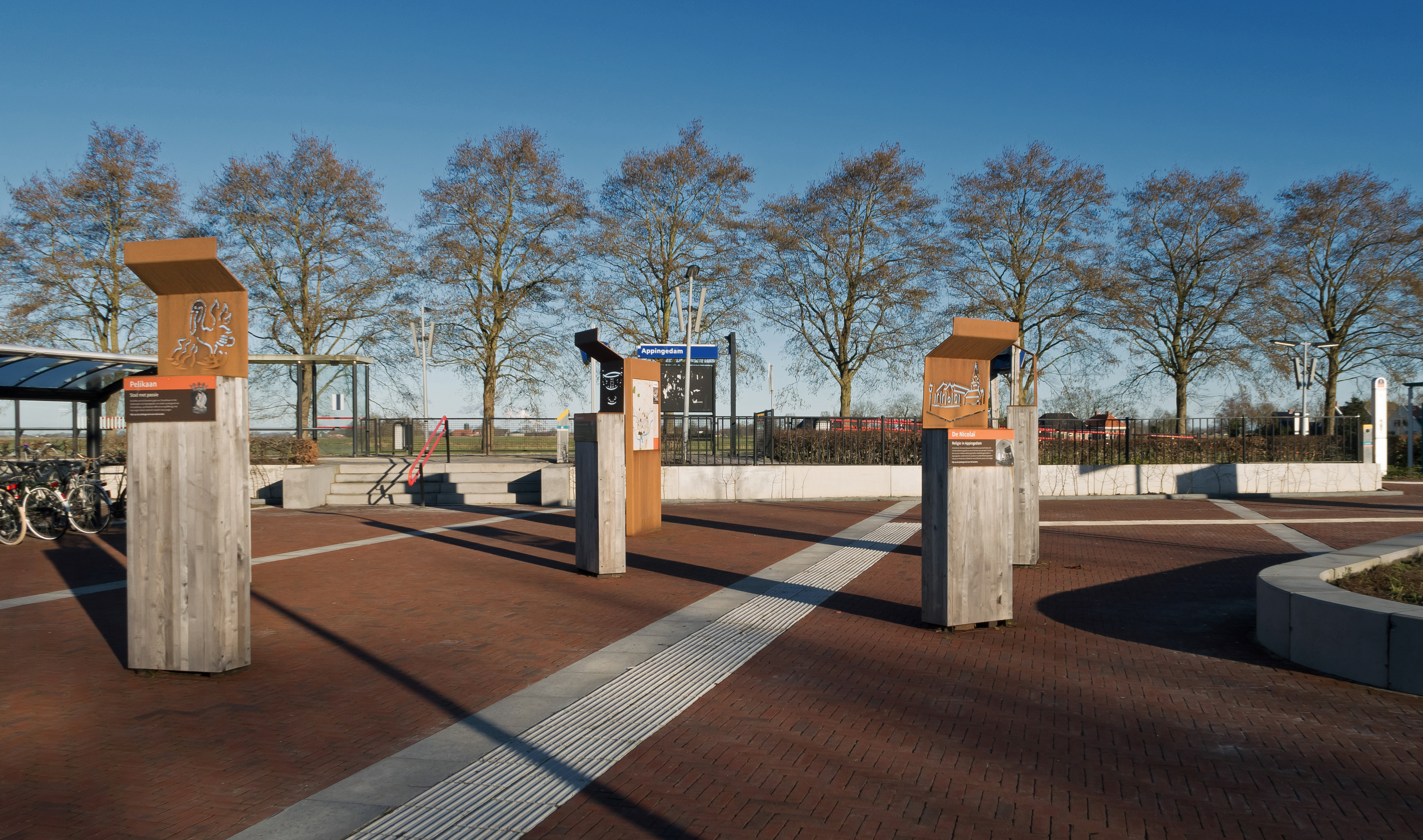
- Appingedam railway station in 2018

General information
- Location: Appingedam, Netherlands
- Coordinates: 53°20′N 6°52′E
- Line: Groningen–Delfzijl railway

Other information
- Station code: Apg

History
- Opened: 15 June 1884

Services
Preceding station	Arriva Netherlands	Following station
Loppersum towards Groningen	Stoptrein 37700	Delfzijl West towards Delfzijl
Location
- Location within Netherlands

Appingedam (Dutch pronunciation: [ˌɑpɪŋəˈdɑm]; abbreviation: Apg) is a railway station in the city of Appingedam, Netherlands. The station was opened on 15 June 1884 and is located on the Groningen–Delfzijl railway. Nowadays the station is unstaffed. Only basic platform facilities, as a shelter and a ticket machine, remain. The station is owned by ProRail and operated by Arriva.

== History ==
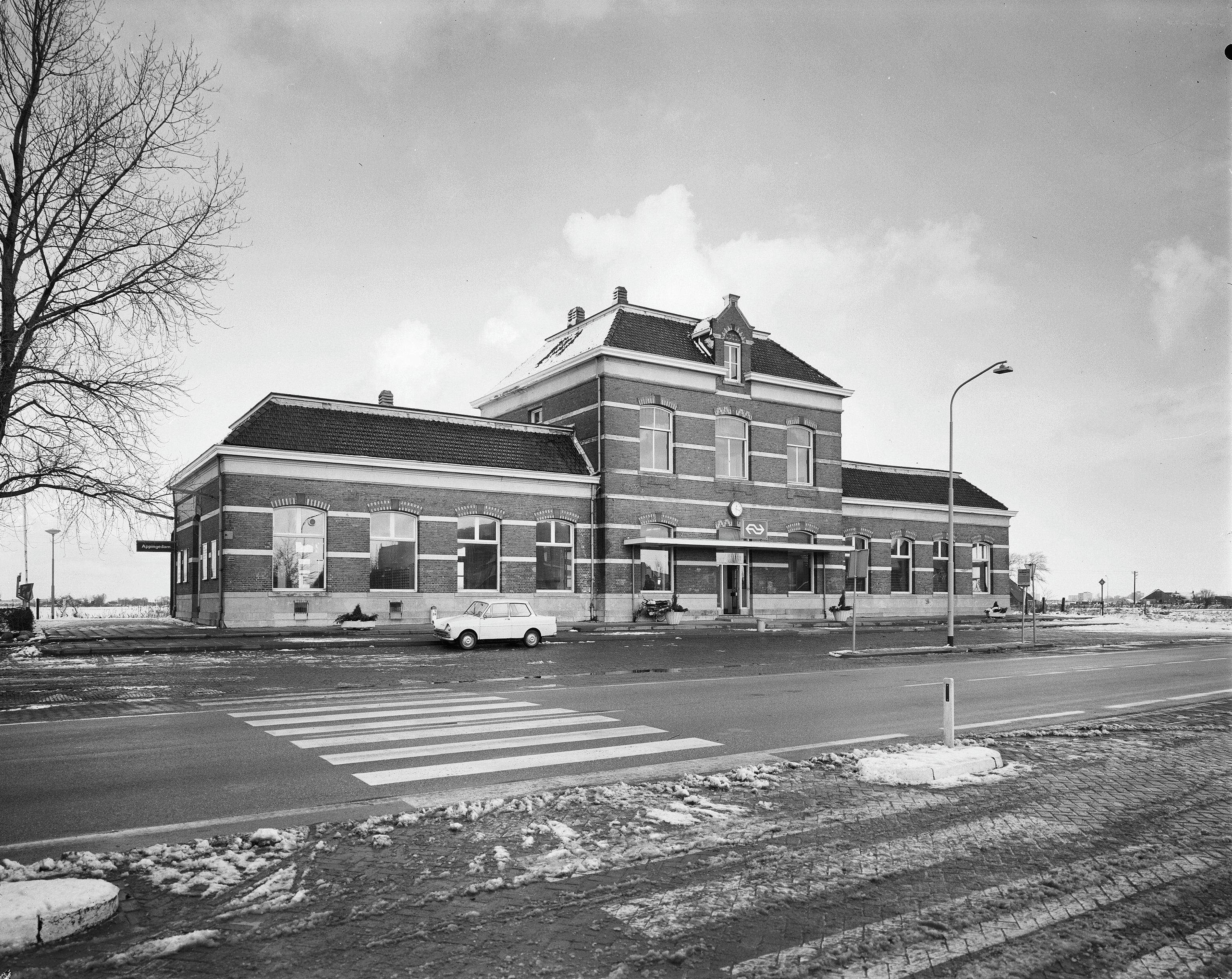
Former station building in 1973

The station building was completed in 1883. Train services started when the Groningen–Delfzijl railway was opened on 15 June 1884.

== Former building ==
The original station building was intended for heritage status, but was demolished after a fire in 1978.

== Services ==
=== Trains ===
The following train services operated by Arriva currently call at Appingedam:

- 2x per hour local service (stoptrein) Groningen – Delfzijl

=== Buses ===
At the station, there are two bus connections operated by Qbuzz with the following destinations:

- 45: Delfzijl – Appingedam – Holwierde – Bierum – Spijk – Losdorp – Godlinze – 't Zandt – Zeerijp – Loppersum (1x per hour)
- 91: Appingedam – Holwierde – Krewerd – Oosterwijtwerd – Leermens – Eenum – Loppersum (5x per day)
- 140: Delfzijl – Appingedam – Ten Boer – Groningen (1x per hour)
