= Stedum =

- Village
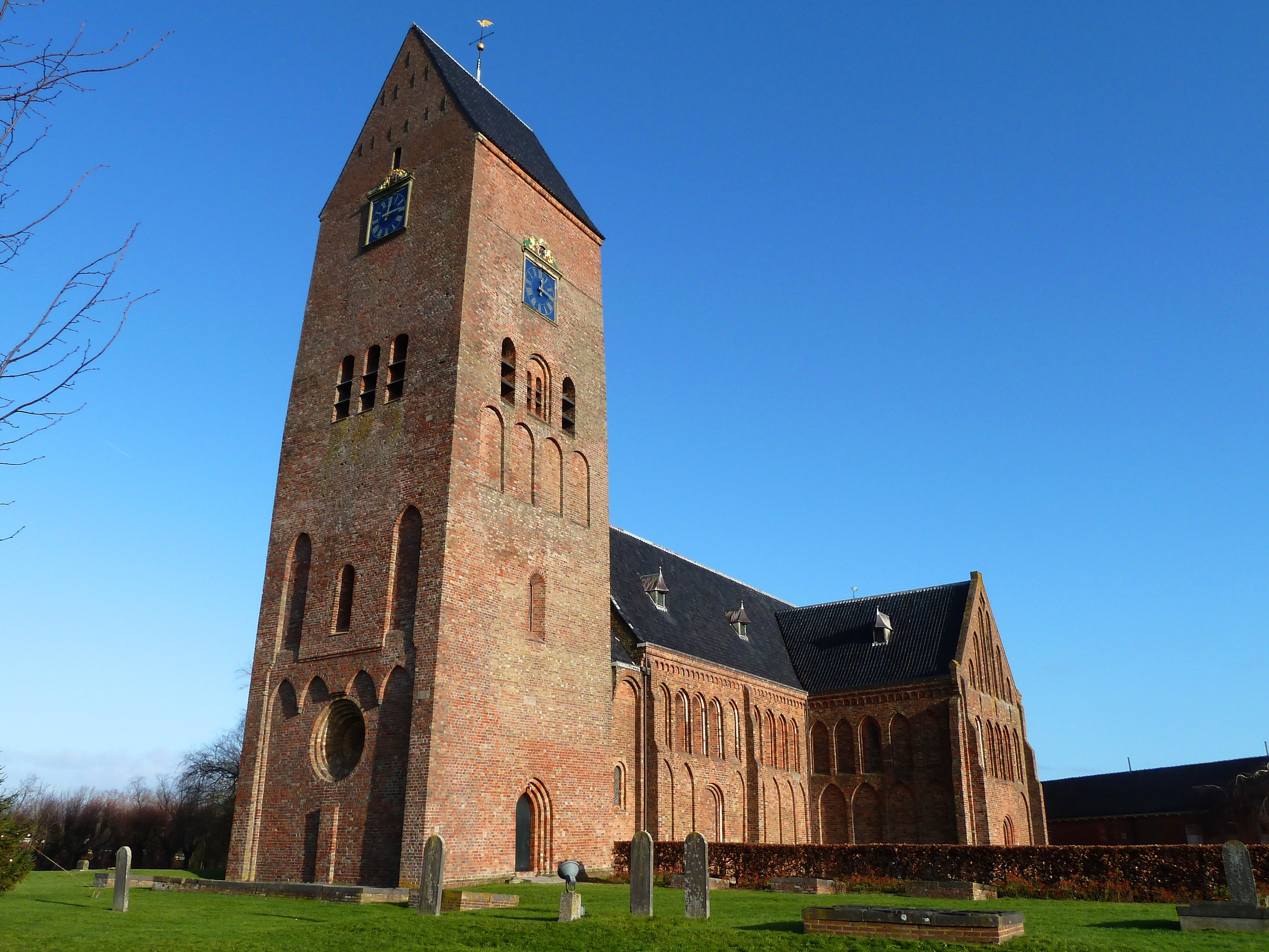
- Bartholomeuskerk in 2011

- Location of Stedum in the province of Groningen Stedum (Netherlands)
- Coordinates: 53°19′21″N 6°41′45″E
- Country: Netherlands
- Province: Groningen
- Municipality: Eemsdelta

Area
  - Total: 24.04 km^{2} (9.28 sq mi)
- Elevation: 0.4 m (1.3 ft)

Population (2021)
  - Total: 1,065
  - Density: 44.30/km^{2} (114.7/sq mi)
- Time zone: UTC+1 (CET)
  - Summer (DST): UTC+2 (CEST)
- Postal code: 9921
- Dialing code: 0596

Stedum (Dutch pronunciation: [ˈsteːdʏm]; Gronings: Steem [ˈsteɪm]) is a village in the Dutch province of Groningen. It is located in the municipality of Eemsdelta, about 15 km (9 mi) northeast of the city of Groningen.

Stedum was a separate municipality until 1990, when it merged with Loppersum.

The German municipality of Hohenhameln, which includes the German village of Stedum, was twinned with the Dutch municipality of Loppersum.

== History ==
The village was first mentioned in the 10th or 11th century as Stedion and means "settlement near the (farmers) place". Stedum is a terp (artificial living village) with an elongated structure which developed during the early Middle Ages. The shape was partially a result of the former river Fivel. The church was built on the west side, and a borg on the northeastern side.

The first church was constructed in the 9th or 10th century. The tower of the current church dates from the 13th century and was enlarged in the 14th century. Around 1400, the church and tower were turned into a single structure. In the 15th and 16th century, the church was enlarged, and restored between 1877 and 1878.

Borg Nittersum was built before 1400. It was destroyed in 1579 by Spanish troops, and Egbert Clant, the owner of the castle, fled to East Frisia. It was rebuilt before 1594 by his son. In 1669, it was demolished and replaced by a manor house; however, it was demolished again in 1818.

Stedum was a heerlijkheid until 1795 and then became a municipality. Stedum was home to 537 people in 1840. In 1884, a railway station opened in Stedum. The town hall was constructed in 1926 in expressionist style and has served as an office building since 1990. In 1990, Stedum ceased to be an independent municipality and merged into Loppersum.

== Gallery ==
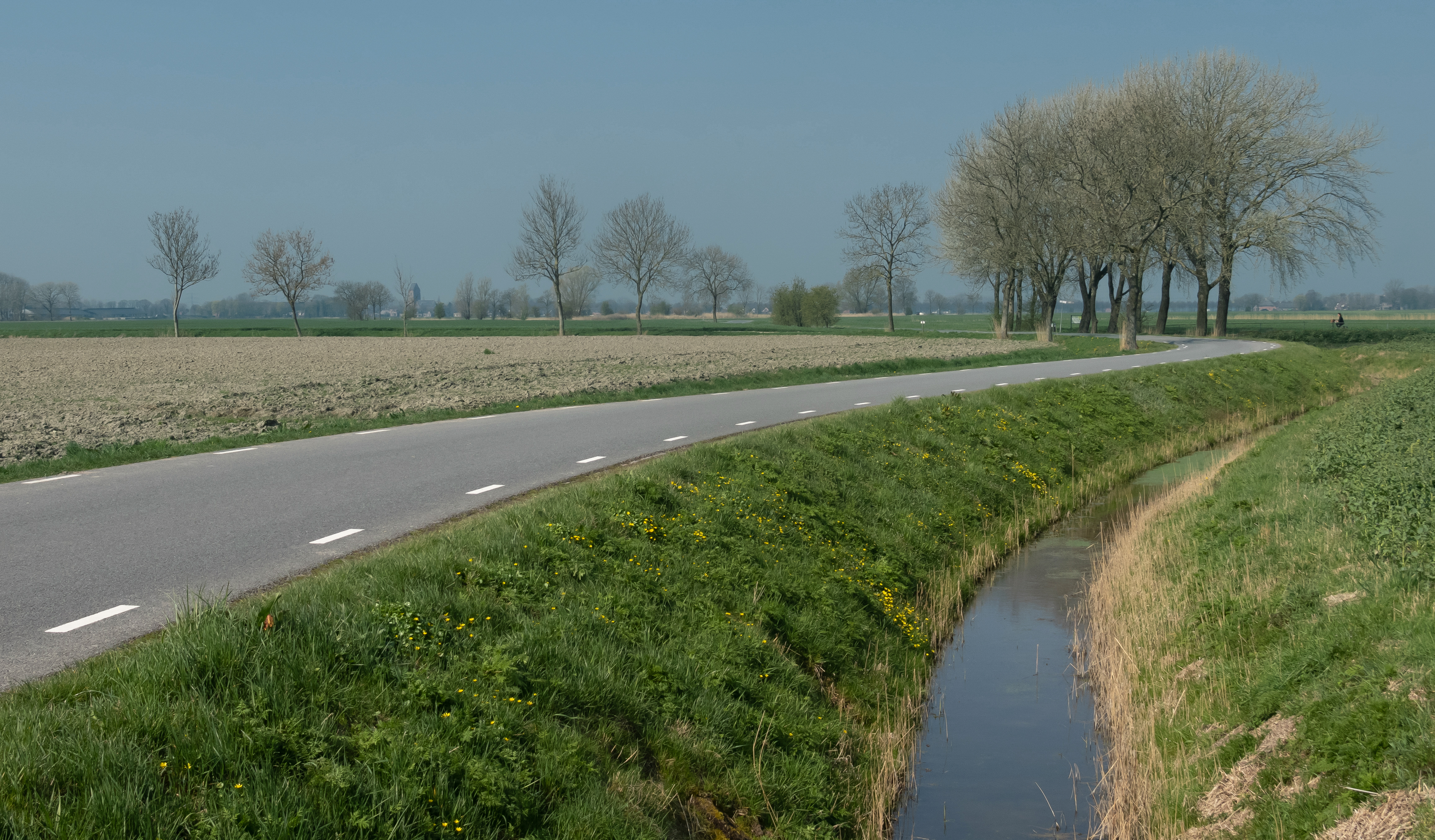
Stedum, road panorama Delleweg

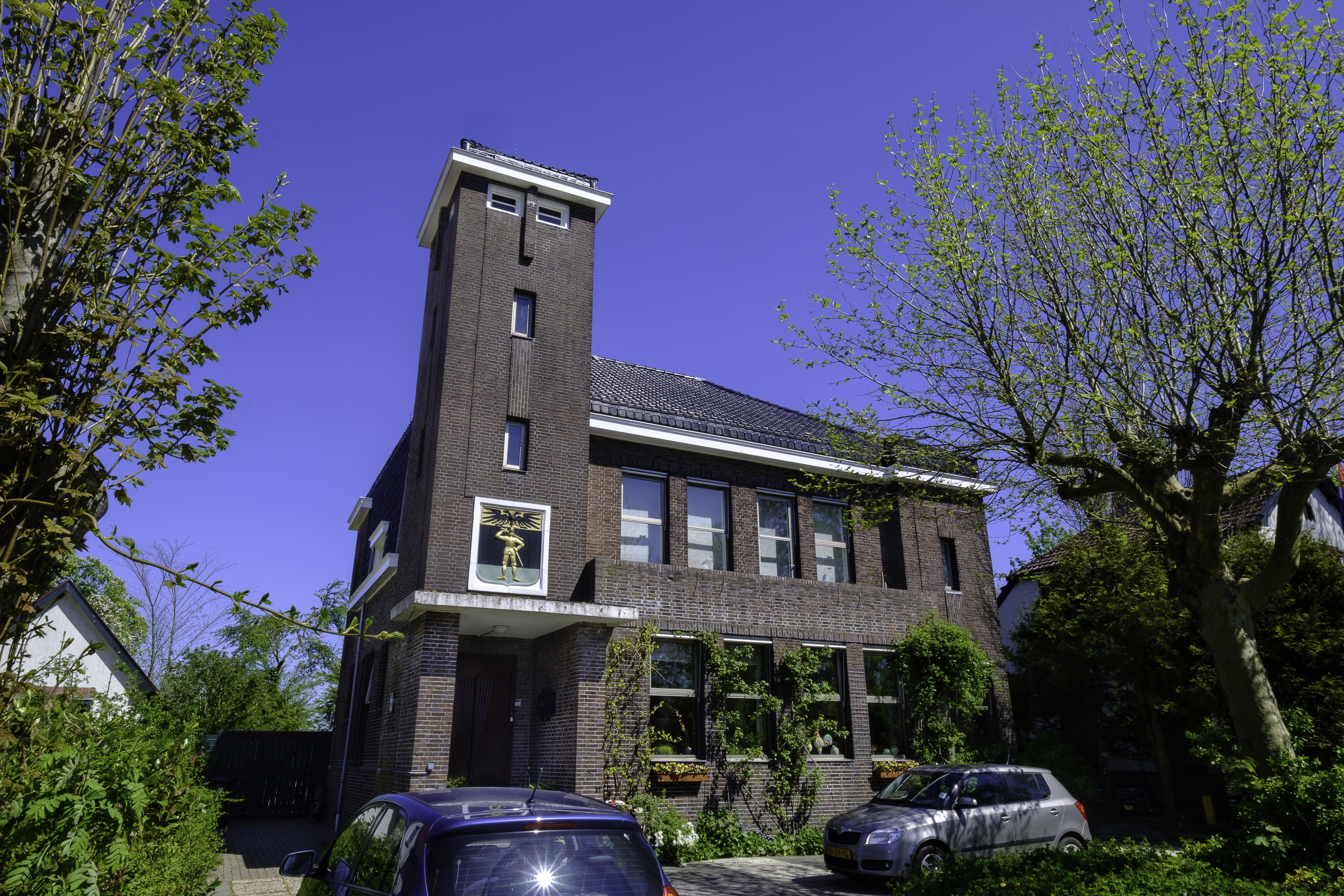
Former town hall

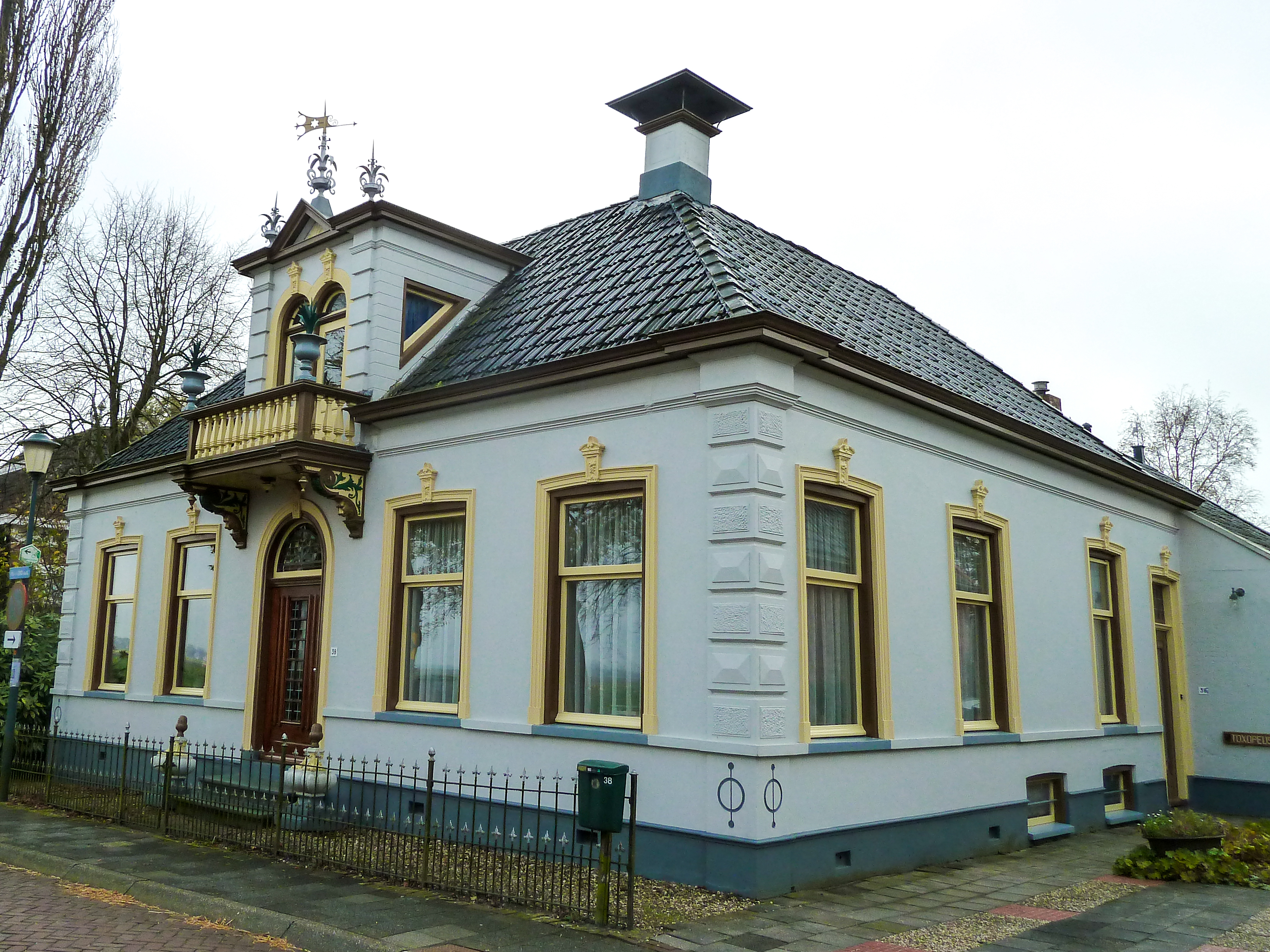
Villa in Stedum

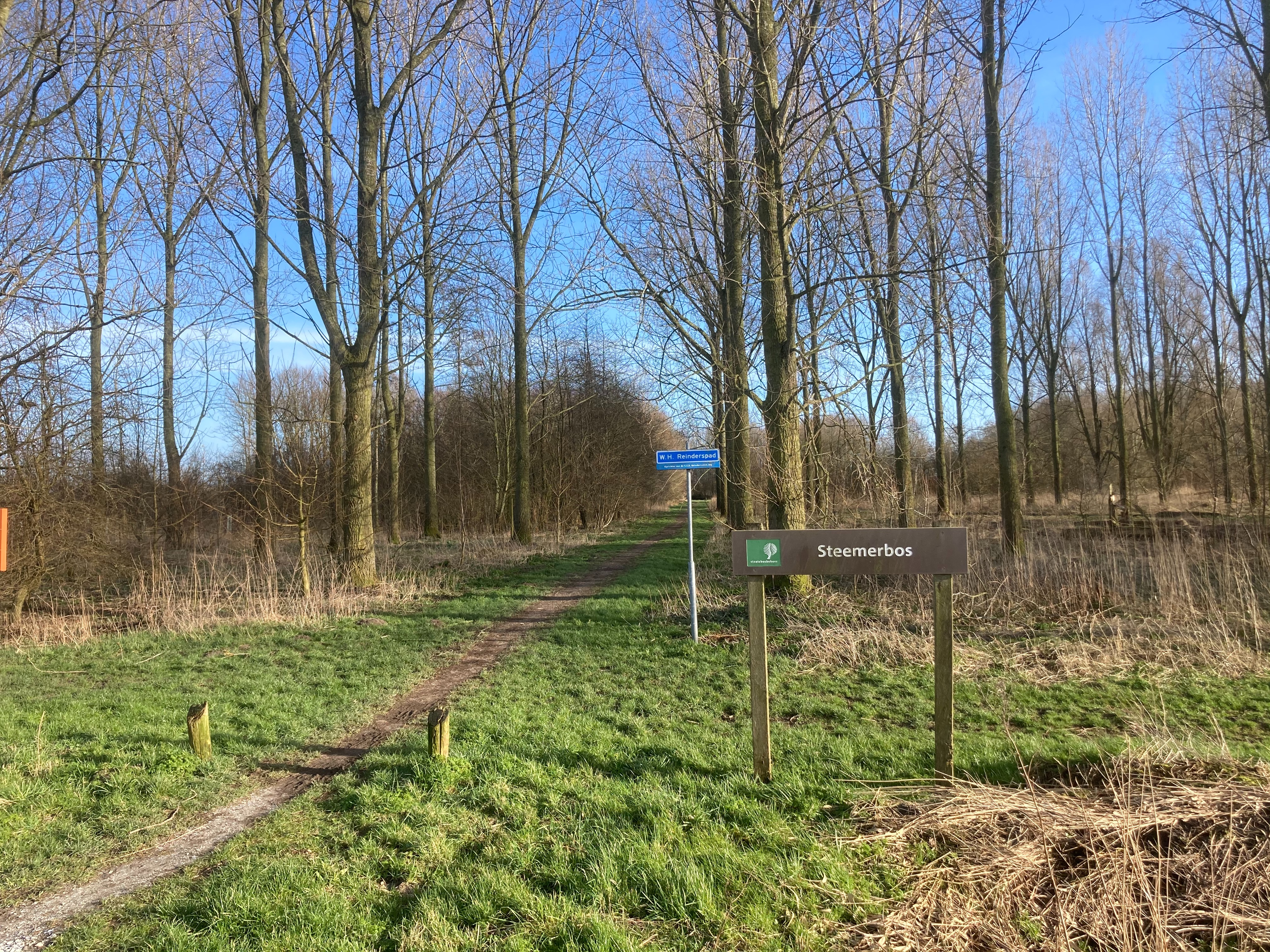
Steemerbos

== See also ==
- Stedum railway station
