= Eyran Katsenelenbogen =

Israeli jazz pianist

Eyran Katsenelenbogen ערן קצנלנבוגן
- Born: July 5, 1965 (age 61)
- Genres: Jazz
- Instrument: Piano

Eyran Katsenelenbogen (Hebrew: ערן קצנלנבוגן; born July 5, 1965) is an American jazz pianist.

== Background ==
Katsenelenbogen was born in 1965 and was first taught by Aida Barenboim, mother and teacher of pianist/conductor Daniel Barenboim. He went on to complete his music education at the New England Conservatory of Music in Boston, where he trained with Ran Blake, Paul Bley, Fred Hersch, Danilo Pérez, George Russell and Gunther Schuller.

Eyran Katsenelenbogen is a descendant of Rabbi Meir Katzenellenbogen (c. 1482 – 12 January 1565) who was born in Katzenelnbogen. On July 28, 2012, Eyran Katsenelenbogen performed a concert at the town hall of Katzenelnbogen, by invitation of the Mayor of Katzenelnbogen, Horst Klöppel, in celebration of the town’s 700th anniversary.

== Career ==
A classically trained pianist with a jazz style, Katsenelenbogen has performed throughout the world. Venues have included the Iridium Jazz Club, New York; Teatro di Marcello, Rome; the Tel-Aviv Jazz & Blues Festival; the Bechstein Centrum, Hamburg; Mirrors Hall, Saint Petersburg; Scullers Jazz Club, Boston; Shalin Liu Performance Center, Rockport, MA; Saint Joseph Theatre, Scarborough, UK; and the Glenn Gould Studio, Toronto. Radio and TV appearances include WGBH (FM), WERS and WHRB, USA; BBC Radio York, UK; Israel Broadcasting Authority (IBA), and Radio Télévision Belge Francophone (RTBF), Belgium.

Katsenelenbogen's recordings have been reviewed by jazz publications such as Jazziz, JazzTimes, Jazz Journal International and All About Jazz, which stated in its review of Katsenelenbogen's previous release: "88 Fingers is truly a virtuoso's work. Perhaps Katsenelenbogen is most in league with Art Tatum for this fact: he sets the bar towards which other pianists must strive."

Since 1996, Katsenelenbogen has held a faculty position at the New England Conservatory of Music (NEC) Preparatory School and School of Continuing Education in Boston. At NEC, he has pioneered innovative techniques for teaching improvisation to students with special abilities and diverse needs. As the first piano teacher of jazz prodigy Matt Savage, Katsenelenbogen helped kick off Savage's recording career at the age of seven with their CD One is Not Fun, but 20 is Plenty.

In addition to solo touring, Katsenelenbogen has also performed with his Pictures At An Exhibition: Classical Meets Jazz collaboration with Russian classical pianist Andrei Ivanovitch. Following performances in Germany and Russia, the American premiere of Pictures At An Exhibition: Classical Meets Jazz took place at Jordan Hall in Boston on May 24, 2009, and was released on DVD the following year.

In 2014, Katsenelenbogen has toured the east coast of China with pianist Tal Zilber. During their Piano Fight concert tour, Katsenelenbogen and Zilber performed at the Dalian International Conference Center, the Hai Tian Grand Theatre Hotel, the Weifang Culture and Art Center, the Taiyuan Poly Great Theatre, the Henan Art Center in Zhongzhou, the Wuhan Qin Tai Grand Theatre, the Xuzhou Concert Hall and the Hong Tai Center in Xiamen. In 2015, Katsenelenbogen returned to China alone for a tour titled Jazz and Classical Highlights China Solo Tour dedicated to his mother, Pnina Katsenelenbogen. During that tour, Katsenelenbogen performed fifteen concerts in various venues, including the Cathay Pacific Arts Center Concert Hall (November 20, 2015), the Wuhu Grand Theatre (November 28, 2015) and the Guangzhou Opera House (December 5, 2015).

In 2019 he released a solo album, titled Outstandards, with a concert tour that included venues in the U.S., Europe and the Middle East.

Since 2020 Katsenelenbogen is a member of the Recording Academy.

== Discography ==
- 1989: Ways Jazz Ensemble (CD) (CDI)
- 1989: Jazzonettes (CD) (Jazzis)
- 1992: One-Time (CD) (Jazzis)
- 1996: The Bareback Trio (CD) (Eyran Records)
- 1998: Solo Piano (CD) (Eyran Records)
- 1999: Clouds (CD) (Eyran Records)
- 2000: One is Not Fun, but 20 is Plenty (CD) (with Matthew Savage) (Savage Records)
- 2001: Formation (CD) (Eyran Records)
- 2001: Oasis Jazz Instrumentals (CD) (Oasis)
- 2003: It's Reigning Kats & Dogs & Bogen (CD) (Eyran Records)
- 2005: Solotude (DVD) (Eyran Records)
- 2005: Just For Fun (CD) (with Ellie Malick) (Eyran Records)
- 2005: Solotude (CD) (Eyran Records)
- 2006: The Key Players Vol. 6 (CD) (Jazziz)
- 2007: Somthin' N'you – The Single (Digital Single) (Eyran Records)
- 2009: 88 Fingers (CD) (Eyran Records)
- 2011: Classical Meets Jazz: Pictures at an Exhibition (DVD) (with Andrei Ivanovitch) (Eyran Records)
- 2011: Black Ivory (CD) (With Ellie Malick) (Eyran Records)
- 2012: Nutcracker Swing – Live in Jordan Hall (Digital Single) (Eyran Records)
- 2012: Nutcracker Blues – Live in Jordan Hall (Digital Single) (Eyran Records)
- 2012: Swan Lake – Live in Jordan Hall (Digital Single) (Eyran Records)
- 2012: Nutcracker Sombrero – Live in Jordan Hall (Digital Single) (Eyran Records)
- 2012: Christmas Blues (Digital Single) (with Gitit Shoval and Vincere Sylph) (Eyran Records)
- 2013: Prélude À L'après-midi d'un faune – Live (Digital Single) (Eyran Records)
- 2013: Rêverie – Improvisation On Debussy (Digital Single) (Eyran Records)
- 2013: Prélude – Improvisation in the Style of Debussy – Live in Jordan Hall (Digital Single) (Eyran Records)
- 2013: Arabesque No. 1 – Live in Jordan Hall (Digital Single) (Eyran Records)
- 2013: I Love a Piano – Live (Digital Single) (Digital Single) (Eyran Records)
- 2013: When I Fall in Love (Live) (Digital Single) (Eyran Records)
- 2019: Outstandards (CD) (Eyran Records)
