= Andrei Ivanovitch =

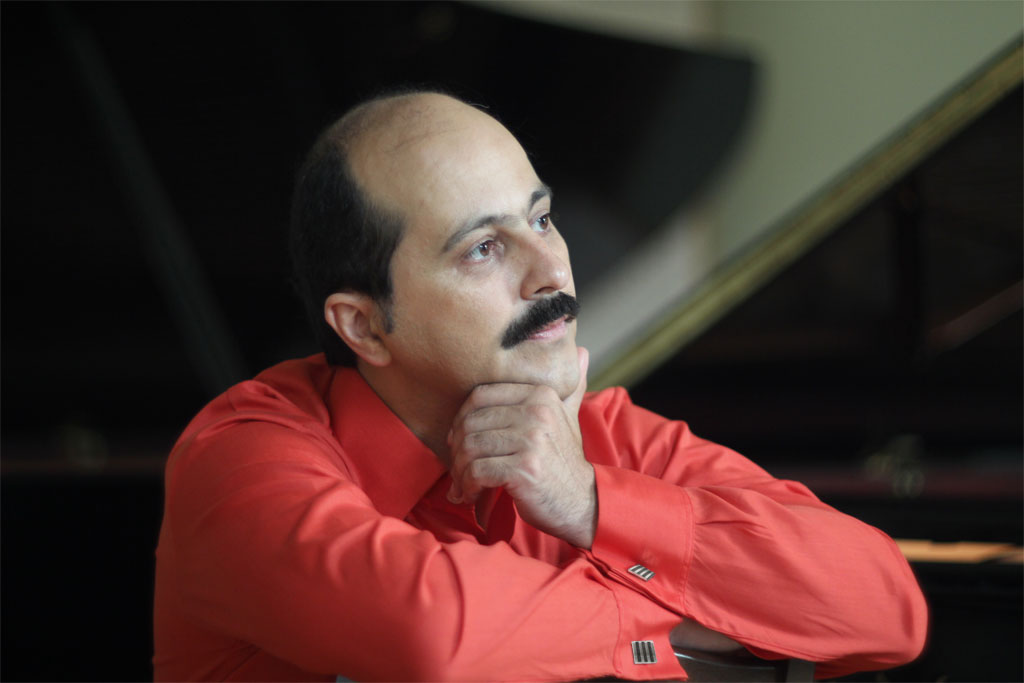
- Portrait Andrei Ivanovitch

Background information
- Born: 1968 (age 57–58); Bucharest, Romania
- Genre: Classical
- Instrument: Piano
- Website: http://ivanovitch.ru/

Andrei Ivanovitch (Russian: Андрей Викторович Иванович, romanized: Andrey Viktorovich Ivanovich; born 1968) is a Romanian-born Russian classical pianist and winner of a number of international competitions.

== Biography and career ==
Andrei Ivanovitch, great-grandson of the Romanian composer Ion Ivanovici (The Waves of the Danube), studied at the Central Music School, at the Leningrad Conservatory, at the Music Academy in Moscow and at the Musical College in Karlsruhe. He won several prizes in international competitions, amongst others he won the gold medal at the World Piano Competition in Cincinnati, Ohio, U.S. The specialised press compares him to Dinu Lipatti and Arturo Benedetti Michelangeli. Since 2003, he is honorary member of the Chopin Society. His numerous concerts in Europe earned him the reputation of being one of the great Interpreters of Russian piano music. During his Germany tours he always gave guest performances at Hummer's Culture Parlour in Soßmar (whose owner, Gerhard Hummer, he's been friends with for several years), which made him a great following in this region. During his tour in 2007, he met the jazz pianist Eyran Katsenelenbogen in the Hummer's Culture Parlour in Soßmar, in order to create a new kind of piano concert.

== Press ==
- Kulturring Peine
- Hummer's Culture Parlour, October 5th, 2007 (english)
- Michael Schröder (October 6, 2007). "Pianisten verschmelzen die Welt der Musik". Peiner Allgemeine Zeitung (in German). Archived from the original on Jan 16, 2009.
- Peiner Allgemeine Zeitung, October 8th, 2007 (german)
- Peiner Allgemeine Zeitung, October 14th, 2007 (german)
- Calenberger Cultour & Co.
- Any comments by the international press

== Discography ==
- 1999: various artists Best of Mozart CD (1 of 8 tracks)
- 1999: various artists Best of Chopin - Grande Valse Brilliante, Barcarole, etc. CD (8 of 11 tracks)
- 2000: Ivanovitch & De Luca Chopin: Piano Concertos
- 2001: various artists Monet Collection - Romantic Moments CD (1 of 29 tracks)
- 2002: various artists 50 Classical Performances - Romantic Piano CD (24 of 50 tracks)
