= Equord =

Equord may refer to:

- Equord (Hohenhameln), a village in the municipality of Hohenhameln, Lower Saxony, Germany
- Kurt von Hammerstein-Equord (1878–1943), German general
