= Stedum railway station =

Railway station in the Netherlands

Stedum
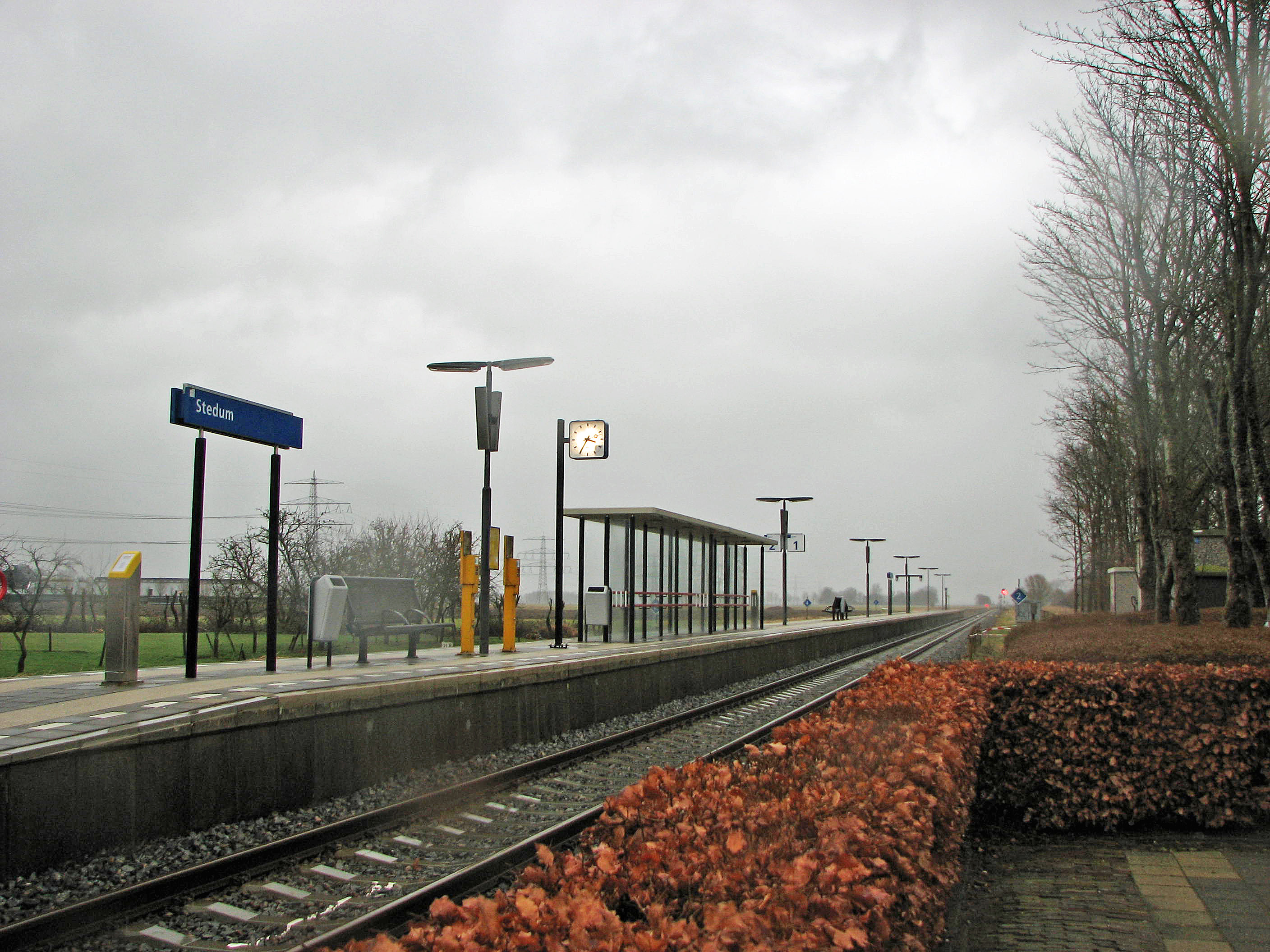

General information
- Location: Netherlands
- Coordinates: 53°19′34″N 6°41′15″E
- Line: Groningen–Delfzijl railway

History
- Opened: 15 June 1884

Services
Preceding station	Arriva Netherlands	Following station
Bedum towards Groningen	Stoptrein 37700	Loppersum towards Delfzijl
Location
- Location within Netherlands

Stedum is a railway station located in Stedum, The Netherlands. The station was opened on 15 June 1884 and is located on the Groningen–Delfzijl railway. The train services are operated by Arriva.

== Train service ==
The following services currently call at Stedum:

- 2x per hour local service (stoptrein) Groningen - Delfzijl
