= Delfzijl railway station =

Railway station in Delfzijl, Netherlands

Delfzijl
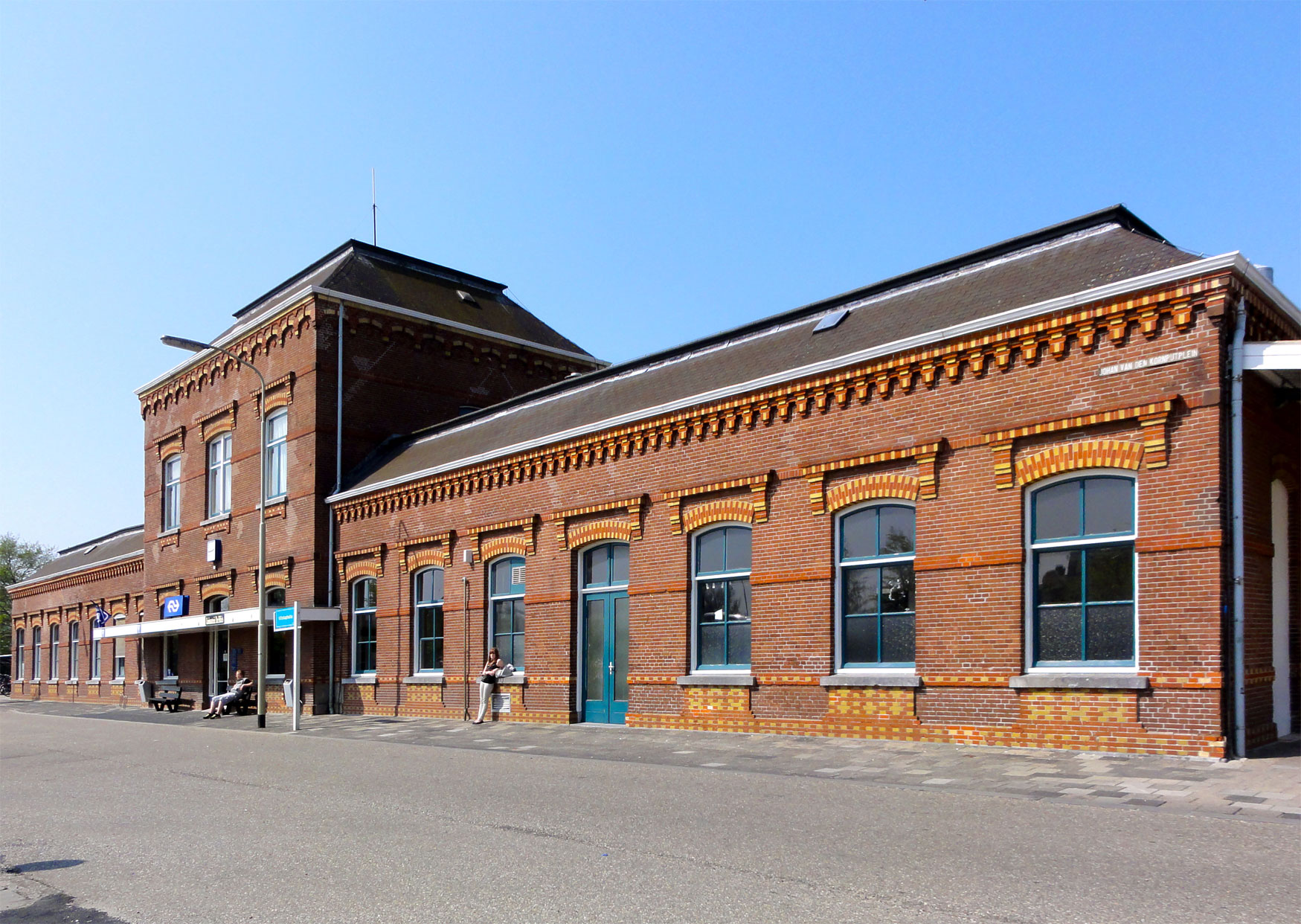
- Delfzijl railway station in 2011

General information
- Location: Johan van den Kornputplein 1 Delfzijl, Netherlands
- Coordinates: 53°20′00″N 6°55′24″E
- Operator: NS Stations
- Line: Groningen–Delfzijl railway
- Train operators: Arriva
- Bus operators: Qbuzz
- Connections: Bus lines 43, 61, 119, 140, 245, 566, 619

Other information
- Station code: Dz

History
- Opened: 15 June 1884

Services
Preceding station	Arriva Netherlands	Following station
Delfzijl West towards Groningen	Stoptrein 37700	Terminus
Location
- Location within Netherlands

Delfzijl (Dutch pronunciation: [dɛl(ə)fˈsɛil]; abbreviation: Dz) is a railway station in Delfzijl, Netherlands. It is located on the Groningen–Delfzijl railway after Delfzijl West as the terminus for passengers. The railway line continues further east, but only for freight trains. The station building was completed in 1883 and train services started on 15 June 1884. The trains are currently operated by Arriva.

== Location ==
The railway station is located at the Johan van den Kornputplein in the city of Delfzijl in the northeast of the province of Groningen in the northeast of the Netherlands. The station is the northeastern terminus for passengers of the Groningen–Delfzijl railway after the railway station Delfzijl West. The railway continues further east, but only for freight trains.

The railway connects via Groningen to the rest of the Dutch railway network.

== History ==
The station building was completed in 1883.

The Groningen–Delfzijl railway was opened on 15 June 1884. Train services have been provided by Maatschappij tot Exploitatie van Staatsspoorwegen (1884–1937), Nederlandse Spoorwegen (1938–2000), and NoordNed (2000–2005). Since 2005, the trains have been operated by Arriva, a subsidiary of Deutsche Bahn.

== Building ==
The 19th-century station building is owned by NS Stations. It is of the type Sneek. Five buildings of this type have been built between 1881 and 1883, three of which remain today. The building in Delfzijl was built in 1883.

The building has been a rijksmonument (national heritage site) since 1989.

== Services ==
=== Trains ===
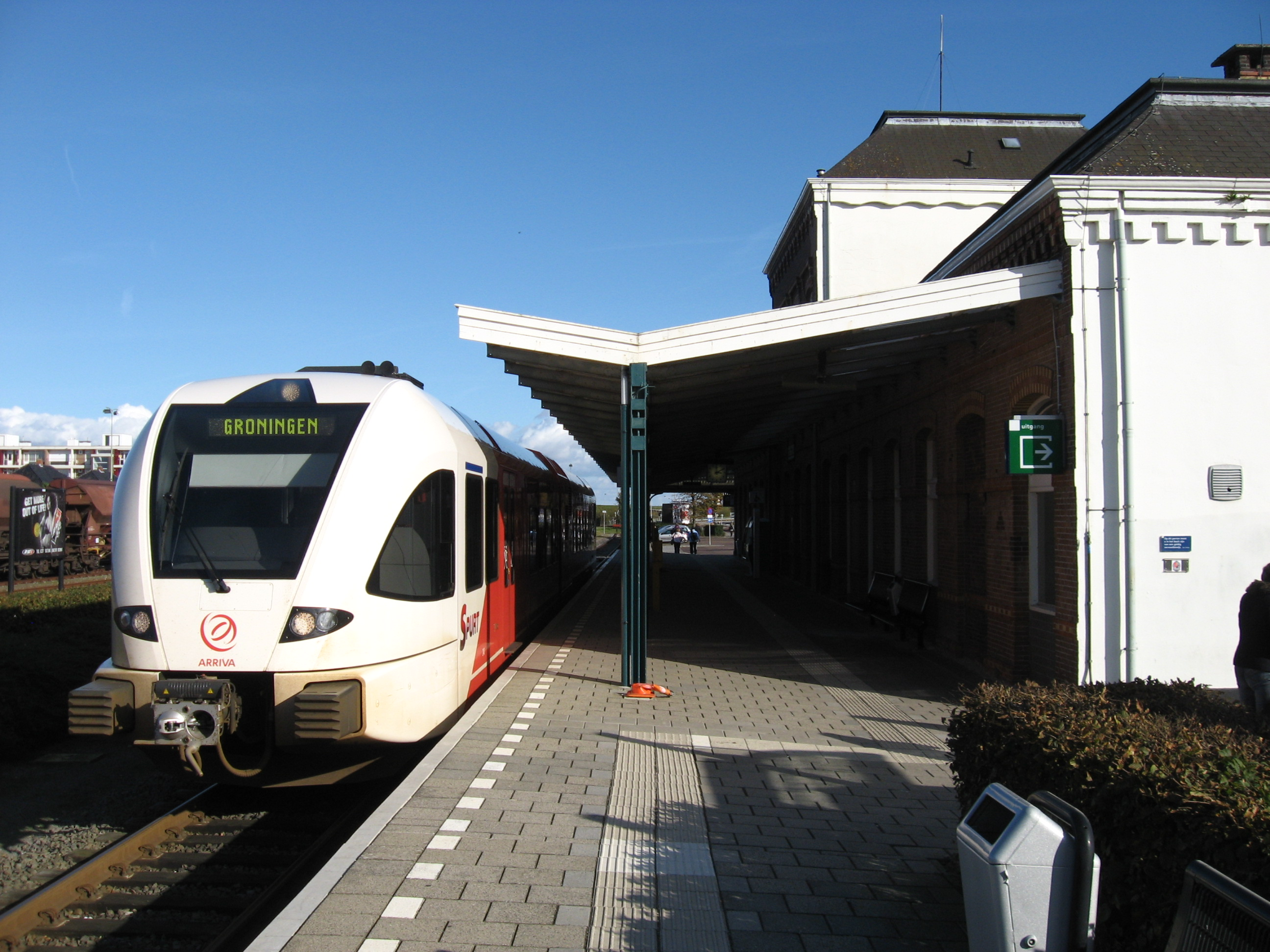
Arriva Spurt at the station in 2009

The train services are currently operated by Arriva. The following local service calls at Delfzijl twice per hour:

- Stoptrein 37700: Groningen – Groningen Noord – Sauwerd – Bedum – Stedum – Loppersum – Appingedam – Delfzijl West – Delfzijl

=== Buses ===
The bus services are currently operated by Qbuzz. There are seven regional bus connections at the station in Delfzijl with the following destinations:

- 43: Siddeburen
- 61: Uithuizen
- 119: Winschoten
- 140: Groningen HS
- 245: Delfzijl (local service in two directions)
- 566: Appingedam Busstation
- 619: Woldendorp Dollard College
- 619: Appingedam
