= Soßmar =

Coordinates: 52°14′31″N 10°03′32″E

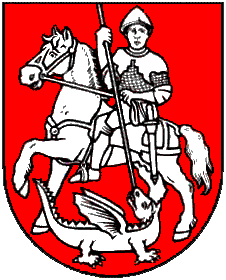
Ortswappen

Soßmar is a village in Lower Saxony, about 30 km south of Hanover, 13 km east of Hildesheim and 12 km west of Peine, a few minutes from the national highways B494 and B65. The motorway A2 via Peine, Hämelerwald, Lehrte or Sehnde/Ilsede/Hanover can be reached in about 20 minutes and the motorway A7 via Sehnde/Ilsede/Hanover or Hildesheim/Drispenstedt in the same time.

== Neighbouring places ==
Hohenhameln, Clauen, Bierbergen, Bründeln, Neu Oedelum, Rautenberg

== Places that belong to the Hohenhameln Community ==
Hohenhameln, Soßmar, Clauen, Bierbergen, Bründeln, Harber, Mehrum, Ohlum, Rötzum, Stedum

== History ==
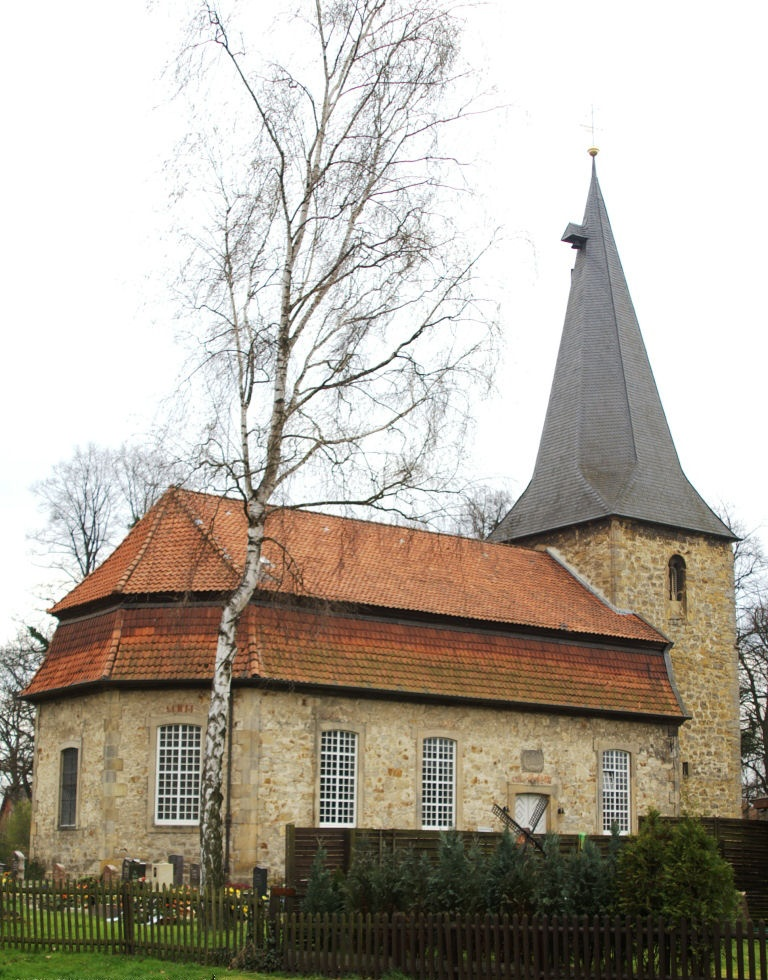
The St.-Georgs-Kirche of Soßmar

Sossmar is possibly over 1,000 years old. There are references that the monastery acquired Corvey with Hoexter at the Weser between the years 826 and 853 possession at a settlement with the name Sursia. The only following name forms are occupied: 1146 Sutherem, 1243 Sutterum inxta Hamelen, in 14th century then Sozerum, Sothzerum and Zocerem. Soßmar was first mentioned in a document dating from the 11 March 1146 granting the monastery 8 morgen of farmland.

== Religion ==
Since 1542 the church community is Evangelical-Lutheran.

== Management ratios ==
777 inhabitants compared to 9,461 inhabitants in the whole community.

== Coat of arms ==
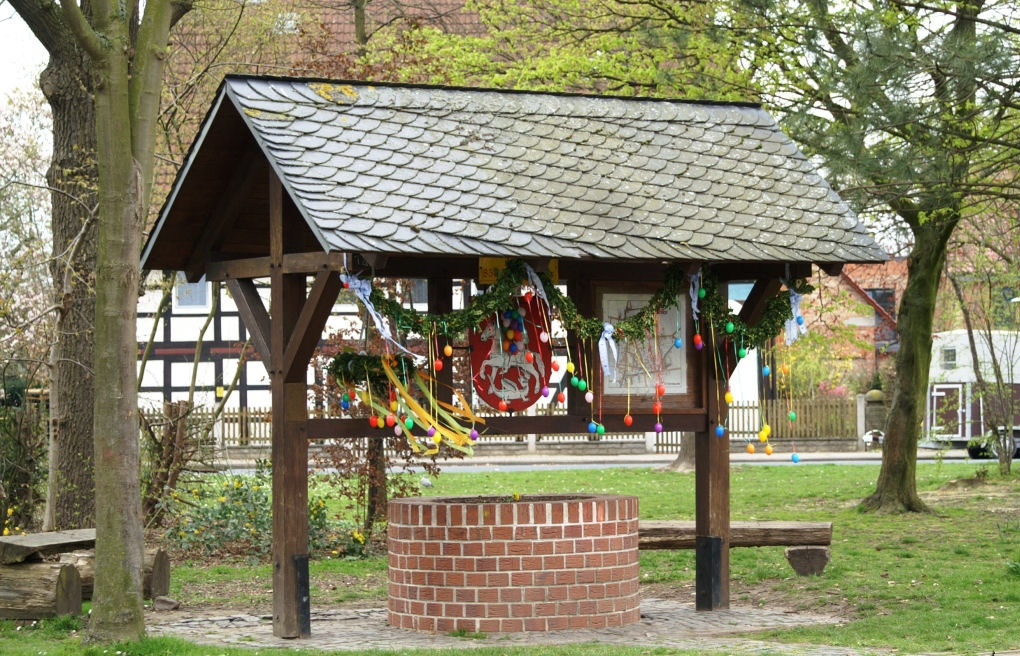
The well on Brinkgarten, the place of the coat of arms

Soßmar's coat of arms shows Saint George and his fight with the dragon.

According to the legend, a dragon made its nest at the spring that provided water for the city of Cyrene in Libya or the city of Lydda, depending on the source. Consequently, the citizens had to dislodge the dragon from its nest for a time, in order to collect water. To do so, each day they offered the dragon a human sacrifice. The victim was chosen by drawing lots. One day, this happened to be the princess. The monarch begged for her life with no result. She was offered to the dragon, but there appeared the saint on his travels. He faced the dragon, slayed it and rescued the princess. The grateful citizens abandoned their ancestral paganism and converted to Christianity.

Patronage and remembrance In 1969, Saint George's feast day was reduced to an optional memorial in the Roman Catholic calendar; the solemnity of his commemoration depends on purely local observance. He is, however, still honoured as a saint of major importance by the Eastern Orthodox Church and in Oriental Orthodoxy.
