= Bedum railway station =

Railway station in the Netherlands

Bedum
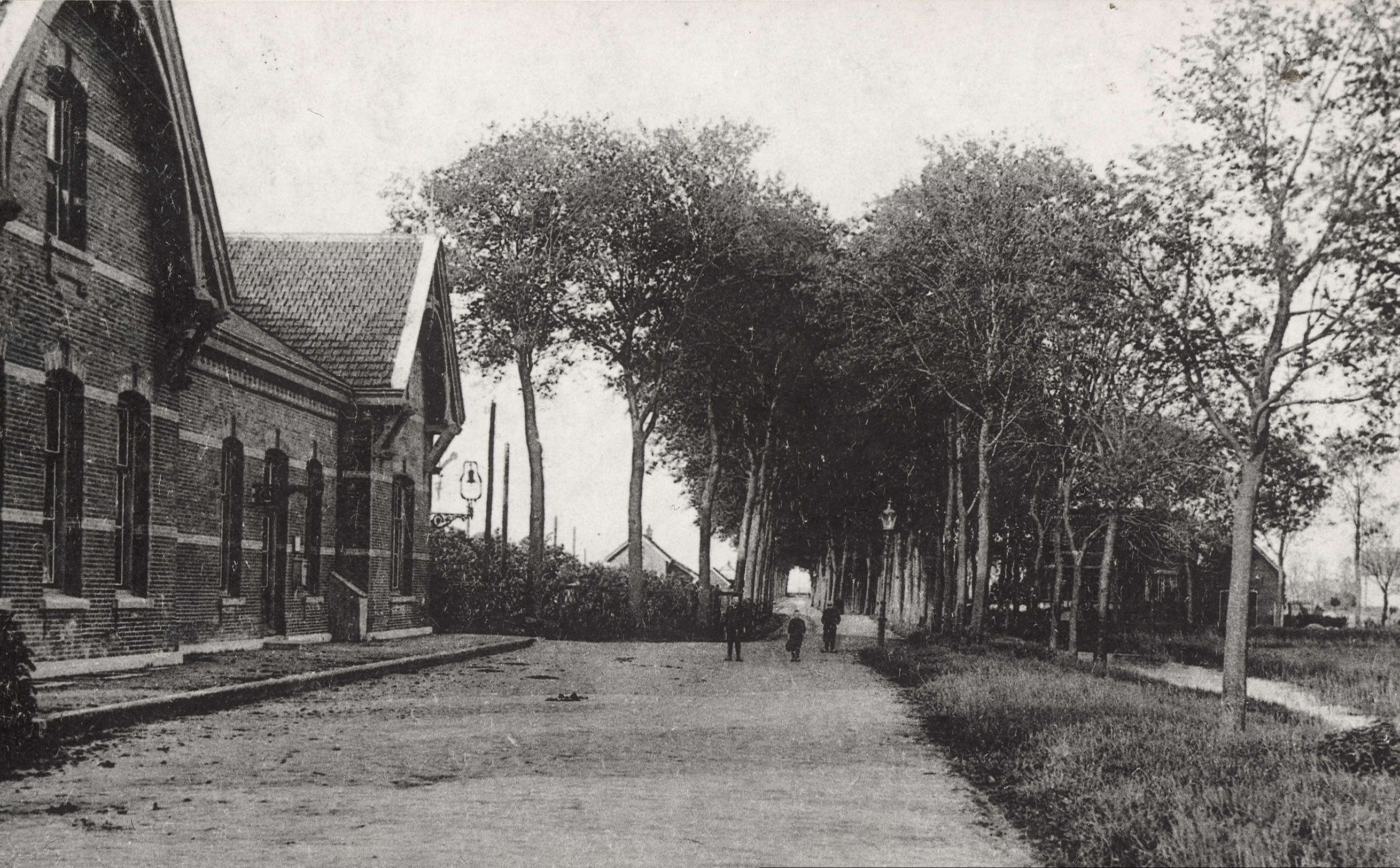
- Bedum railway station in 1920

General information
- Location: Netherlands
- Coordinates: 53°18′24″N 6°35′32″E
- Line: Groningen–Delfzijl railway

History
- Opened: 15 June 1884

Services
| Preceding station | Arriva Netherlands | Following station |
|---|---|---|
| Sauwerd towards Groningen | Stoptrein 37700 | Stedum towards Delfzijl |
Location
- Location within Netherlands

Bedum is a railway station located in Bedum, Netherlands. The station was opened on 15 June 1884 and is located on the Groningen–Delfzijl railway. The services are currently operated by Arriva.

== Train service ==
The following services currently call at Bedum:

- 2x per hour local service (stoptrein) Groningen - Delfzijl
