= Loppersum railway station =

Railway station in the Netherlands

Loppersum
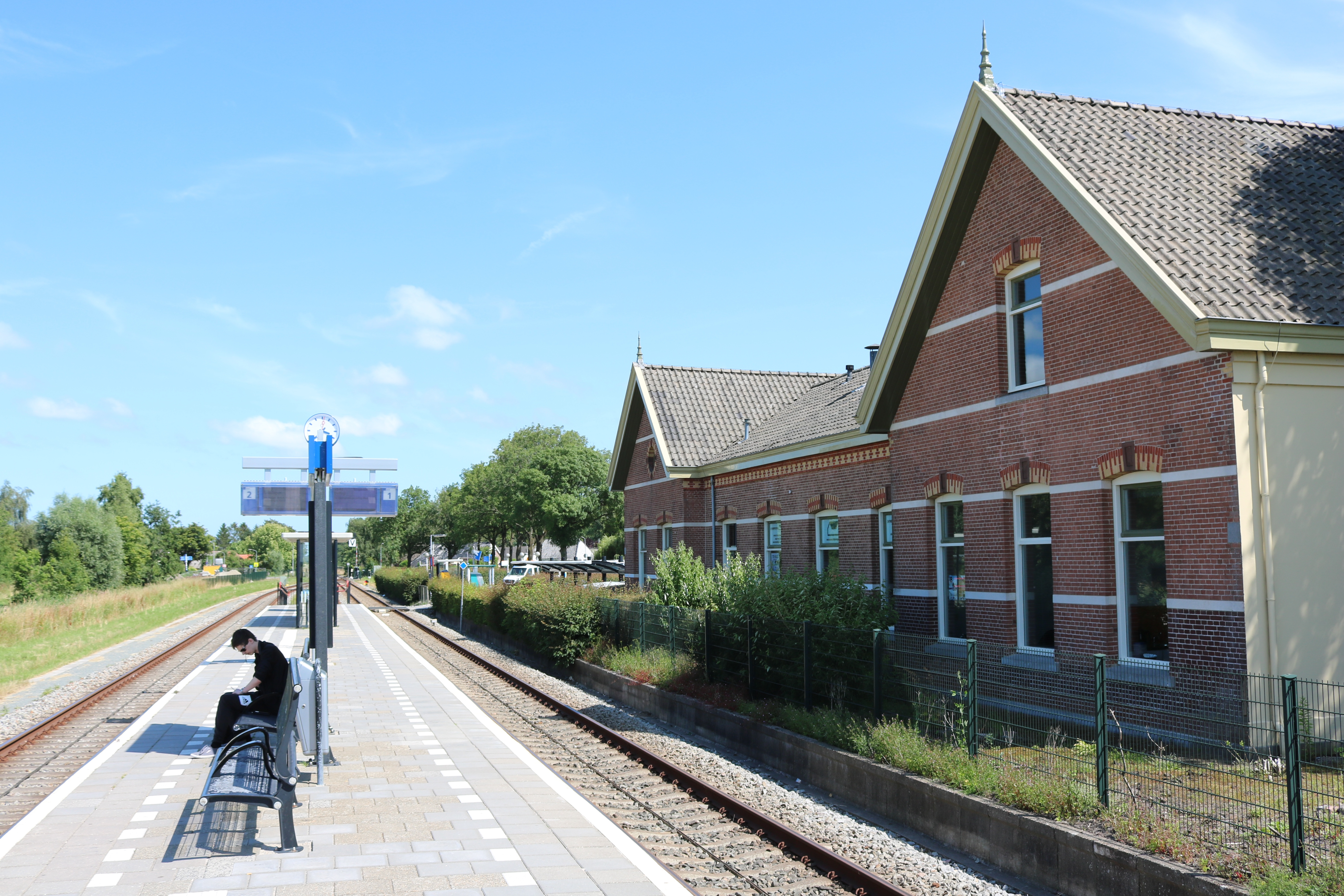
- Loppersum station in 2018

General information
- Location: Netherlands
- Coordinates: 53°20′04″N 6°44′49″E
- Line: Groningen–Delfzijl railway

History
- Opened: 15 June 1884

Services
Preceding station	Arriva Netherlands	Following station
Stedum towards Groningen	Stoptrein 37700	Appingedam towards Delfzijl
Location
- Location within Netherlands

Loppersum is a railway station located in Loppersum, the Netherlands. The station was opened on 15 June 1884 and is located on the Groningen–Delfzijl railway. The service is operated by Arriva.

== Train service ==
The following services currently call at Loppersum:

- 2x per hour local service (stoptrein) Groningen - Delfzijl
