= Sauwerd railway station =

Railway station in the Netherlands

Sauwerd
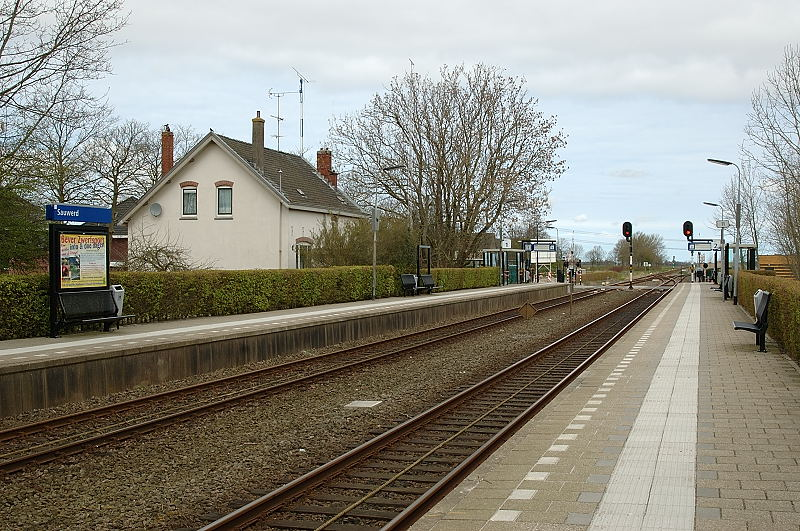

General information
- Location: Netherlands
- Coordinates: 53°17′29″N 6°32′24″E
- Lines: Groningen–Delfzijl railway Sauwerd–Roodeschool railway

History
- Opened: 15 June 1884

Services
Preceding station	Arriva Netherlands	Following station
Groningen Noord towards Groningen	Stoptrein 37600	Winsum towards Eemshaven
Groningen Noord towards Groningen	Stoptrein 37700	Bedum towards Delfzijl
Location
- Location within Netherlands

Sauwerd is a railway station located in Sauwerd, The Netherlands. The station was opened on 15 June 1884 and is located on the Groningen–Delfzijl railway and the Sauwerd–Roodeschool railway. The train services are operated by Arriva.

== Train service ==
The following services currently call at Sauwerd:

- 2x per hour local service (stoptrein) Groningen - Roodeschool
- 2x per hour local service (stoptrein) Groningen - Delfzijl
