= Groningen–Delfzijl railway =

Railway line in the Netherlands

Groningen-Delfzijl railway
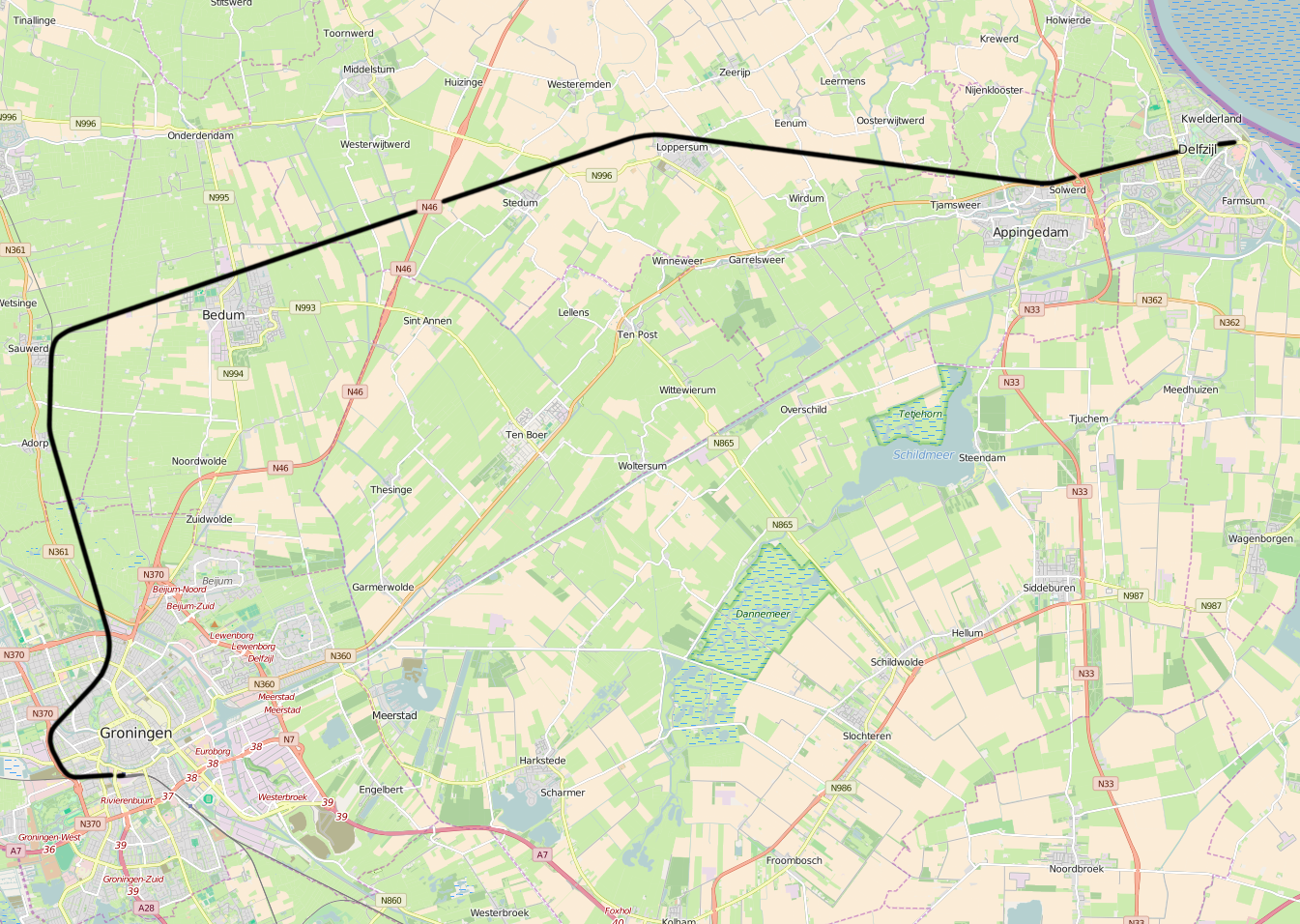

Overview
- Status: Operational
- Locale: Groningen, Netherlands
- Termini: Groningen railway station; Delfzijl railway station
- Stations: 9

History
- Opened: 15 June 1884

Technical
- Line length: 77 km (48 mi)
- Number of tracks: mostly single track
- Track gauge: 1,435 mm (4 ft 8 1/2 in) standard gauge
- Electrification: no

The Groningen–Delfzijl railway is a railway line in the Netherlands running from Groningen to Delfzijl, passing through Sauwerd, Loppersum and Appingedam. The line was opened in 1884.

== Stations ==
The stations on the railway are:

- Groningen: to Leeuwarden, Delfzijl and Bad Nieuweschans
- Groningen Noord
- Sauwerd: to Roodeschool
- Bedum
- Stedum
- Loppersum: bus services 42, 45, 62, 660 and 662
- Appingedam: bus services 40, 61, 78, 91, 95 and 140
- Delfzijl West
- Delfzijl: bus services 40, 43, 61, 96, 119, 140 and 245

== Train service ==
Services are operated by Arriva. From Monday to Saturday trains run 2x per hour between 5am and 8pm. On all other times trains run 1x per hour
