= Tal Zilber =

Israeli-born pianist and composer

Tal Zilber טל זילבר
- Born: Israel
- Origin: Israel
- Occupations: Pianist, composer
- Instrument: Piano
- Website: talzilber.com

Tal Zilber (Hebrew: טל זילבר) is an Israeli-born pianist and composer. He holds an M.M. from Rice University, a Performance Diploma from Indiana University, and a B.M. from the Rubin Israeli Music Academy. He has studied under Brian Connelly, Edmund Battersby, Michael Boguslavsky, Alexander Volkov, Ran Blake, Bert Seager and Wha Kyung Byun. He is completing a Doctorate Degree in Contemporary Improvisation at the New England Conservatory.

== Early years ==
Zilber was born in Israel, but has moved to the United States.

== Career ==
Zilber has a career known as "unusually diverse", involving classical, pop, and jazz performances. At present, 2017, he moved only to teach in Alon High School in Ramat Hasharon as part of the musical course.

=== Composing ===
Zilber's compositions have been performed by the Carmel String Quartet, the Be’er Sheva Symphony Orchestra, the Worcester Youth Symphony Orchestra and the Boston City Singers choir. He has participated in numerous musical competitions and festivals, and his pieces have been broadcast on Spanish public radio.

=== Arranging ===
Zilber is also known for his arrangements of popular pieces, including Tico-Tico no Fubá and I Will Survive.

=== Accompaniment ===
Zilber was an accompanist for Boston City Singers Tour Choir, under direction of Jane Money and Kimani Lumsden, until June 2017.
