= Groningen Noord railway station =

Railway station in Groningen, Netherlands

Groningen Noord
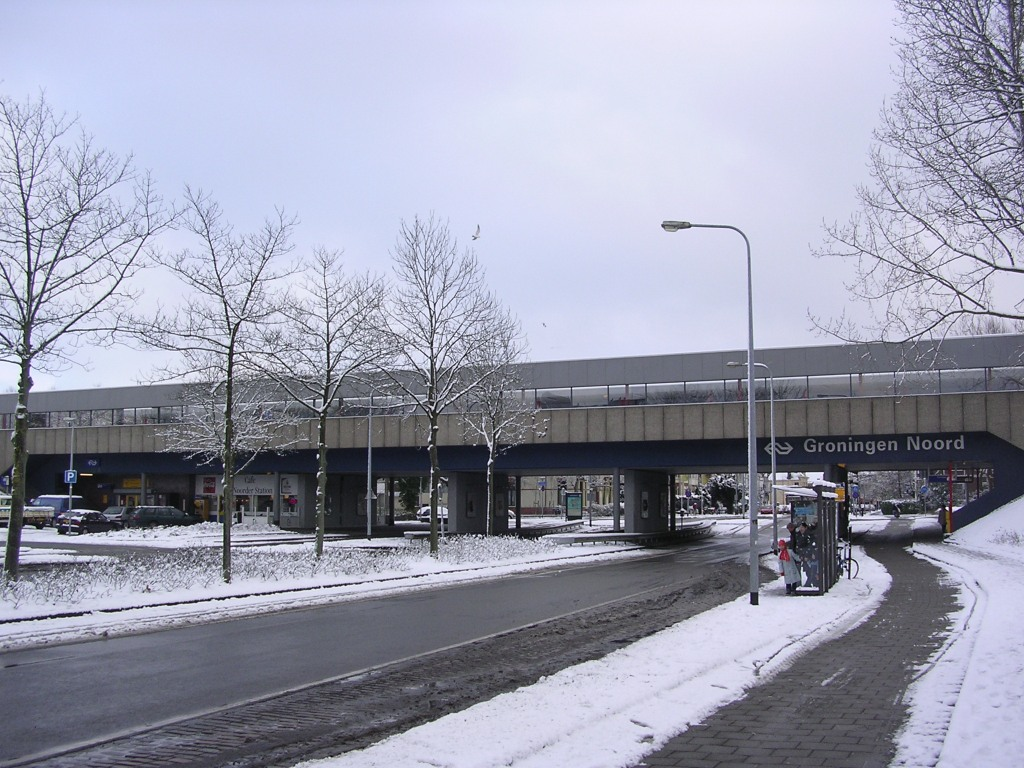
- Groningen Noord railway station in 2005

General information
- Location: Groningen, Netherlands
- Coordinates: 53°13′48″N 6°33′23″E
- Line: Groningen–Delfzijl railway

Other information
- Station code: Gnn

History
- Opened: 15 June 1884

Services
Preceding station	Arriva Netherlands	Following station
Groningen Terminus	Stoptrein 37600	Sauwerd towards Eemshaven
Groningen Terminus	Stoptrein 37700	Sauwerd towards Delfzijl
Location
- Location within Netherlands

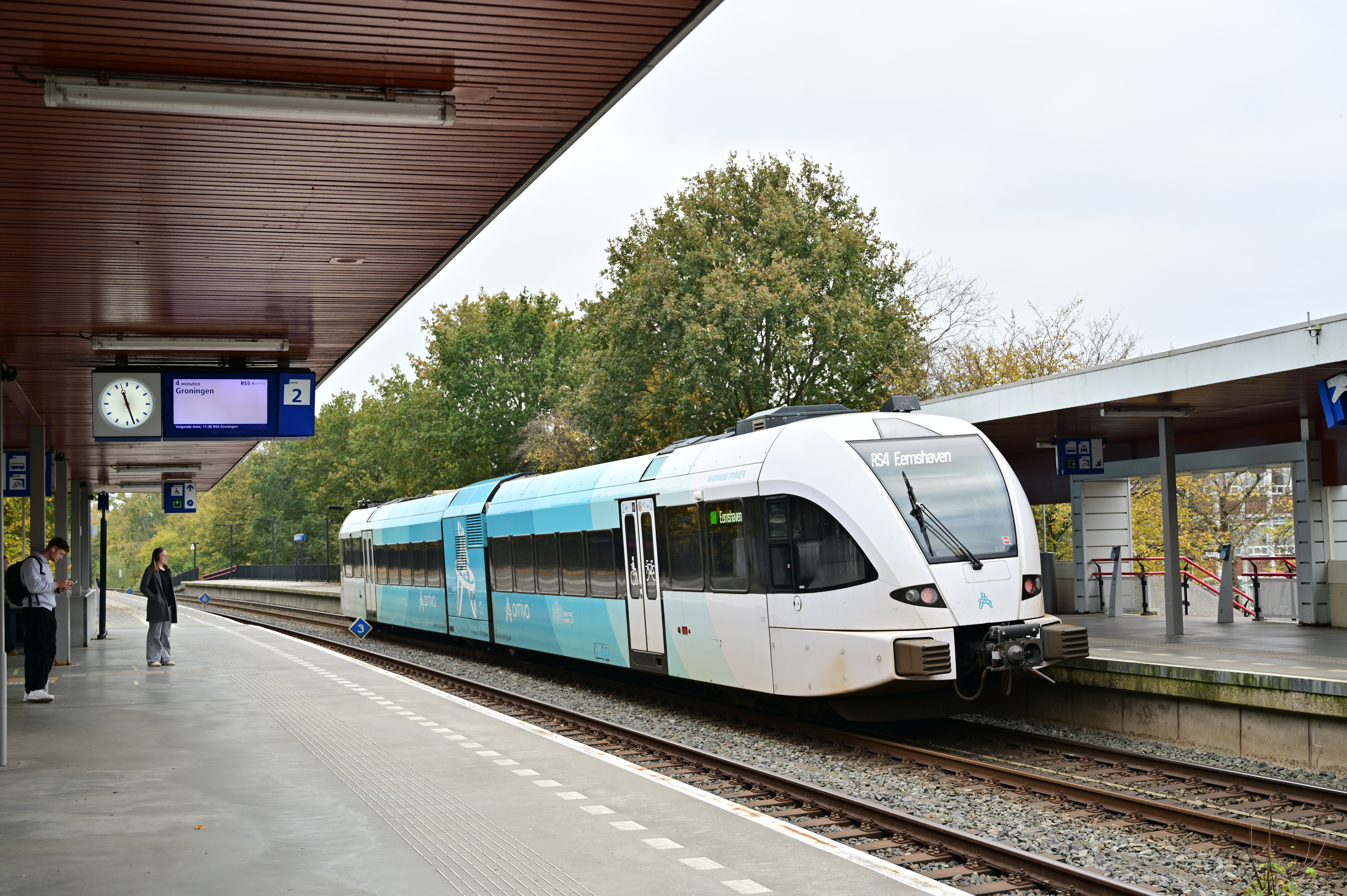
Arriva Stadler GTW departing Groningen Nord towards Eemshaven (2024)

Groningen Noord (Dutch pronunciation: [ˌɣroːnɪŋə ˈnoːrt]; abbreviation: Gnn) is a railway station located Groningen, Netherlands. The station was opened on 15 June 1884 and is located on the Groningen–Delfzijl railway. The train services are operated by Arriva.

== Train service ==
The following services currently call at Groningen Noord:

- 2x per hour local service (stoptrein) Groningen - Eemshaven
- 2x per hour local service (stoptrein) Groningen - Delfzijl
