= Stedum, Germany =

Village in Lower Saxony, Germany

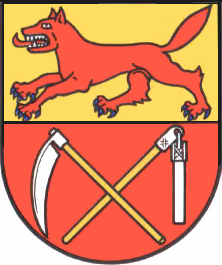
Coat of arms of Stedum

Stedum is a village in Lower Saxony, Germany that belongs to the Hohenhameln Community; about 30 km south of Hanover, 14 km east of Hildesheim and 11 km west of Peine.

Stedum has 513 residents, whereas the Hohenhameln Community as a whole has 9.311 residents.

The waste company (A+B Peine) for Hohenhameln and surroundings is located in Stedum. Other firms operating in the village include the volunteer fire department, the marksman corps, MTV Germania (sport club), Junggesellschaft (boys club), Beeke-Mädchen (girls club), and the Stedum-Bekum fondation.
