= Hohenhameln =

- Municipality
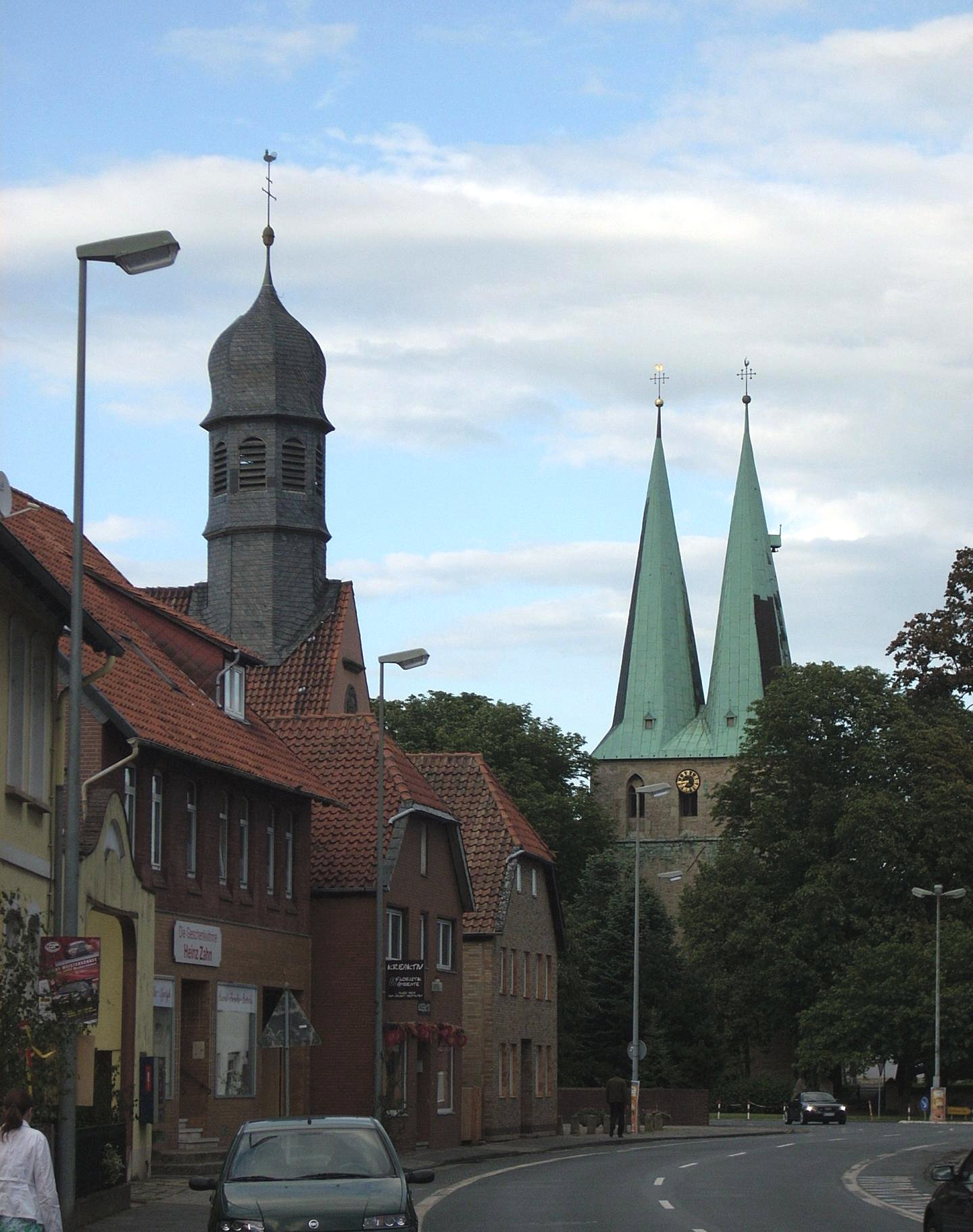
- Village center

- Coat of arms

- Location of Hohenhameln within Peine district
- Interactive map of Hohenhameln
- Location within Germany Location within Lower Saxony
- Coordinates: 52°15′36″N 10°03′59″E
- Country: Germany
- State: Lower Saxony
- District: Peine

Government
  - Mayor (2021–26): Uwe Semper (SPD)

Area
  - Total: 69.59 km^{2} (26.87 sq mi)
- Elevation: 101 m (331 ft)

Population (2025-12-31)
  - Total: 9,411
  - Density: 135.2/km^{2} (350.3/sq mi)
- Time zone: UTC+01:00 (CET)
  - Summer (DST): UTC+02:00 (CEST)
- Postal codes: 31249
- Dialling codes: 05128
- Vehicle registration: PE
- Website: www.hohenhameln.de

Hohenhameln (German pronunciation: [ˌhoːənˈhaːml̩n]) is a municipality in the district of Peine, in Lower Saxony, Germany. It is situated approximately 15 km southwest of Peine, 15 km northeast of Hildesheim and 25 km southeast of Hanover.

== Places that belong to the Hohenhameln community ==
Sculpture Mea Dea by Dieter Homeyer in Bründeln, july 2026, depicted in SbS 3D

Hohenhameln, Soßmar, Clauen, Bierbergen, Bründeln, Equord, Harber, Mehrum, Ohlum, Rötzum, Stedum

== Twinnings ==
- Hankasalmi, Finland
