= Groningen railway station =

Railway station in the Netherlands

Groningen
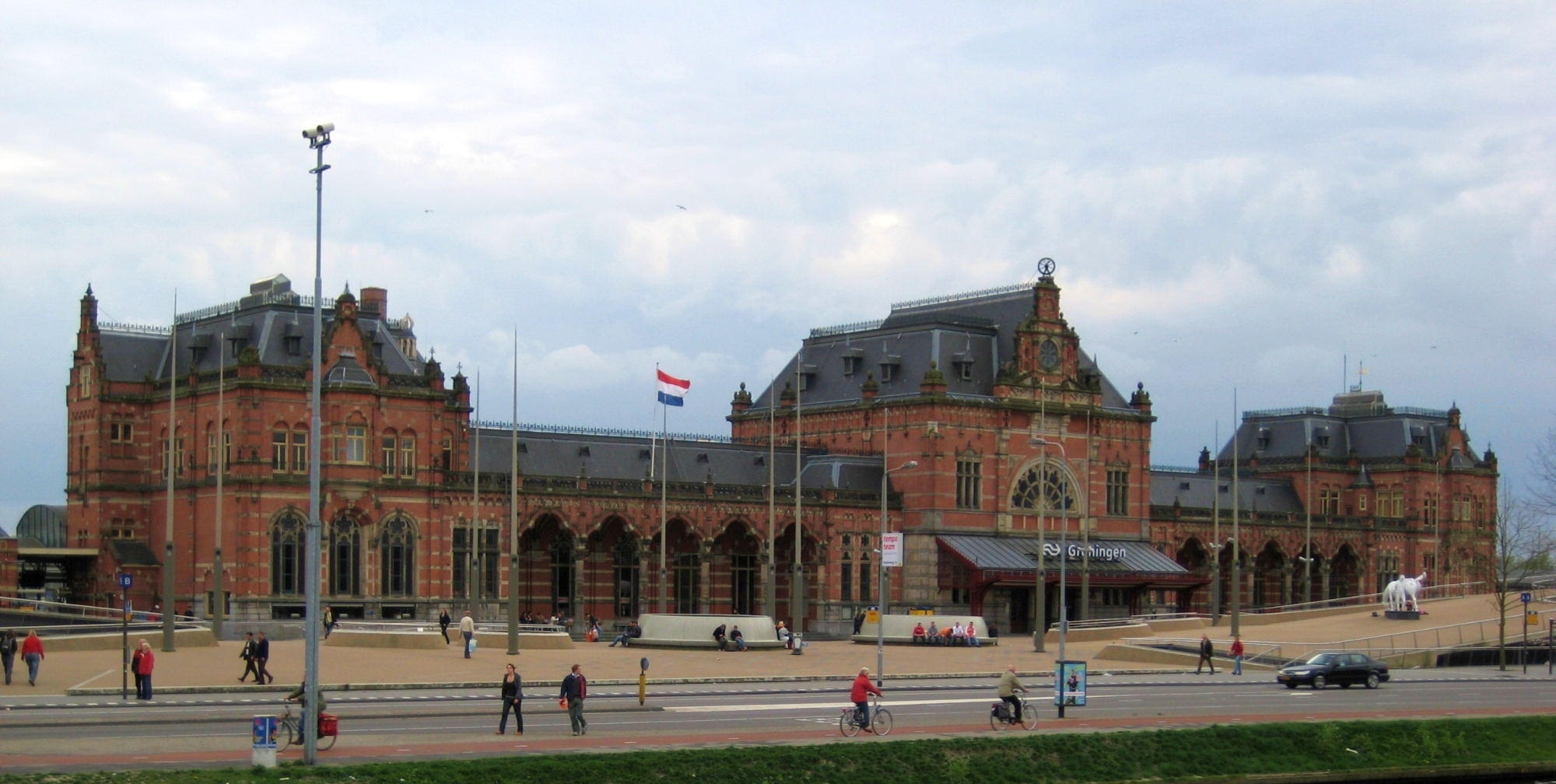
- Groningen railway station in 2008

General information
- Location: Stationsplein 4 Groningen, Province of Groningen, Netherlands
- Coordinates: 53°12′38″N 6°33′53″E
- Lines: Groningen–Delfzijl railway Harlingen–Nieuweschans railway Meppel–Groningen railway
- Train operators: Nederlandse Spoorwegen; Arriva
- Bus operators: Qbuzz
- Connections: 41 bus lines

Construction
- Architect: Izaak Gosschalk
- Architectural style: Neo-Gothic, Neo-Renaissance

Other information
- Station code: Gn

History
- Opened: 1 June 1866
Services
Preceding station	Nederlandse Spoorwegen	Following station
Terminus	NS Intercity 500	Assen towards Den Haag Centraal
Terminus	NS Intercity 700	Assen towards Schiphol Airport
Terminus	NS Sprinter 6100	Groningen Europapark towards Zwolle
Preceding station	Arriva Netherlands	Following station
Terminus	Stoptrein 20100	Groningen Europapark towards Leer
Buitenpost towards Leeuwarden	Sneltrein 37300	Terminus
Zuidhorn towards Leeuwarden	Stoptrein 37400	Terminus
Terminus	Stoptrein 37500	Groningen Europapark towards Bad Nieuweschans
Terminus	Stoptrein 37600	Groningen Noord towards Eemshaven
Terminus	Stoptrein 37700	Groningen Noord towards Delfzijl
Terminus	Stoptrein 37800	Groningen Europapark towards Veendam
Terminus	Nachttrein 32780 Friday night only	Assen towards Schiphol Airport
Location
- Location within Netherlands

Groningen railway station (Dutch pronunciation: [ˈɣroːnɪŋə(n)]; abbreviation: Gn), locally called Hoofdstation (main station), is the main railway station in Groningen in the Province of Groningen, Netherlands. It is located on the Harlingen–Nieuweschans railway between Zuidhorn and Groningen Europapark, on the Meppel–Groningen railway as terminus after Groningen Europapark, and on the Groningen–Delfzijl railway as terminus after Groningen Noord.

The first station building was completed in 1865 and demolished in 1894. The second and current station building was designed by Izaak Gosschalk, completed in 1896, and most recently restored in 2000. Train services started in 1866 and are currently provided by Nederlandse Spoorwegen and Arriva. There are 41 bus services at the station provided by Qbuzz.

== History ==
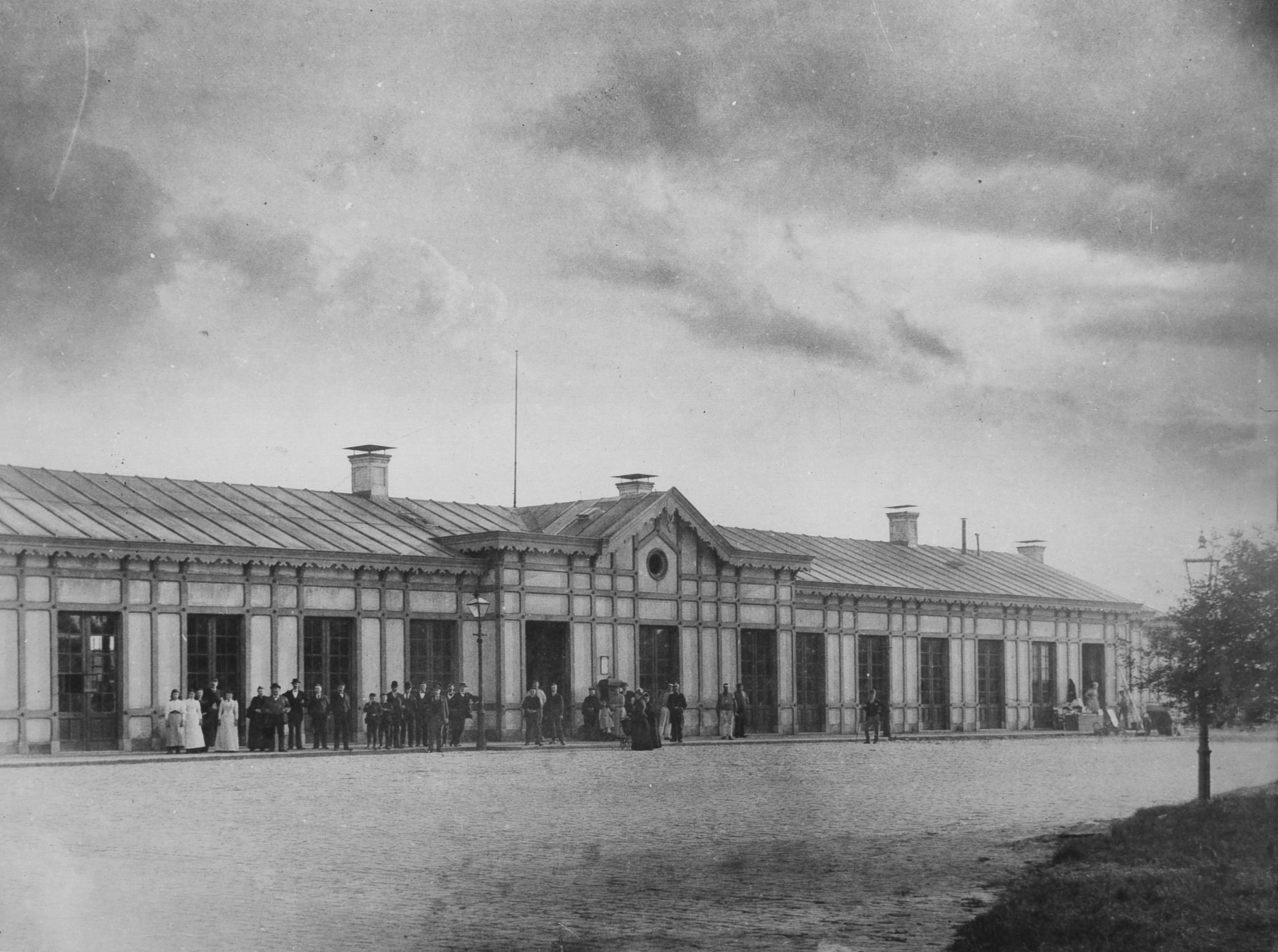
Former station building in 1893

The station opened on 1 June 1866 and is on the Harlingen–Nieuweschans railway. The first building was a temporary structure outside the former fortifications. In 1870, with the Meppel–Groningen railway, the station was connected with the central Netherlands. In 1884 the Groningen–Delfzijl railway opened, and in 1893 the connection to Roodeschool opened. The station building that still stands today was completed in 1896.

== Description ==
=== Location ===
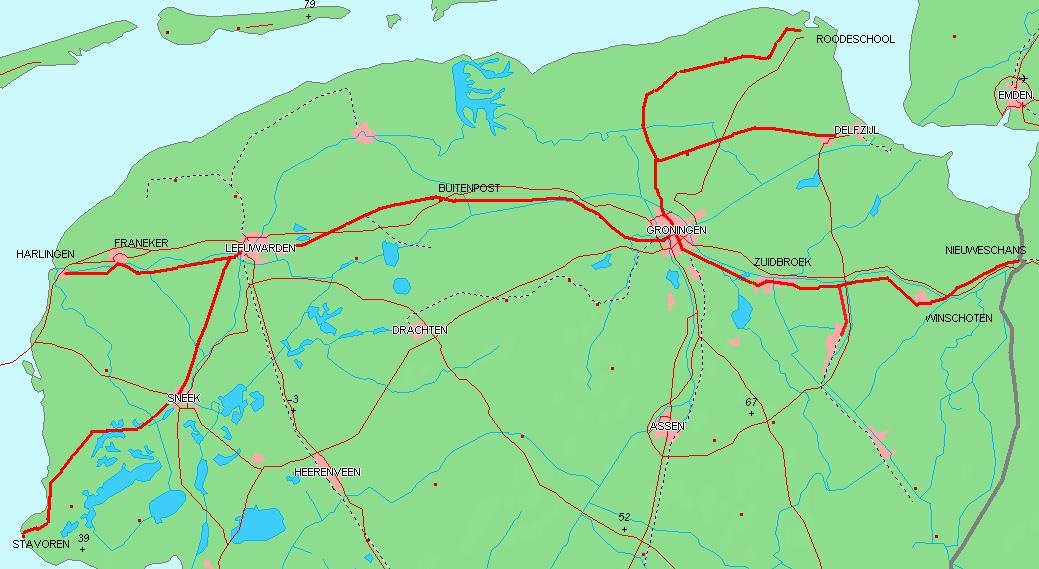
Regional railway lines, operated by Arriva, in the provinces of Friesland and Groningen (main lines not included on this map).

The railway station is located at the Stationsplein in the city of Groningen in the southwest of the province of Groningen in the northeast of the Netherlands.

Groningen is situated on the Harlingen–Nieuweschans railway, also called Staatslijn B, between the railway stations of Zuidhorn and Groningen Europapark. The distance from Groningen westward to railway terminus Harlingen Haven is 80.4 km (50.0 mi), Leeuwarden 55.5 km (34.5 mi), and Zuidhorn 11.7 km (7.3 mi), and eastward to Groningen Europapark is 1.6 km (0.99 mi), Winschoten 34 km (21 mi), and railway terminus Bad Nieuweschans 46.4 km (28.8 mi).

Groningen is the terminus station of the Meppel–Groningen railway, also called Staatslijn C, after the railway station Groningen Europapark. The distance from Groningen southward to the railway station Groningen Europapark is 1.6 km (0.99 mi), Assen 27.6 km (17.1 mi), and the railway terminus Meppel 76.9 km (47.8 mi).

Groningen is also the terminus station of the Groningen–Delfzijl railway before the railway station Groningen Noord. The distance from Groningen northward to the railway station Groningen Noord is 3.9 km (2.4 mi) and the railway terminus Delfzijl 37.8 km (23.5 mi).

The station connects the non-electrified railways in the province of Groningen to the rest of the Dutch railway network in the south.

Under the entry plaza is a bicycle parking garage with space for 4,150 bicycles. Combined with other nearby facilities, there is space for parking over 10,000 bicycles in the station area, as of 2010, with an estimated increase of 500 per year.

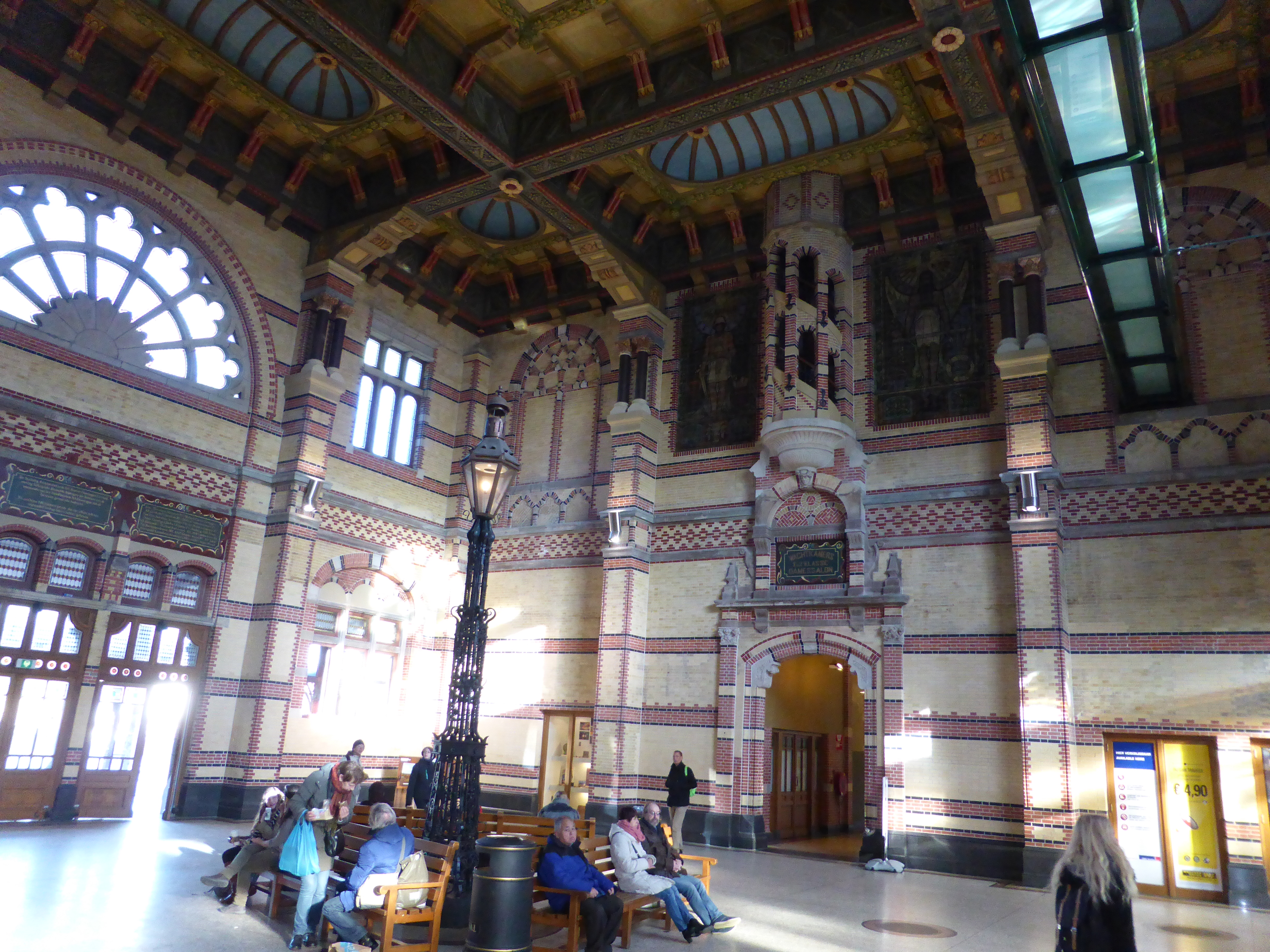
Entrance Hall of the railway station

=== Building ===
The station building was designed by Izaak Gosschalk and combines Neo-Gothic and Neo-Renaissance elements.

=== Layout ===
The station has nine platforms and behind the station is a stabling point for many trains.

=== Future revamp ===
Plans have been announced to drastically change the station layout. The stabling yard behind the station will be moved towards Haren, yielding space for more platforms and a new bus station.

Photo gallery outside of the station building

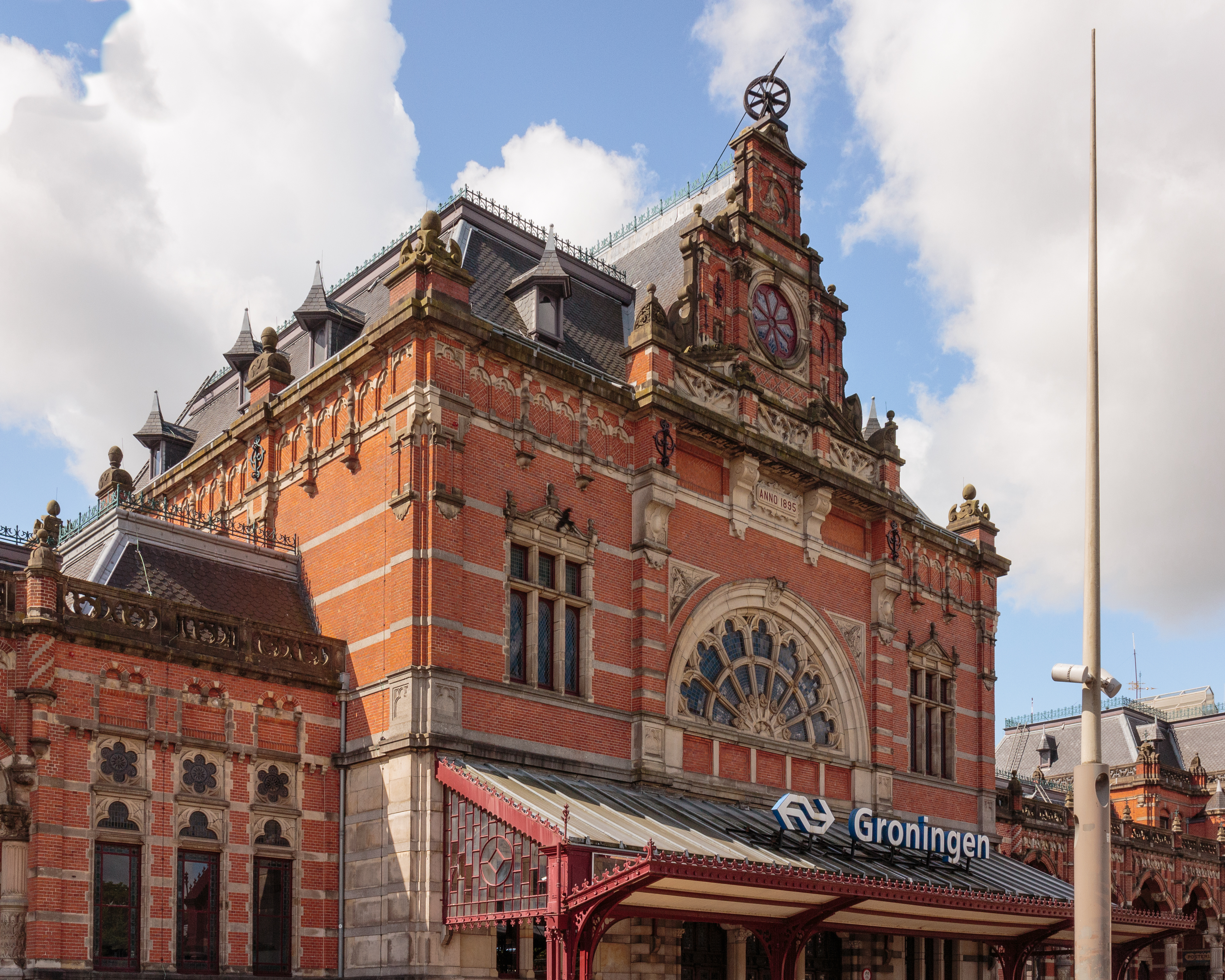
Main building (North North West side)

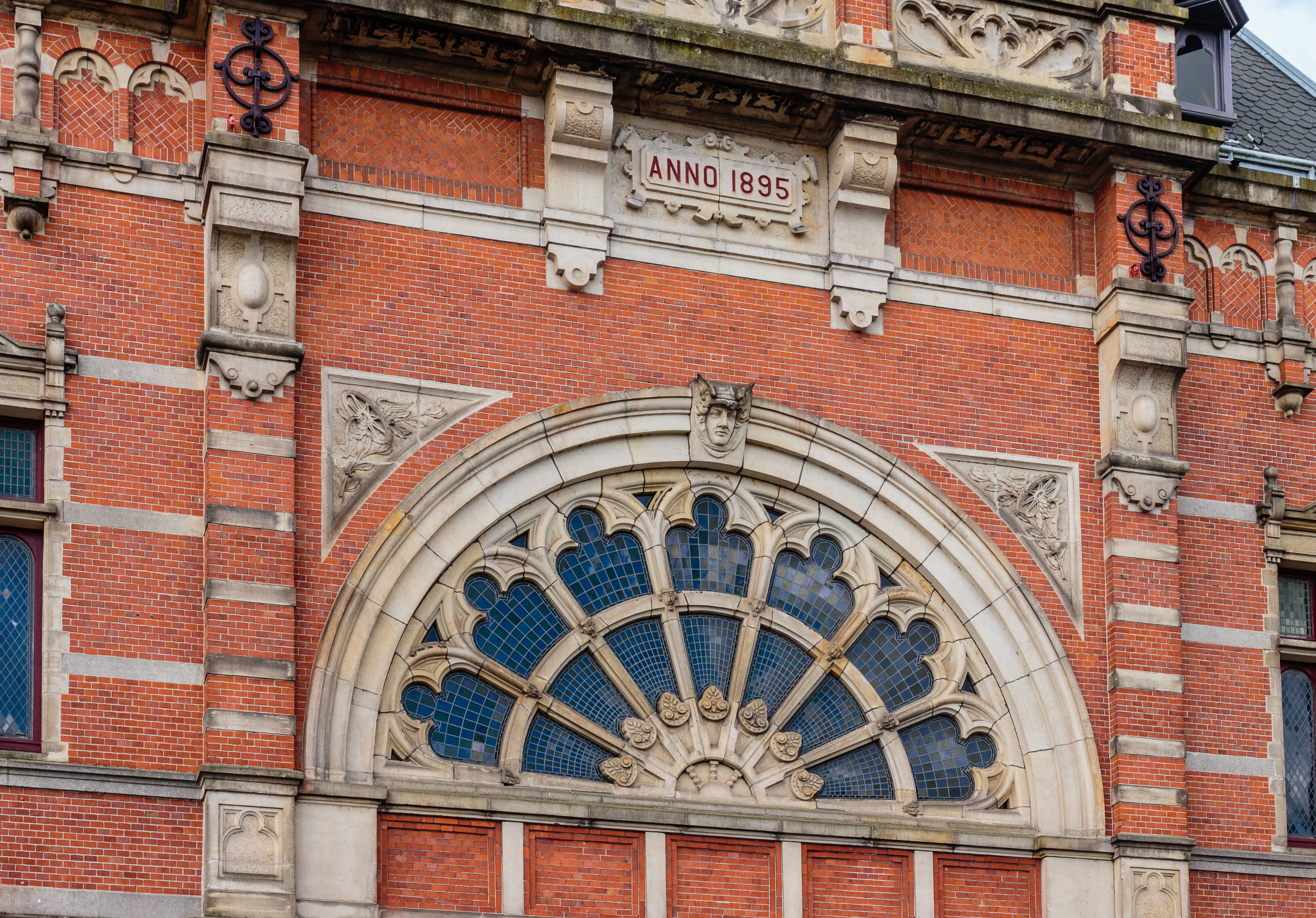
Detail of the main building

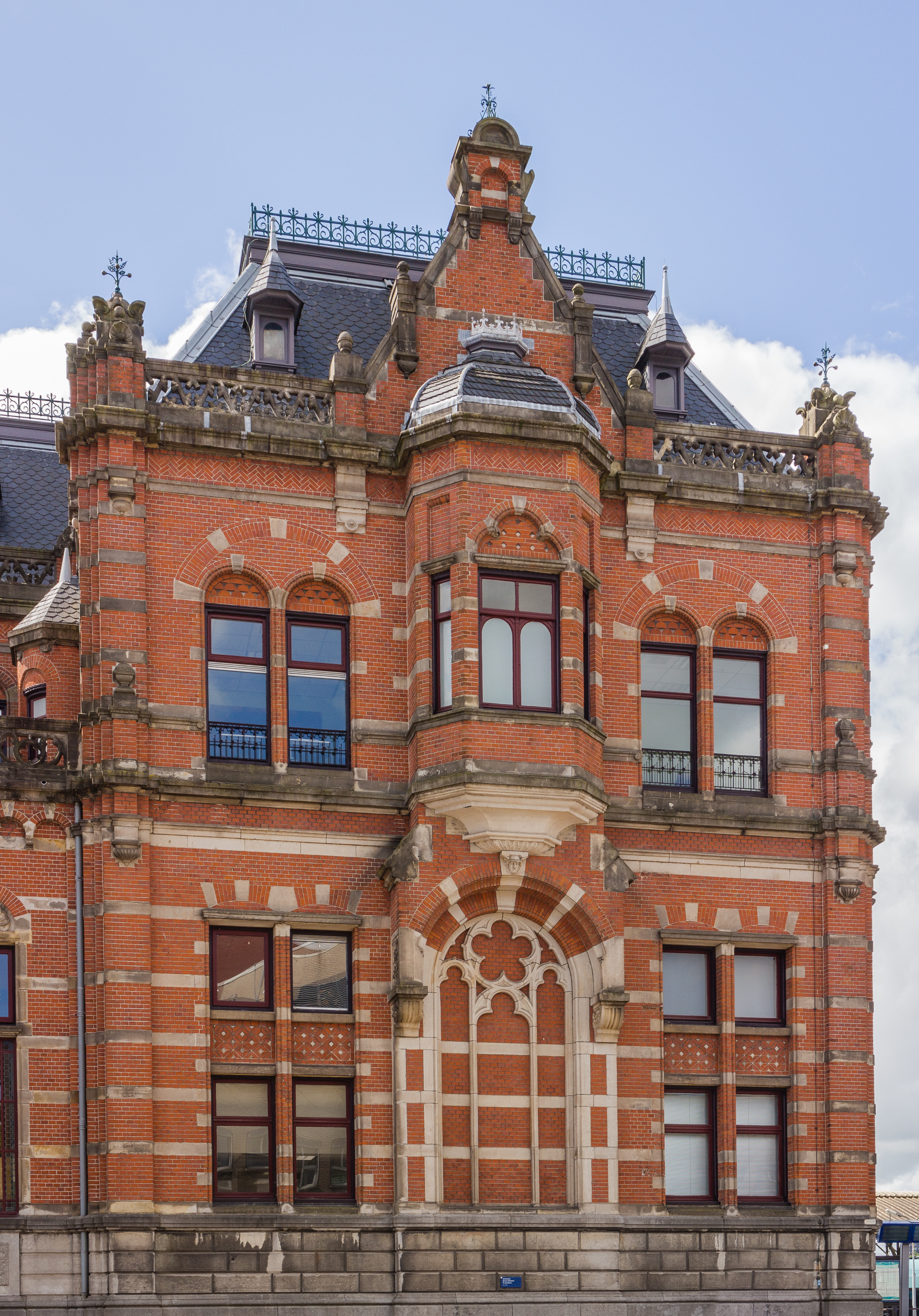
Right building

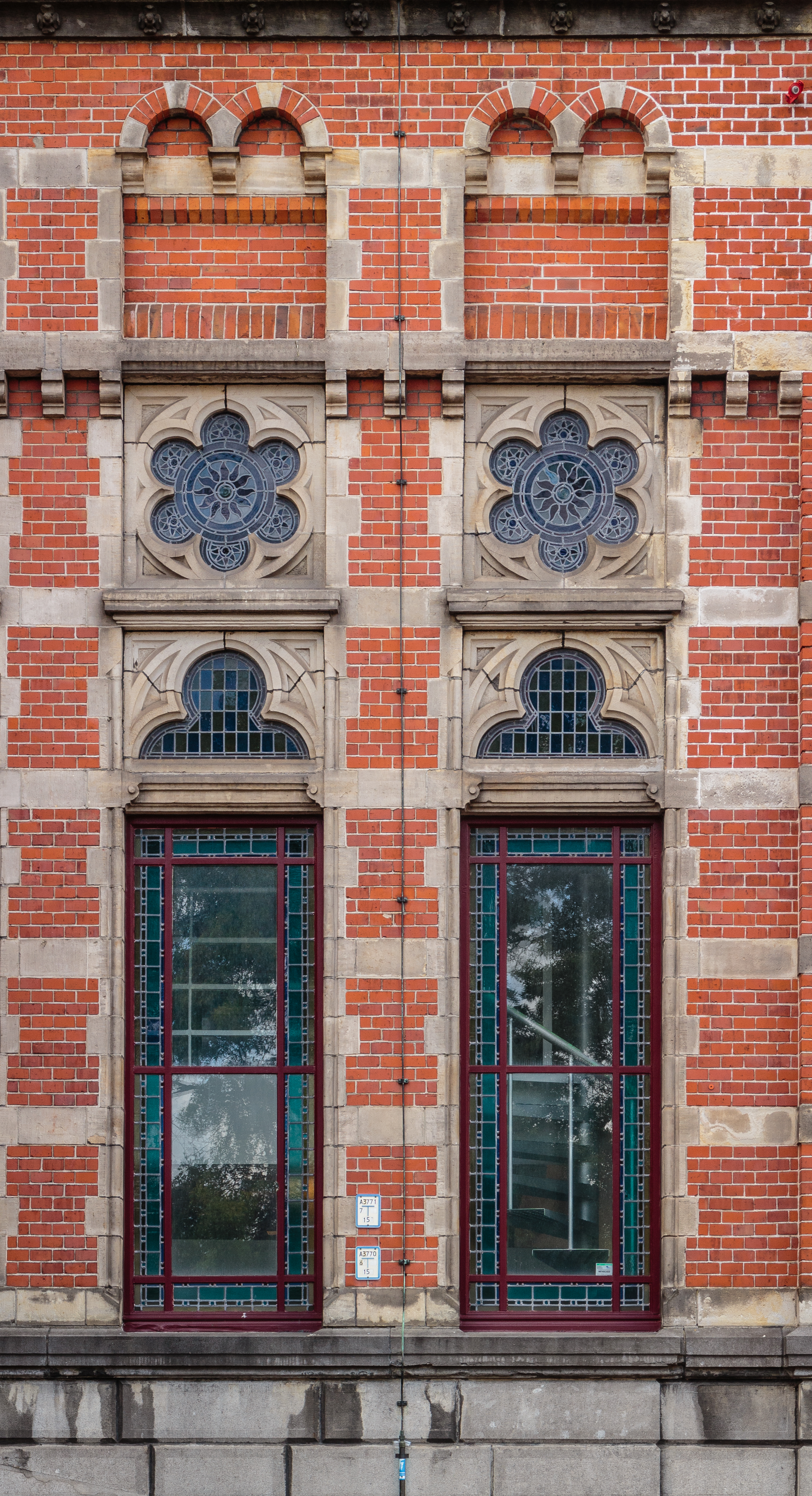
Detail of right building

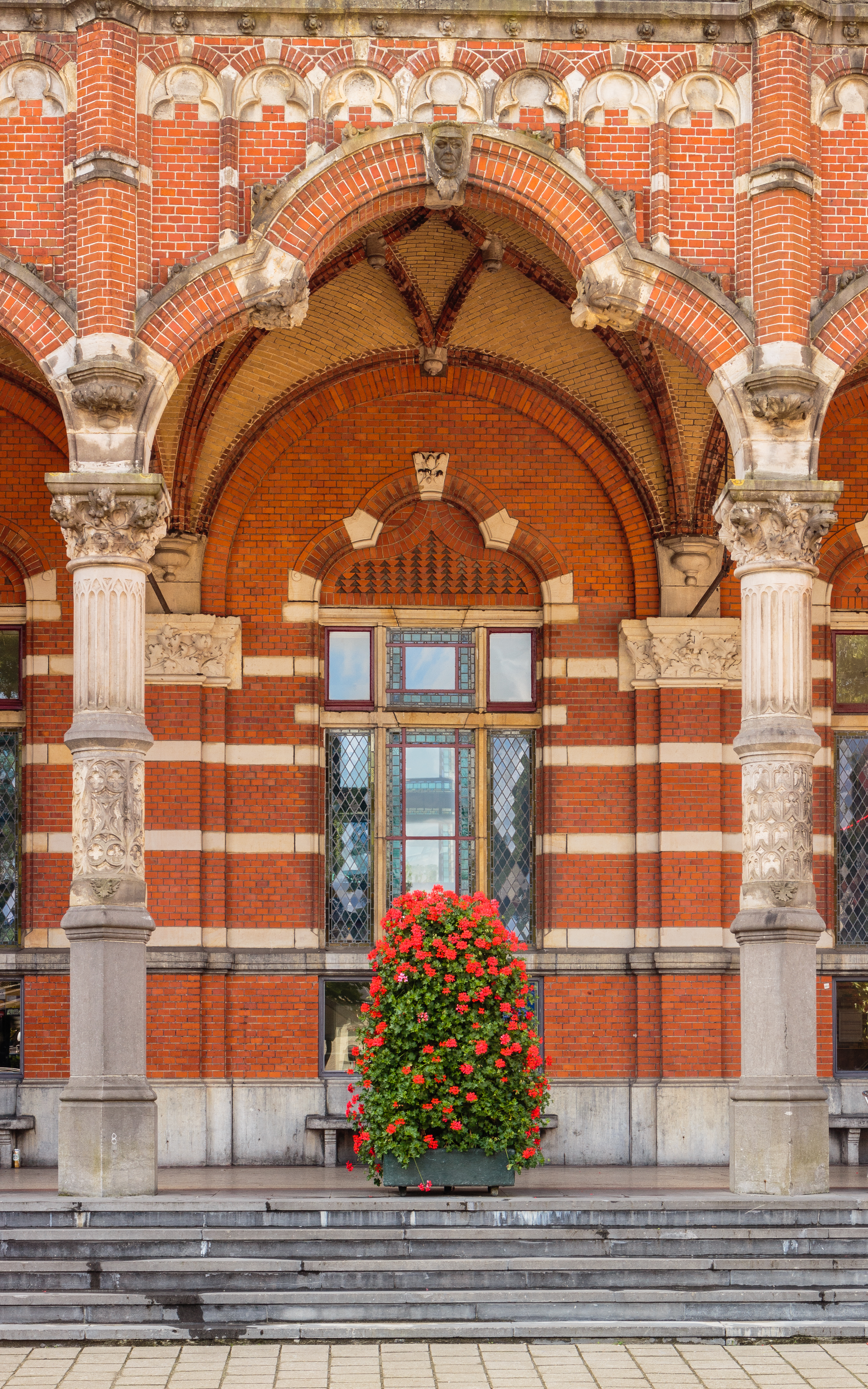
Detail gallery

== Services ==
=== Trains ===
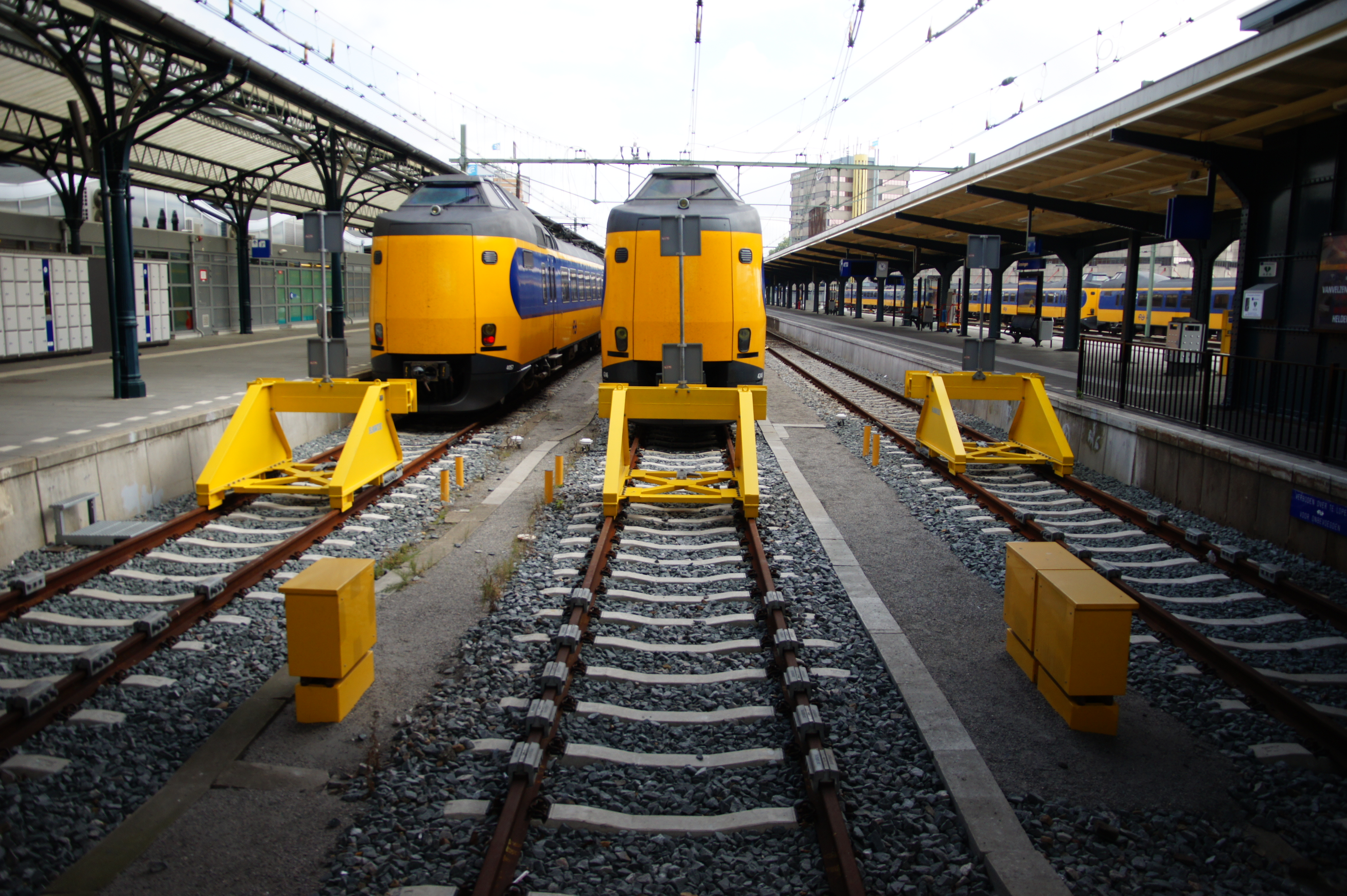
NS intercity trains at the station

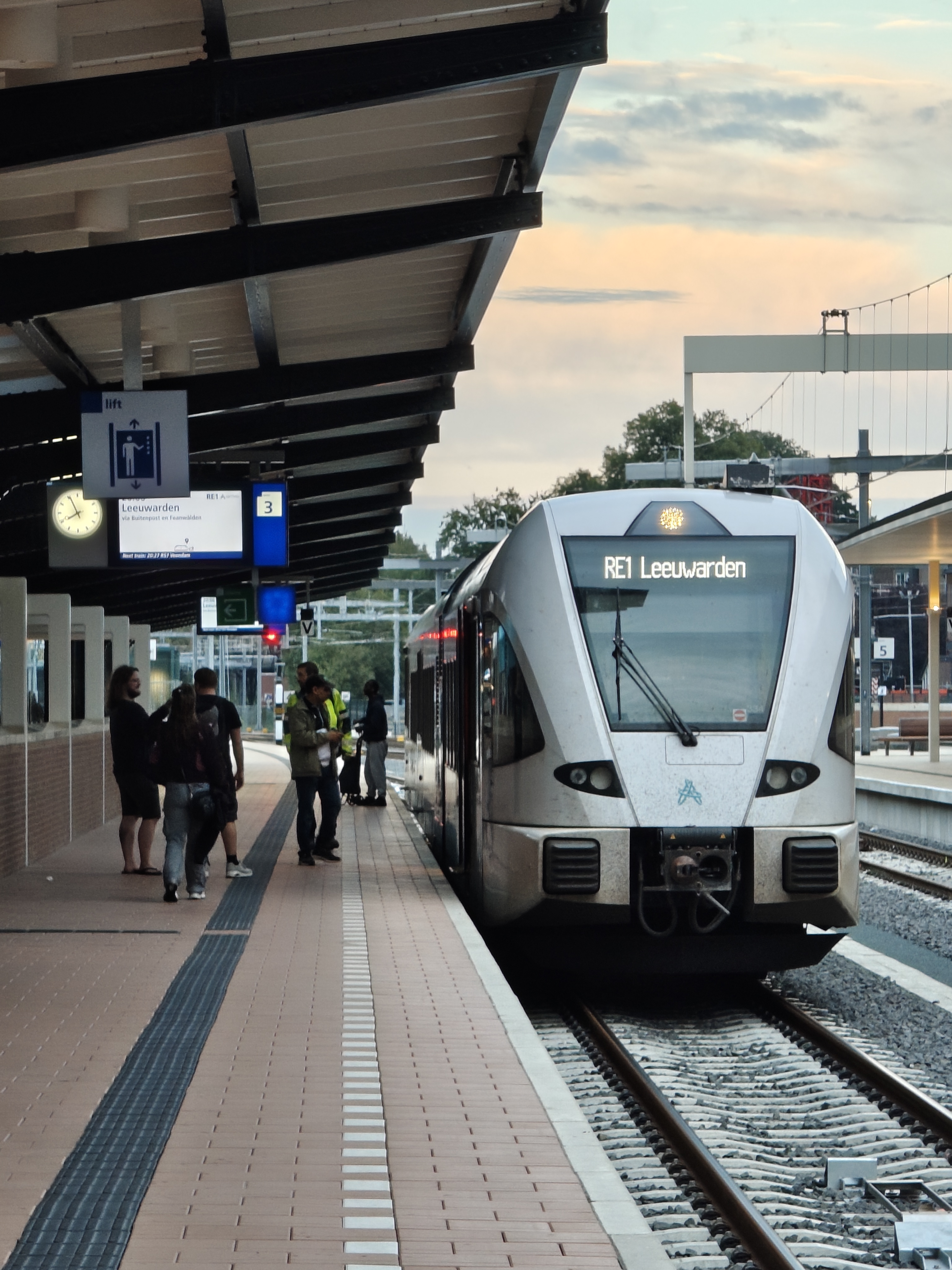
Arriva train at the station (2025)

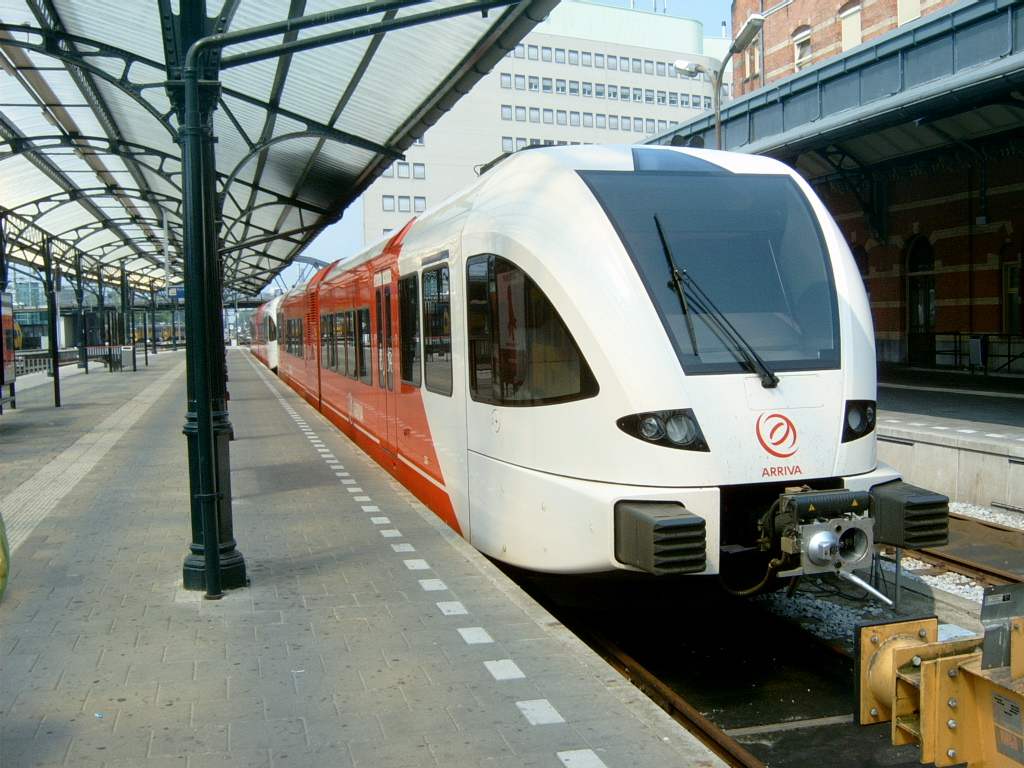
Arriva train at the station (2008)

From Groningen you can directly travel to places such as: Assen, Zwolle, Amersfoort, Utrecht, Gouda, Rotterdam, The Hague, Amsterdam Airport (Schiphol), Hoogeveen, Leeuwarden, Roodeschool (Eemshaven), Delfzijl, Winschoten, Bad Nieuweschans and Leer (Germany).

Groningen is now the most northerly station that Nederlandse Spoorwegen operates, with all services further north operated by Arriva.

The following services operated by the Nederlandse Spoorwegen call at Groningen:

- 1× per hour intercity service Rotterdam – Utrecht – Amersfoort – Zwolle – Groningen
- 1× per hour intercity service The Hague – Schiphol – Almere – Lelystad – Zwolle – Groningen
- 2× per hour local service (sprinter) Zwolle – Assen – Groningen
- 2× per hour local service (sprinter) Groningen – Assen (Rush hour only)

On Saturday and Sunday the early train to The Hague is merged with series 2600 (Lelystad Centrum – Vlissingen) to Vlissingen railway station, not calling at The Hague Central Station, continuing to Hollands Spoor instead, thereafter running further to Delft, Rotterdam, Dordrecht, Roosendaal and Vlissingen. This service also calls at Amsterdam Central station, Amsterdam Sloterdijk and Lelylaan instead of Duivendrecht and Amsterdam Zuid.

The same happens for the late services on all other days, per hour decreasing in length (starts with Dordrecht, then Rotterdam, Den Haag Hollands Spoor, and lastly Amsterdam Central. The stations Roosendaal and Leiden Centraal are in the same situation, but from station Leeuwarden, not Groningen.). Thereafter, the Intercity services are suspended and replaced by Sprinters. At that time, there is no connection with these cities anymore.

The following services operated by Arriva call at Groningen:

- 1× per hour express service (sneltrein) Leeuwarden – Buitenpost – Groningen
- 2× per hour local service (stoptrein) Leeuwarden – Buitenpost – Groningen
- 2× per hour local service (stoptrein) Groningen – Zuidbroek – Veendam
- 1× per hour local service (stoptrein) Groningen – Zuidbroek – Winschoten – Bad Nieuweschans – Leer
- 1× per hour local service (stoptrein) Groningen – Zuidbroek – Winschoten
- 2× per hour local service (stoptrein) Groningen – Sauwerd – Roodeschool (a few times a day: Eemshaven)
- 2× per hour local service (stoptrein) Groningen – Sauwerd – Delfzijl

=== Buses ===
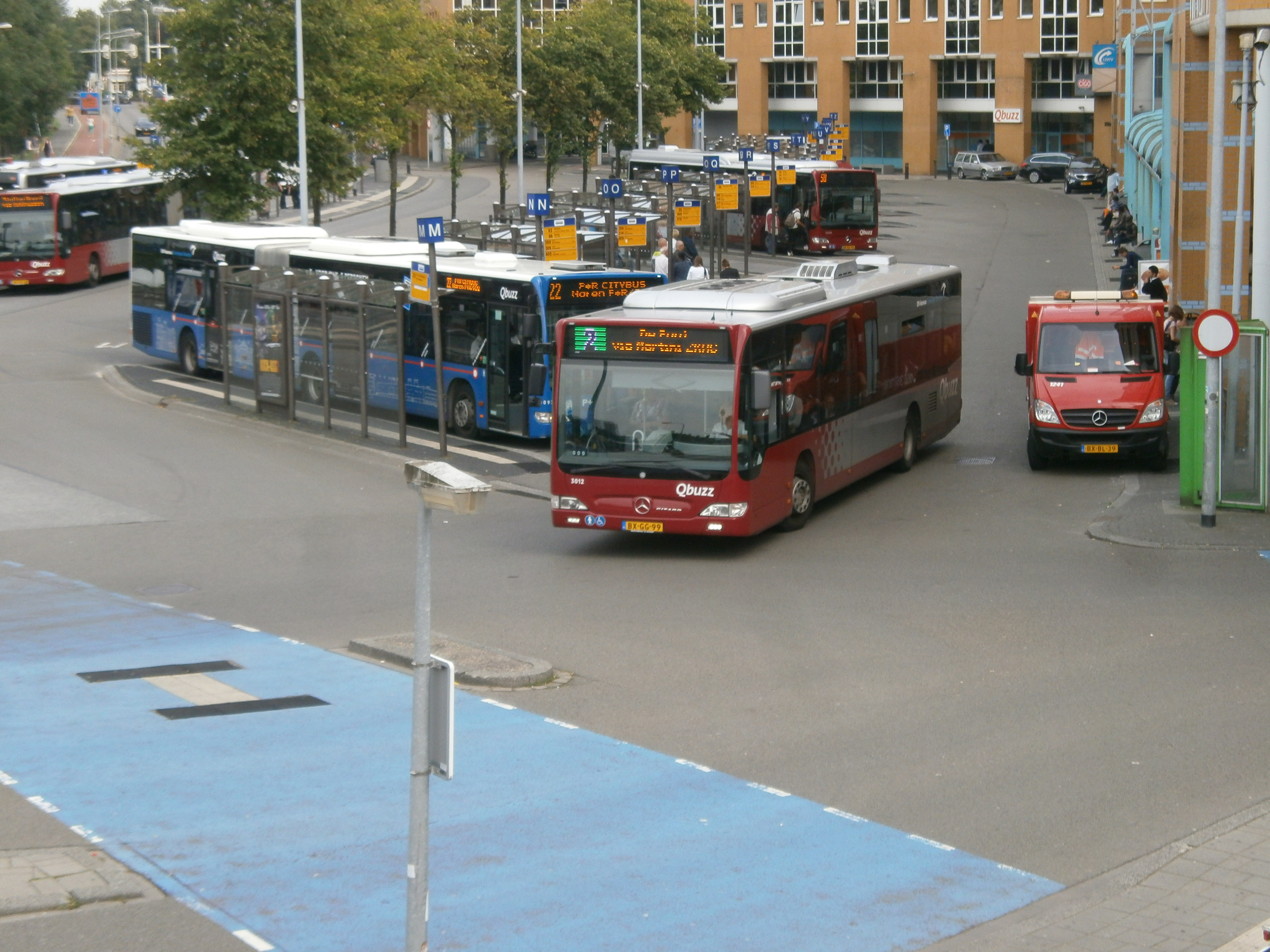
Buses northeast of the railway station in 2013

There are 41 local and regional bus services at the station operated by Qbuzz.
