= List of borgs in Groningen (province) =

This is a list of borgs in Groningen (province).

Castle	Location	Image	Current condition	Type
Allersmaborg	Ezinge, Groningen		Good	Borg
Almaborg	Bedum, Groningen		Demolished	Borg
Asingaborg	Ulrum, Groningen		Demolished	Borg
Batenborg	Maarhuizen, Groningen		Farmhouse	Borg
Beyum	Zuidwolde, Groningen		Demolished	Borg
Breedenborg	Warffum, Groningen		Good	Borg
Coendersborg	Nuis, Groningen		Good	Borg
Dijkhuizen	Tjamsweer, Groningen		Demolished	Borg
Dijksterhuis	Pieterburen, Groningen		Demolished	Borg
Eissingeheem	Uiteinde, Groningen		Demolished	Borg
Ekenstein	Tjamsweer, Groningen		Good	Borg
Elmersmaborg	Hoogkerk, Groningen		Demolished	Borg
Emdaborg	Haren, Groningen		Demolished	Borg
Engersmaborg	Uithuizen, Groningen		Demolished	Borg
Englumborg	Oldehove, Groningen		Demolished	Borg
Ennemaborg	Midwolda, Groningen		Good	Borg
Ewsum Castle	Middelstum, Groningen		Good	Borg
Fraeylemaborg	Slochteren, Groningen		Good	Borg
Huis te Aduard	Aduard, Groningen		Demolished	Borg
Huis te Glimmen	Glimmen, Groningen		Good	Borg
Iwemastins	Niebert, Groningen		Good	Stins
Menkemaborg	Uithuizen, Groningen		Good	Borg
Nienoord	Leek, Groningen		Good	Borg
Onstaborg (Sauwerd)	Sauwerd, Groningen		Demolished	Borg
Onstaborg (Wetsinge)	Wetsinge, Groningen		Demolished	Borg
Piloersemaborg	Den Ham, Groningen		Good	Borg
Rensumaborg	Uithuizermeeden, Groningen		Good	Borg
Rusthoven	Wirdum, Groningen		Good	Borg
Verhildersum	Leens, Groningen		Good	Borg
Warffumerborg (also known as Asingaborg)	Warffum, Groningen		Demolished	Borg
Wedderborg	Wedde, Groningen		Good	Borg
Welgelegen	Hoogezand, Groningen		Good	Borg

== See also ==
- List of castles in the Netherlands
- List of stins in Friesland
