= Verhildersum =

- Leens, Netherlands
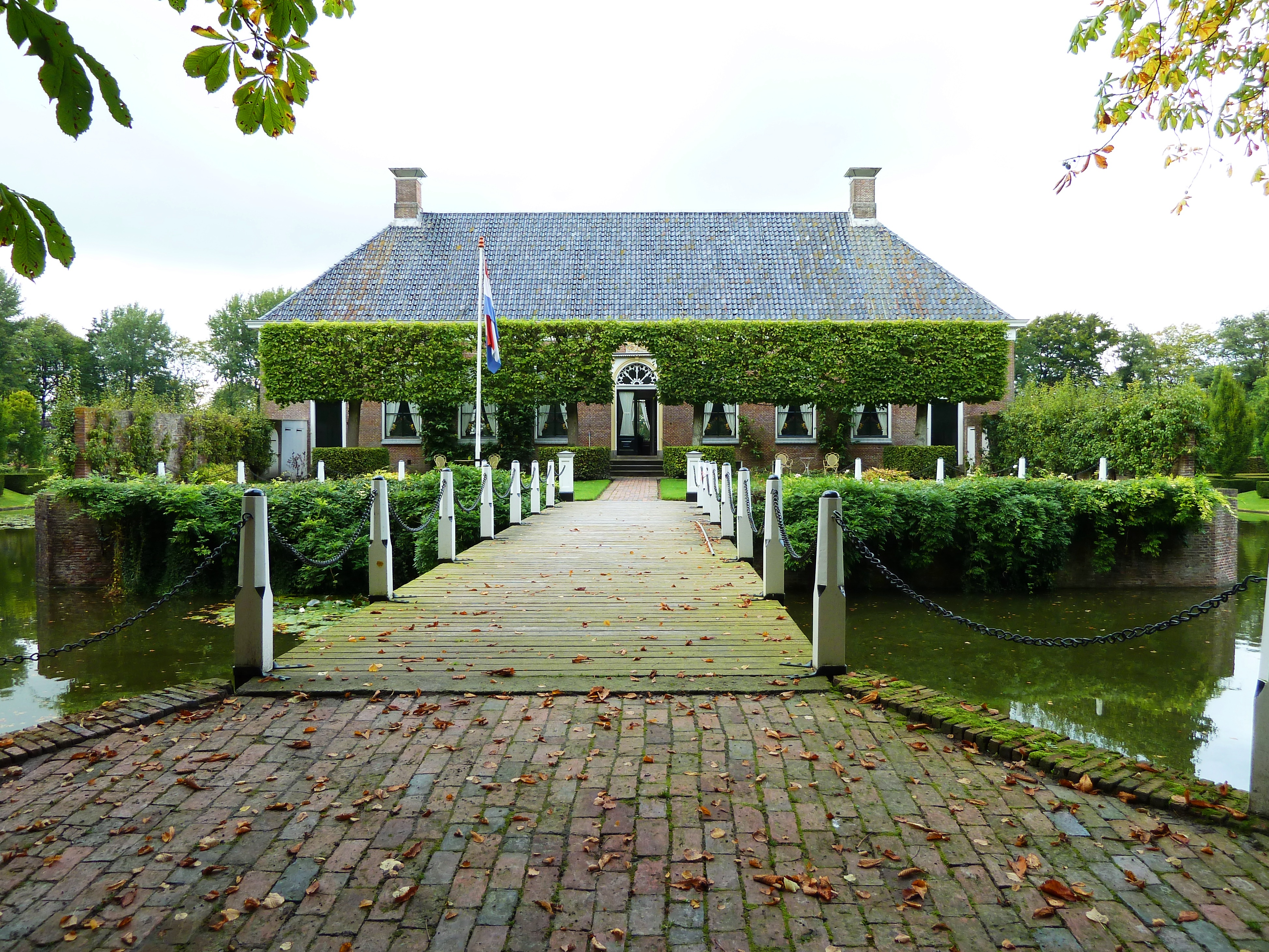
- Front view of the borg

Site information
- Type: Borg
- Open to the public: Yes
- Condition: Museum

Location
- Location in Groningen in the Netherlands
- Coordinates: 53.362538°N 6.393013°E

Site history
- Built: 14th century, proclaimed a borg in 17th century
- Demolished: 1400 and 1514 by Groningen
- Battles/wars: 1400 and 1514 against Groningen

Garrison information
- Occupants: 1398: Aylko Ferhildema 16th century: Aepke Onsta, Eylco Onsta until 1564. 1576: Ecke Claessen 1587: Hidde Onsta Various other occupants after that, including the Van Starkenborgh family

Verhildersum is a borg directly to the east of the town of Leens in the Dutch province of Groningen. It is now a museum.

== Etymology ==
The name Verhildersum comes from Verhildert, where Ver means 'woman' or 'noble woman' and Hilder(t) is a proper name. When this woman lived is unknown. The ending -um in Verhildersum stands for 'house'.

== History ==
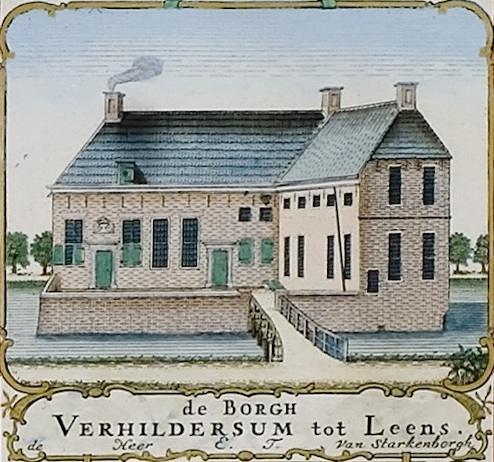
Borg Verhildersum by Theodorus Beckeringh (1781)

The borg dates, as a heerd (a word for farm in Gronings), from the 14th century. It became a borg in the 17th century.

In 1398 a certain Aylko Ferhildema is mentioned, the same person as Aylko Onsta from Sauwerd. The surname Ferhildema could indicate that he (had) lived in Verhildersum. It is unknown whether, after Aylko Onsta, other members of the Onsta family lived in Verhildersum, but it is considered highly probable that the Onsta's kept possession of the borg for some time. One clue to this is that the borg was destroyed in both 1400 and 1514 by the city-Groningers (inhabitants of the city Groningen), just like the Onstaborg. However, in between these two battles no mention of the borg is made in official records. In a document mention is made of the reconstruction of the borg after 1514 for the sum of 1200 gold pieces, excluding some exterior buildings.

After the death of the inhabitant Aepke Onsta in 1564, Ecke Claessen is mentioned as the inhabitant of the borg in 1576. Complaints by him are made with regard to troubles caused by billeted soldiers with their two wives and a child, who reside at the borg due to the Eighty Years' War. During the war Eylco Onsta flees to East Frisia, but despite this keeps calling himself hoofdeling of Wetsinge, Sauwerd and Verhildersum. However, in reality, in 1587, twenty years after the death of Aepke Onsta, it is arranged in the property settlement that not he alone, but he and his sister Hidde Onsta together become owner of the borg Verhildersum. Verhildersum was then a heerd (farm) of 150 yokes (about 75 hectares) on which stood 'the old borg'.

== Estate ==
Around the borg lies the Verhildersum Estate of 32 hectares. In the borg gardens are a carriage house, a farmhouse, and a garden shed.

=== Farmhouse ===
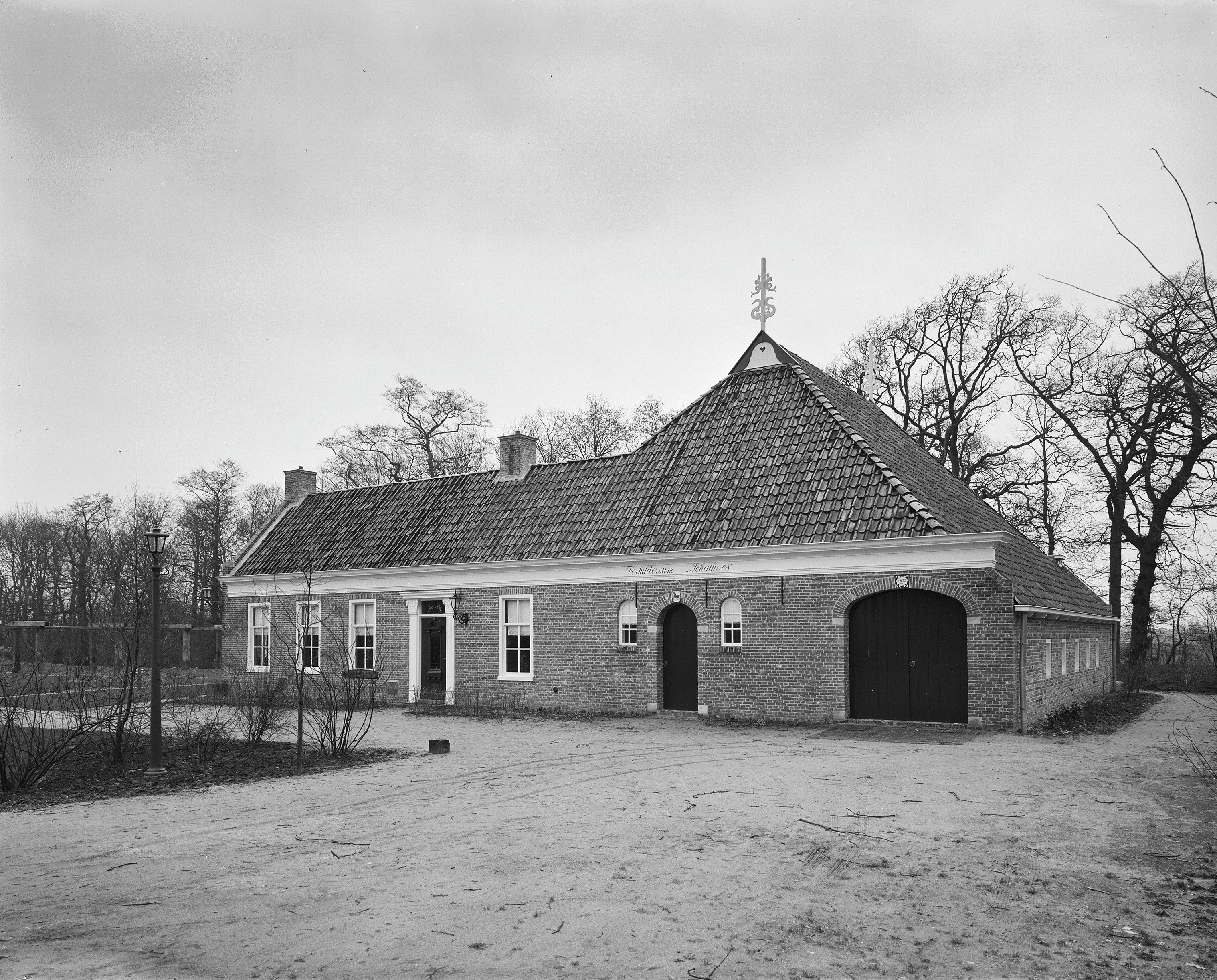
The schathuis in 1974

The schathuis was built originally built in 1833 on the estate of Saaksumborg, a borg which is now demolished. The schathuis used to be a farmhouse and derives its name from the old Frysian word skat, which means cattle. In 1972, the schathuis was moved to the Verhildersum Estate.

From 1994 to 2012, the fine dining restaurant Schathoes Verhildersum of chef Dick Soek was housed in the building. The restaurant had one Michelin star from 2004 to 2012. Since 2012, the grand cafe 't Schathuys is housed in the building.

=== Garden ===
The late-nineteenth-century garden shed is the former 'tramhouse' of the Emmaplein in Haren, Groningen. The borg garden is laid out according to the golden ratio with characteristics from the Renaissance and the Baroque. The garden is also home to a herb garden, more than ninety types of roses and fifty types of Clematis. The garden is surrounded by moates.
