= Onstaborg =

Onstaborg may refer to:

- Onstaborg (Sauwerd), a former borg in Sauwerd, Netherlands
- Onstaborg (Wetsinge), a former borg in Wetsinge, Netherlands
