= Wirdum =

Wirdum may refer to several places:

- Wirdum, Germany, a municipality in Lower Saxony
- Wirdum, Friesland, a village in the Dutch province of Friesland
- Wirdum, Groningen, a village in the Dutch province of Groningen
