= Schathoes Verhildersum =

Coordinates: 53°21′43.8″N 6°23′31.92″E

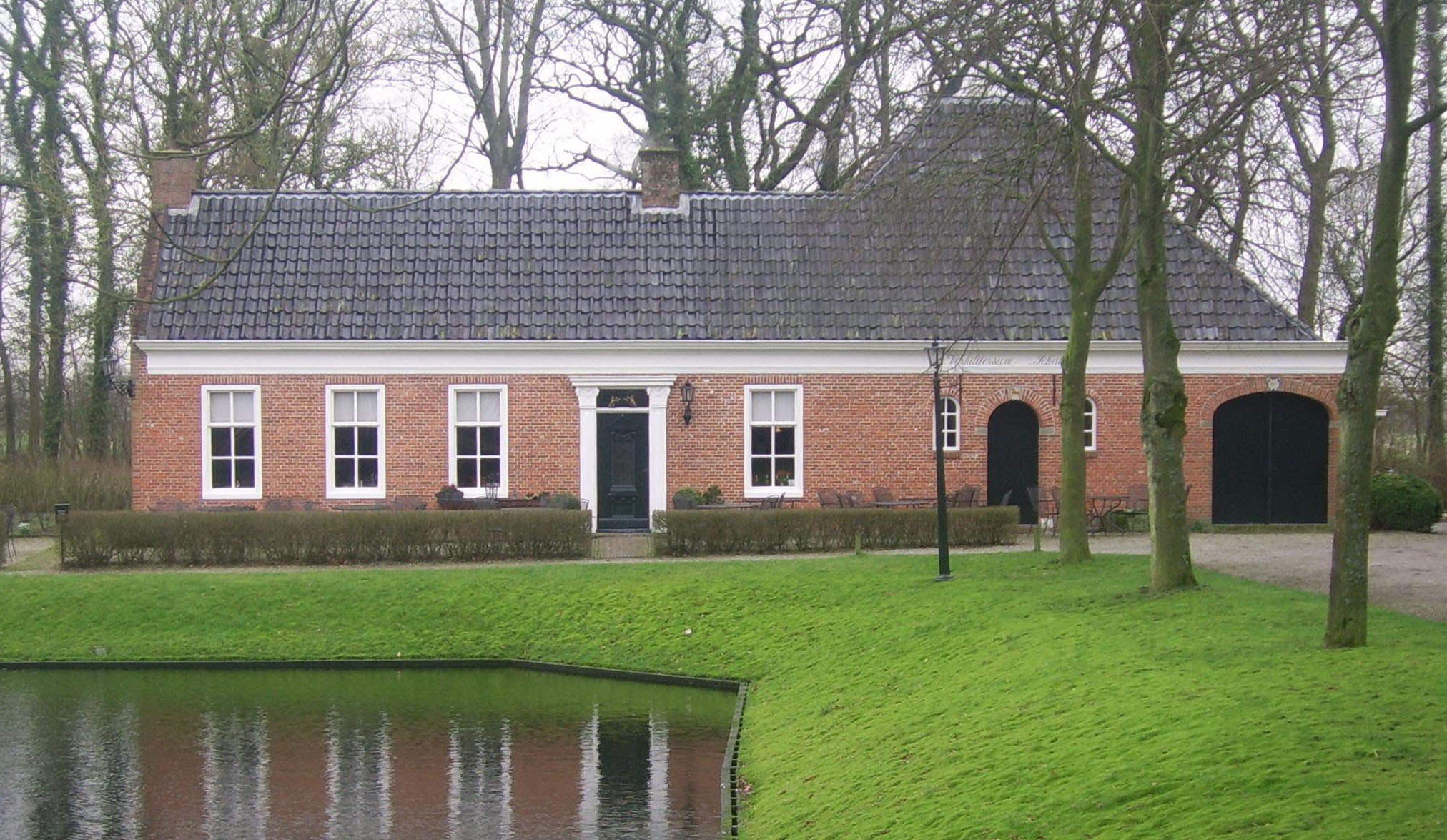
- Schathoes Verhildersum in 2008
- Interactive map of Schathoes Verhildersum

Restaurant information
- Established: 1994
- Closed: 2012
- Head chef: Dick Soek
- Food type: Organic, French, Italian
- Rating: Michelin Guide
- Location: Wierde 42, Leens, 9965 TB, Netherlands

Schathoes Verhildersum was a restaurant in Leens in the Netherlands, on the estate of Verhildersum. It was a fine dining restaurant that was awarded one Michelin star in 2004 and retained that rating until 2012.

Owner and head chef of Schathoes Verhildersum was Dick Soek. He took over the Piloersemaborg in 2005, owning and running two restaurants. In 2012, for practical and economical reasons he moved the restaurant and all staff from Leens to Den Ham, continuing his enterprise on one location. Schathoes lost its Michelin star in the process.

In 1994, Dick Soek took over the "Schathuis" of the borg Verhildersum in Leens. Although "schathuis" literally translates as "treasure house", it was in fact the cow shed, taking its name from the old Frysian word "skat", meaning cattle. The schathuis was at that time a tearoom, and Soek added a fine dining restaurant to it.

In 2003, Elsevier named Schathoes Verhildersum one of the 39 best Italian restaurants in the Netherlands. Head chef Soek explains his Italian style by pointing to his Italian training as a cook and his Italian ideas.

== See also ==
- List of Michelin starred restaurants in the Netherlands
