= Uithuizen Gas Plant =

- NGT Uithuizen
- Shown within the Netherlands
- Alternative names: Gas Treatment Station Uithuizen

General information
- Type: Gas terminal
- Location: Uithuizen, Het Hogeland, Netherlands, Middenweg 2, 9981 VG, Uithuizen
- Coordinates: 53.4593°N 6.6948°E
- Current tenants: Neptune Energy
- Completed: 1975
- Client: NGT

The Uithuizen Gas Plant is a main natural gas terminal in the Netherlands.

== History ==
The plant has been running since 1975. The gas field was discovered in 1970. Neptune Energy now run the site. Neptune Energy have run two natural gas pipelines in the UK. Neptune Energy has also ran the pipeline to the Balgzand Gas Plant, since 2008, which has Dutch, British, Danish and German natural gas.

== Structure ==
The site is close to the most-northern part of the Netherlands, in the north-east of the country.

== Operation ==
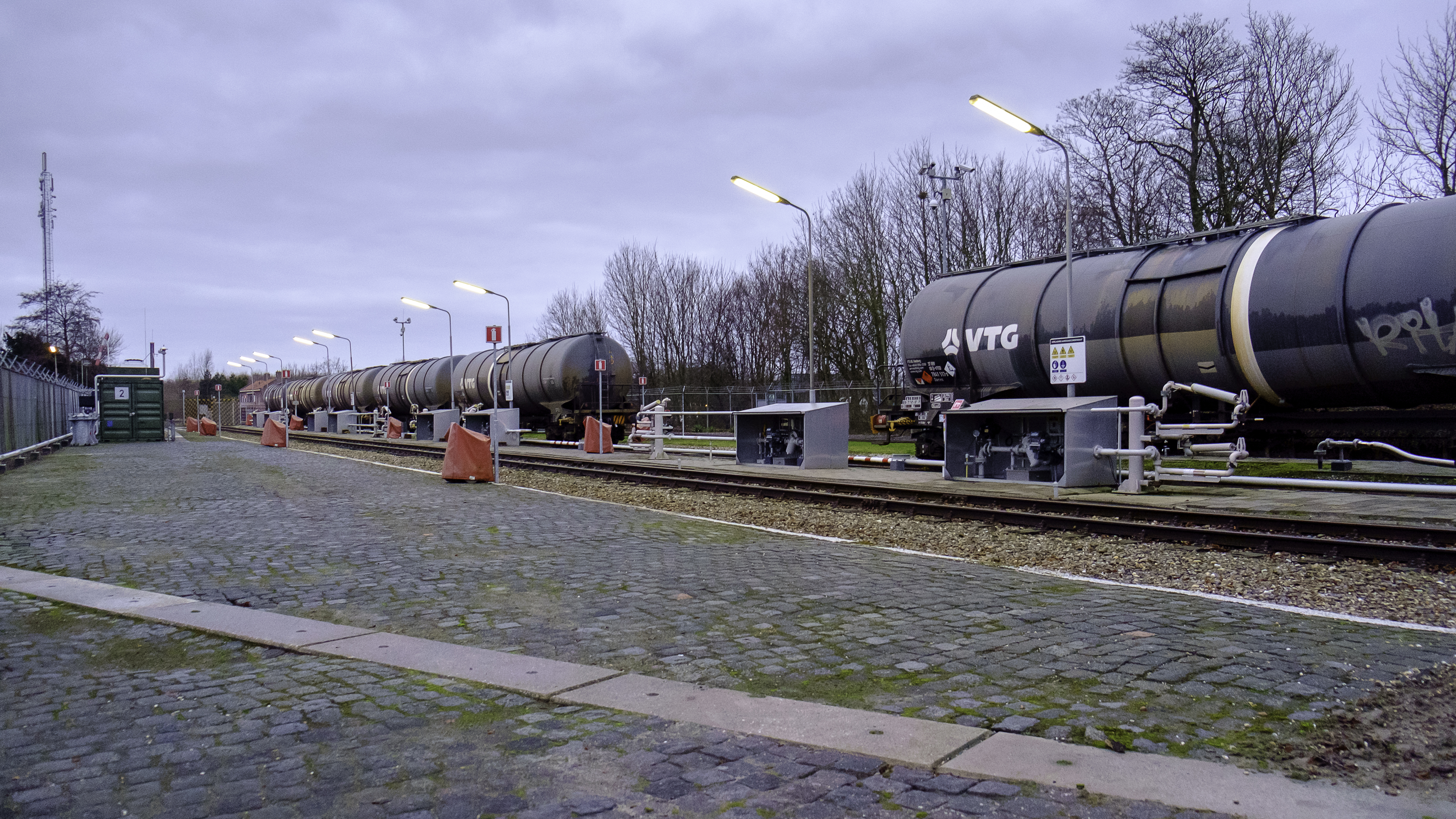
Tanks of gas condensate at Roodeschool railway station, in December 2016

Natural gas reaches the processing plant via 470km of pipelines, from 75 separate platforms.

From the site, the gas is distributed around the Netherlands by Gasunie (Gas Transport Services B.V.). Condensate is transferred along an 8km pipeline to Roodeschool railway station.

Over a year the plant processes 7 billion normal cubic meters of natural gas.

== See also ==
- List of oil and gas fields of the North Sea
