= Rensumaborg =

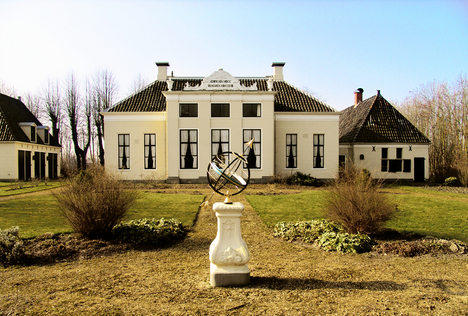
- Rensumaborg in 2007

- Location within Groningen (province)

General information
- Type: Borg
- Location: Rensumalaan 3 Uithuizermeeden, Netherlands
- Coordinates: 53°24′54″N 6°42′50″E

The Rensumaborg is a borg in the village of Uithuizermeeden in Groningen in the Netherlands.
