= Onstaborg (Wetsinge) =

- Wetsinge, Netherlands
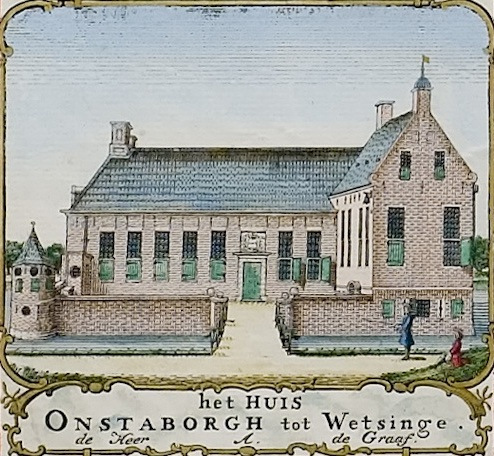
- Onstaborg

Site information
- Type: Borg

Site history
- Built: After the Onstaborg in Sauwerd, (probably around 1500)
- Demolished: 1801

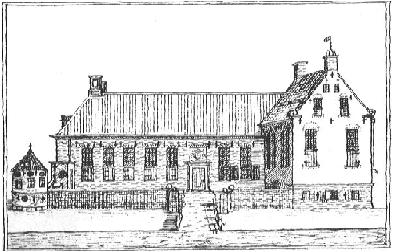
Drawing of the borg, made after it was demolished

Onstaborg (also known as Nieuw Onsta in Dutch, meaning "New Onsta") was a borg in the village of Wetsinge, Groningen, Netherlands. The borg was built around 1500 by the family Onsta (also known as Onseda, Onsitha or Onsatha). The Onsta family belonged to one of the oldest and most prominent families of the Ommelanden. The Onsta family also owned an Onstaborg in Sauwerd. In 1658 the borg was sold and refurbished. In 1801 the borg was demolished. There is no trace left of the borg or its grounds.

== See also ==
- Borg (castle)
- Onstaborg (Sauwerd)
