= Uithuizermeeden =

- Village
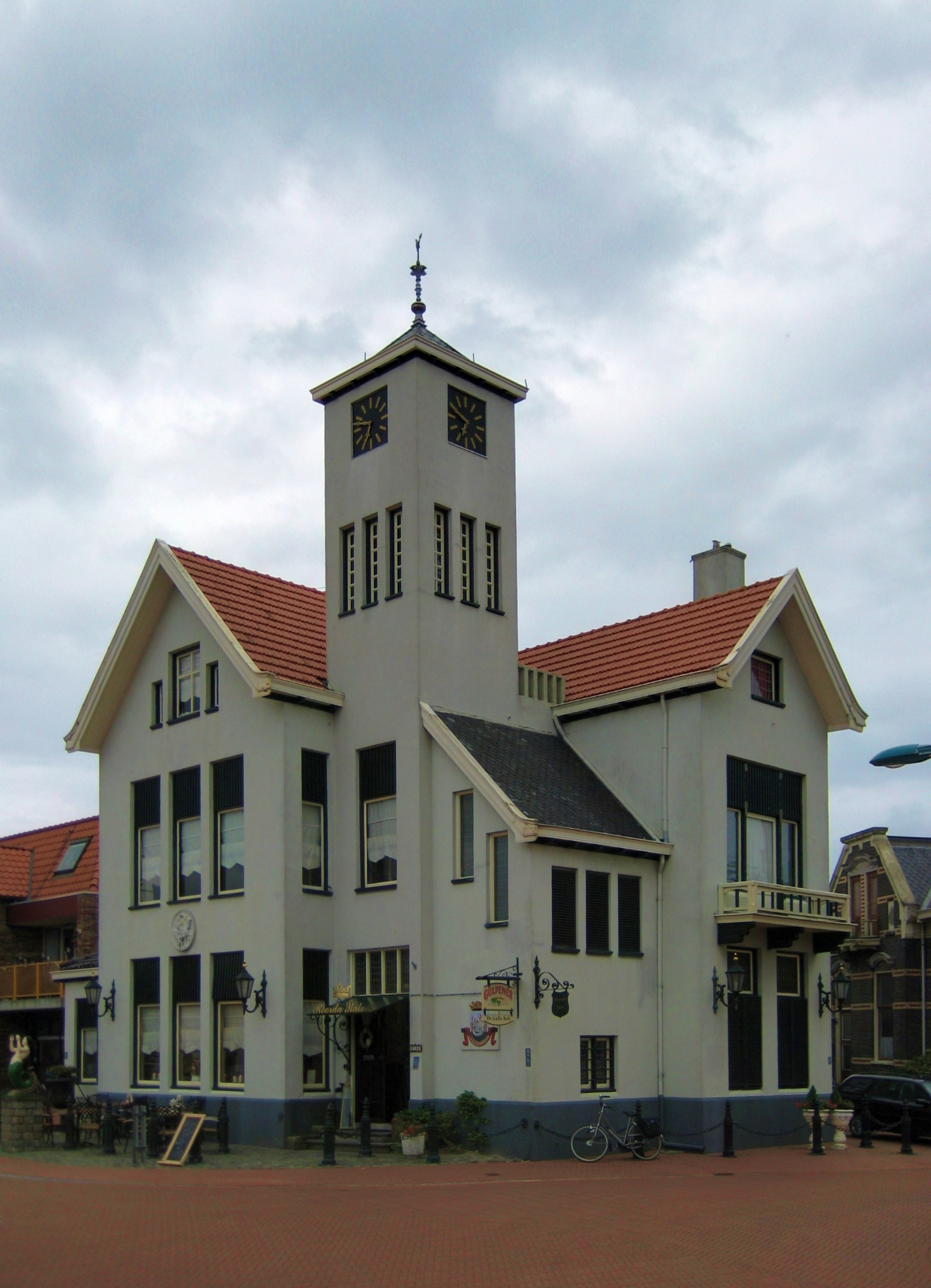
- Former Town Hall

- Flag Coat of arms

- Location of Uithuizermeeden in the province of Groningen Uithuizermeeden (Netherlands)
- Coordinates: 53°24′52″N 6°43′35″E
- Country: Netherlands
- Province: Groningen
- Municipality: Het Hogeland

Area
  - Total: 47.94 km^{2} (18.51 sq mi)
- Elevation: 1.2 m (3.9 ft)

Population (2021)
  - Total: 3,275
  - Density: 68.31/km^{2} (176.9/sq mi)
- Time zone: UTC+1 (CET)
  - Summer (DST): UTC+2 (CEST)
- Postal code: 9982
- Dialing code: 0595

Uithuizermeeden is a village in the Netherlands, with a population of about 3,200 people. It is part of the municipality of Het Hogeland, close to the Wadden Sea.

The most important points are the Meijster Toren and the Rensumaborg (dated 1700, not open for public). The Meijster Toren dated from the thirteenth century, but was rebuilt at the end of the 19th century in original style, after a fire destroyed it.

It had a population of around 3,325 in January 2017.

Uithuizermeeden was a separate municipality until 1979, when it became part of Hefshuizen.

== Gallery ==
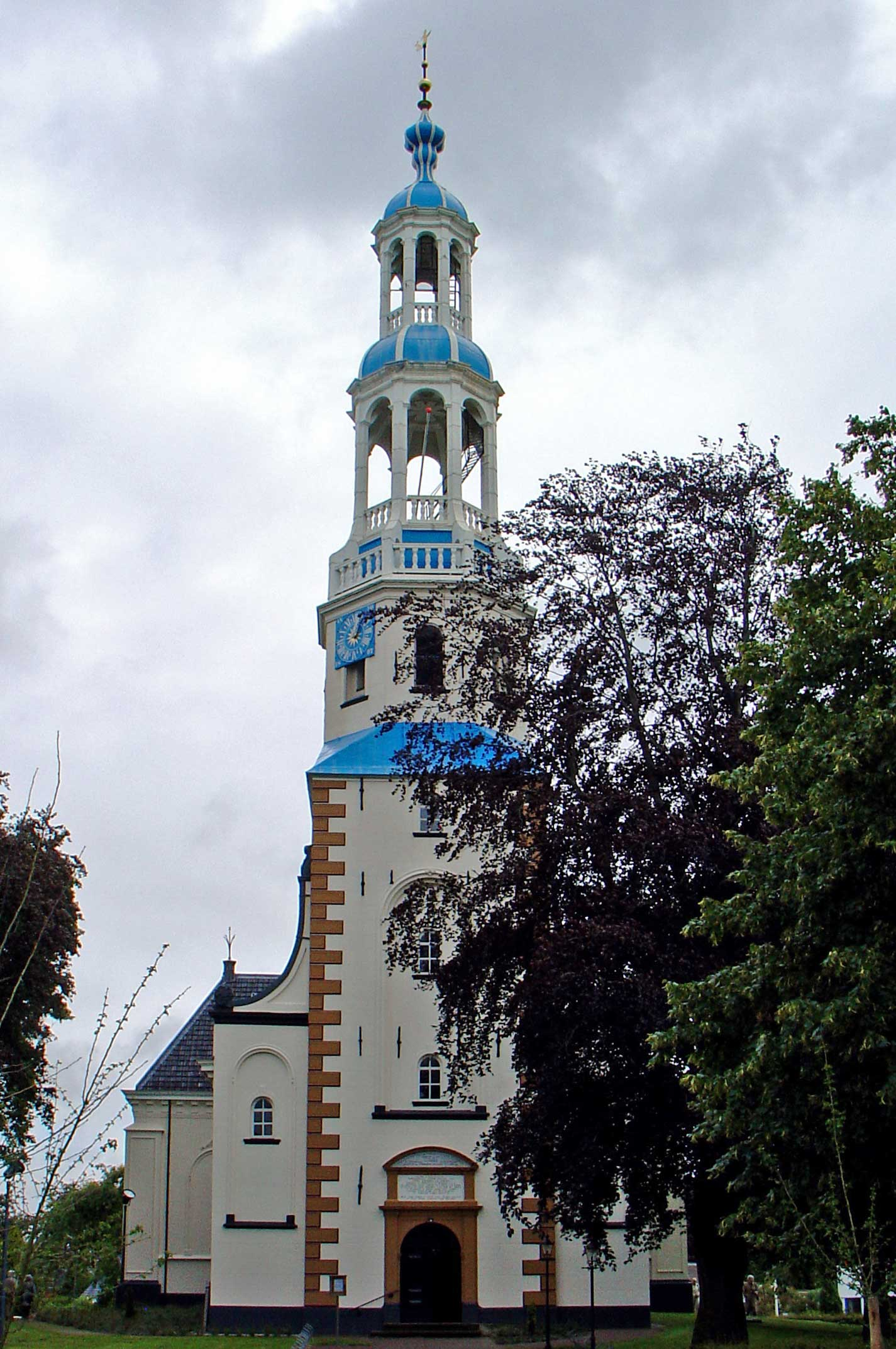
Church of Uithuizermeeden.

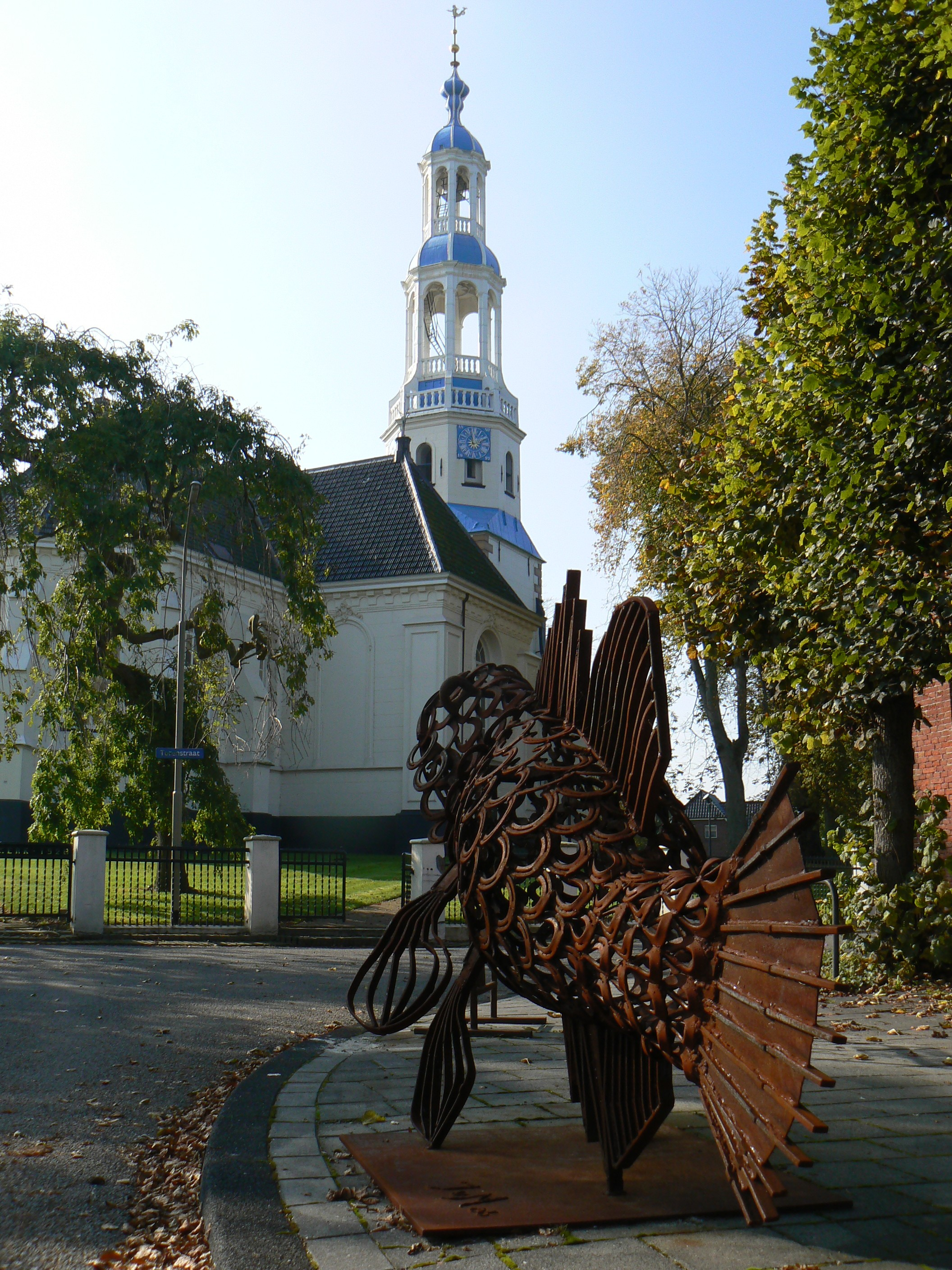
Church and sculpture Fish by Jaap Meeuwen

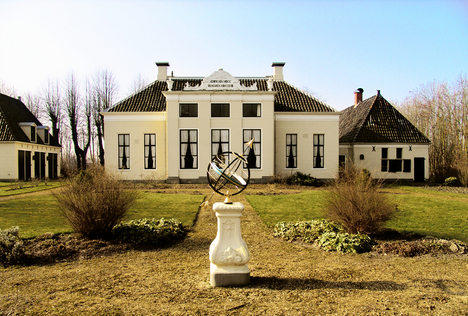
Rensumaborg, ca. 1500; front
