= Wirdum, Groningen =

Wirdum
- Village
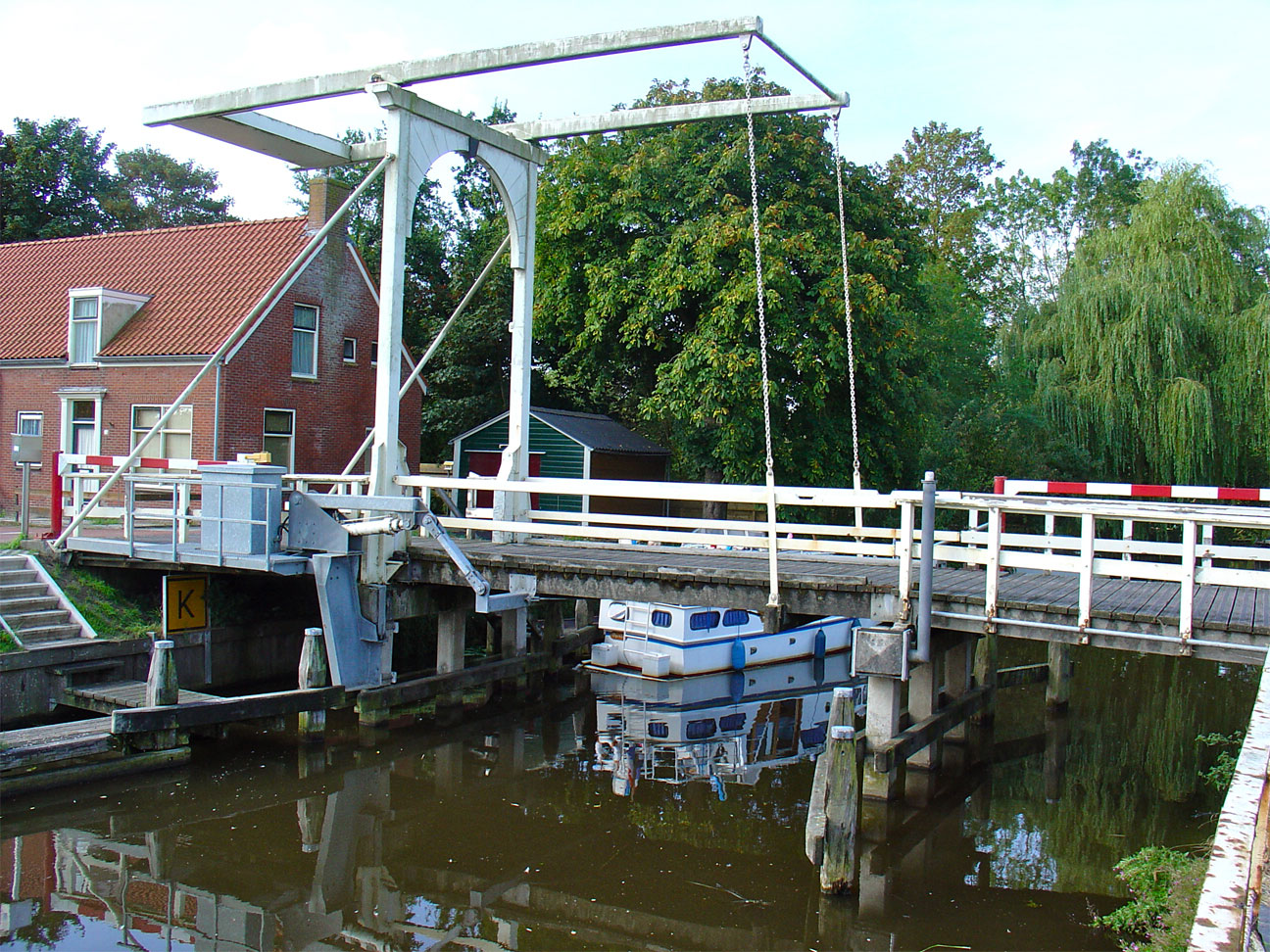
- The Wirdumerklap bridge across the Damsterdiep

- Flag

- Location in the province of Groningen in the Netherlands Wirdum (Netherlands)
- Coordinates: 53°19′N 6°47′E
- Country: Netherlands
- Province: Groningen
- Municipality: Eemsdelta

Area
  - Total: 0.36 km^{2} (0.14 sq mi)
- Elevation: 1.0 m (3.3 ft)

Population (2021)
  - Total: 365
  - Density: 1,000/km^{2} (2,600/sq mi)
- Time zone: UTC+1 (CET)
  - Summer (DST): UTC+2 (CEST)
- Postal code: 9917
- Dialing code: 0596

Wirdum (Dutch: [ˈʋɪrdʏm], Gronings: [ˈʋɪɾəm]) is a village in the province of Groningen in the Netherlands. It is situated close to the Damsterdiep – a channel connecting the city of Groningen to Delfzijl – on two artificial dwelling hills, known locally as 'Wierden'. As of 2021, Wirdum had a population of 365.

== Church ==
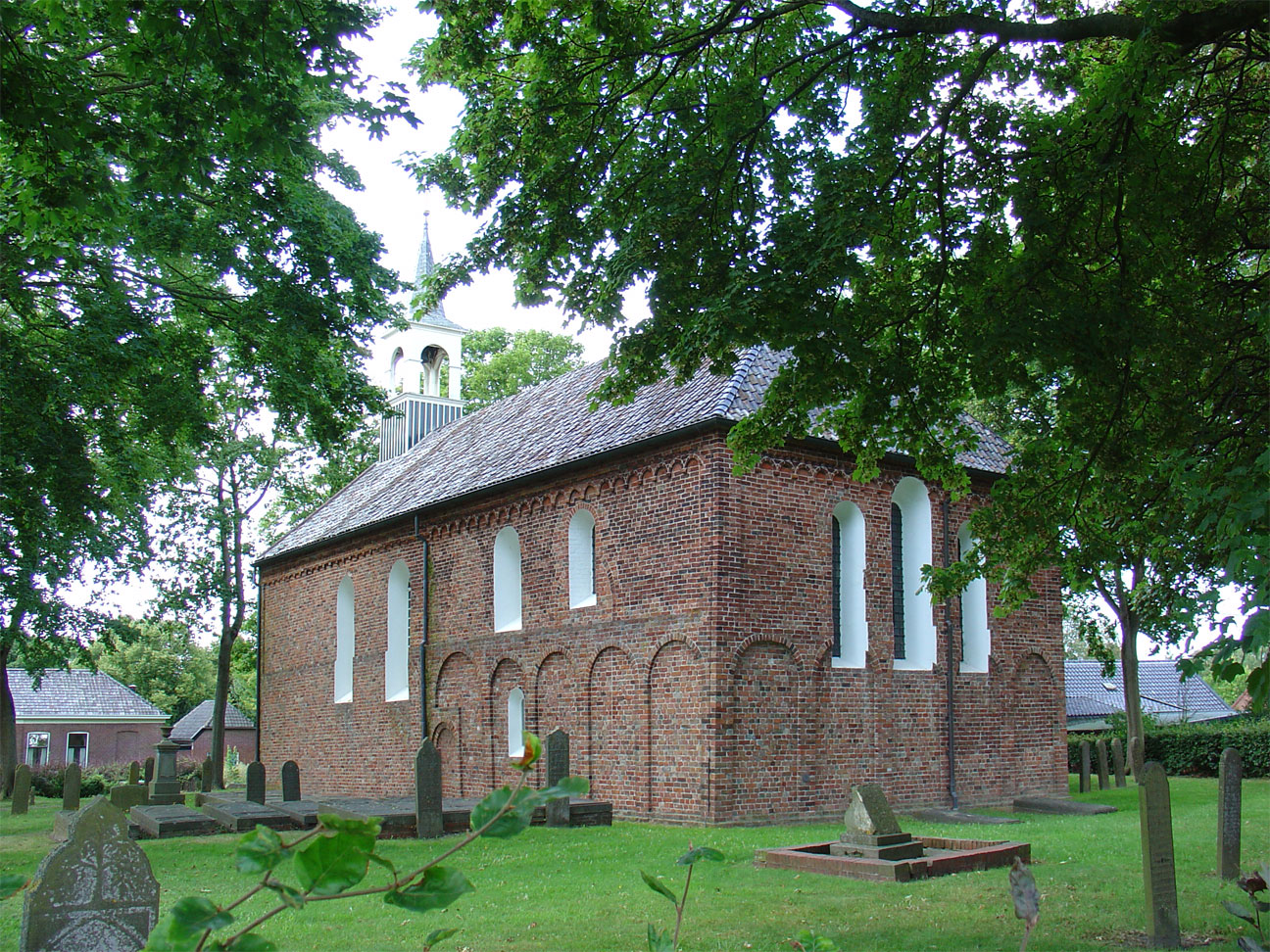
The Wirdum church, dating back to the 13th century

Like almost every village in Groningen, Wirdum, too, has a historical church around which the village is centred. The church was originally built in the 13th century, although it has gone through some changes such as the removal of the church tower in favour of a Flèche in 1878.

== Damsterdiep ==
The Damsterdiep is a channel connecting the city of Groningen to the coastal town of Delfzijl, allowing access to the Dutch most eastern part of the Wadden Sea, the Eems. Historically the channel can be divided into two parts at the village of Ten Post, approximately 5 km south-west of Wirdum. The oldest north-eastern part was constructed before the year 1000 and was directly connected to the sea up until the 14th century. Because of this the course of the channel was affected by tidal changes resulting in a somewhat meandering layout. The south-western part of the channel, having been constructed much later, was not exposed to such influences allowing it to maintain its original straight course. Until the construction of the far wider and deeper Eems Canal in the 19th century, the Damsterdiep was an important trade route.

== Rusthoven and Ekenstein ==
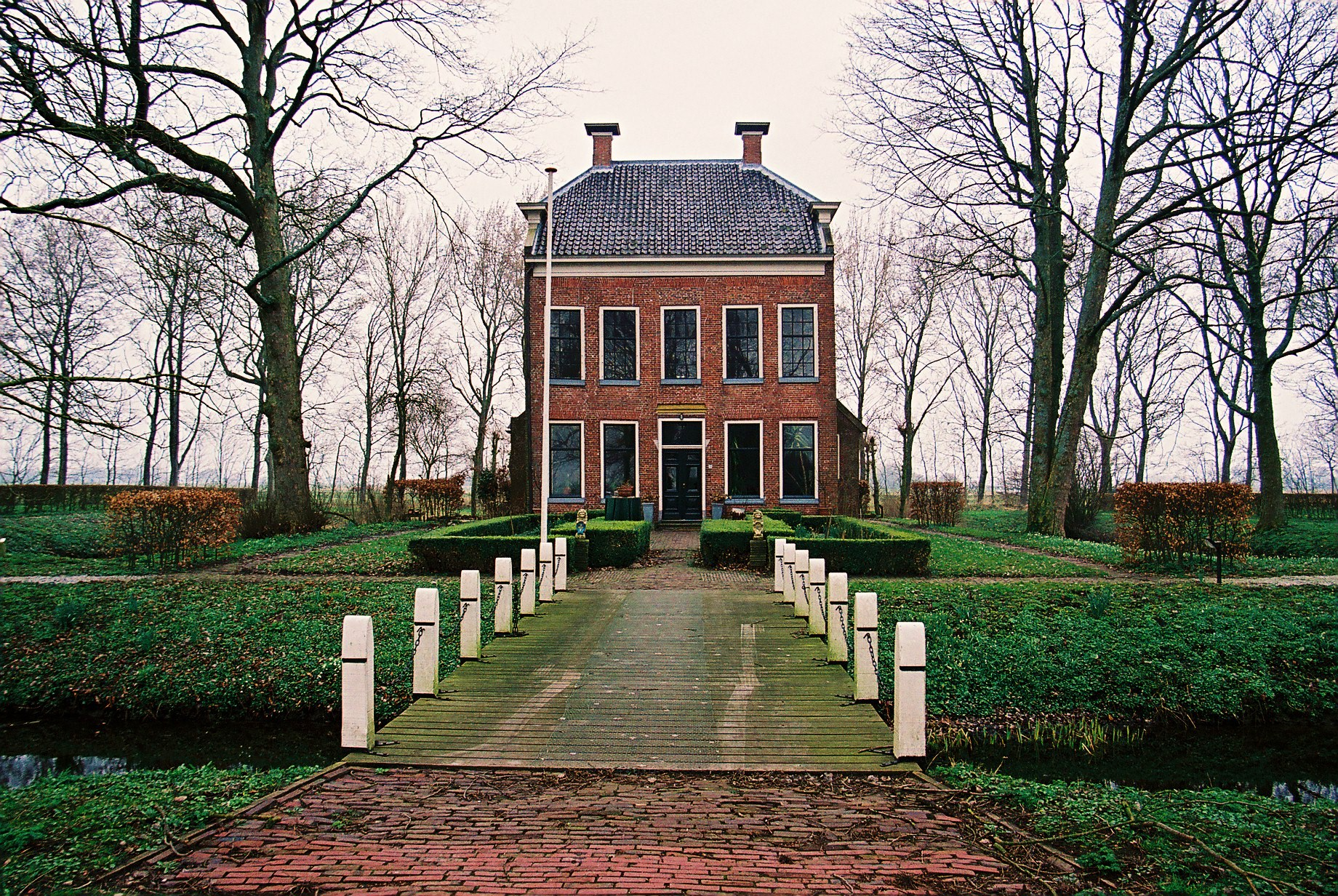
Borg Rusthoven, built in 1686

Between Appingedam and Wirdum lie the bordering estates of Rusthoven and Ekenstein, the latter of which currently belongs to the municipality of Appingedam. Both of the estates are characterised by a manor-like building known as a Borg (castle), built in 1648 (Ekenstein) and 1686 (Rusthoven). The estates, lying next to the Damsterdiep, offered easy trade access and a large brickyard was built in the early 19th century, the ruins of which - including an iconic 30-metre chimney - still stand. Although the 'Borgen' are privately owned, the interconnected estate is open to the public as a park.
