= Onstaborg (Sauwerd) =

- Sauwerd, Netherlands
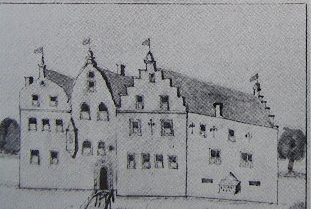
- Onstaborg

Site information
- Type: Borg

Location
- Location in Groningen in the Netherlands
- Coordinates: 53.2949°N 6.5312°E

Site history
- Built: Was known to exist as early as 1325
- Demolished: 1725

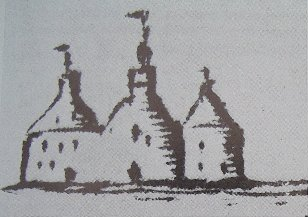
Drawing of the borg from the 17th century

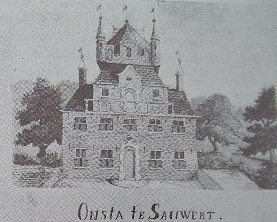
19th century drawing of Onstaborg

Onstaborg was a borg in the northeast Netherlands. It was located in Sauwerd, Groningen. The borg was founded in or before 1325 by the family Onsta (also known as Onseda, Onsitha or Onsatha). The Onsta family belonged to one of the oldest and most prominent families of the Ommelanden. The Onsta family also owned an Onstaborg in Wetsinge.

== See also ==
- List of castles in the Netherlands
- Onstaborg (Wetsinge)
