= Uithuizen =

- Village
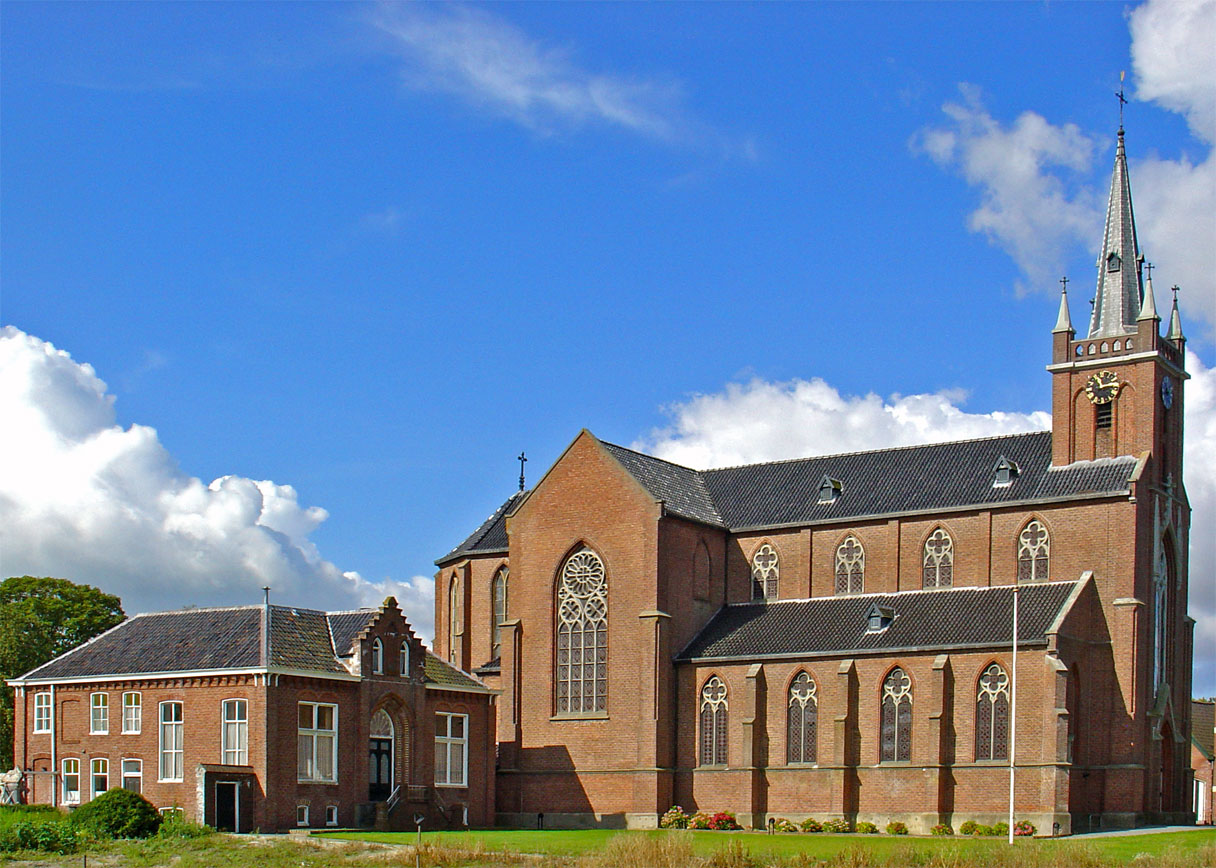
- James the Greater Church in 2009

- Flag Coat of arms

- Location of Uithuizen in the province of Groningen Uithuizen (Netherlands)
- Coordinates: 53°24′24″N 6°40′40″E
- Country: Netherlands
- Province: Groningen
- Municipality: Het Hogeland

Area
  - Total: 33.1 km^{2} (12.8 sq mi)
- Elevation: 2 m (6.6 ft)

Population (2021)
  - Total: 5.470
  - Density: 166/km^{2} (430/sq mi)
- Time zone: UTC+1 (CET)
  - Summer (DST): UTC+2 (CEST)
- Postal code: 9981
- Dialing code: 0595

Uithuizen (Dutch pronunciation: [œytˈɦœyzə(n)]) is a village in the Dutch province of Groningen. It is located in the municipality of Het Hogeland. It had a population of 4,885 in January 2017.

The Uithuizen railway station is located on the Sauwerd–Roodeschool railway.

== History ==
Uithuizen was first mentioned in 1000 as Uthuson (extreme houses). It was established by the inhabitants of Oldorp as their furthest edge. Around 1200, a dike was built to protect the village. In the mid-19th century, Uithuizen started to grow substantially.

In the village is a borg called the Menkemaborg. Menkemaborg at Uithuizen is a 14th-century, brick-built country house, which was substantially altered around 1700. Since then it has barely been changed. The Alberda family, the 18th-century occupants, commissioned artists to decorate the interior with impressive chimney-pieces carved with baroque ornaments, and paintings of mythological scenes. The Menkemaborg and its gardens are open to the public.

Uithuizen was a separate municipality until 1979, when it became part of Hefshuizen.

In 2000 a new sports centre was built on the site of the former station building at Uithuizen railway station.

On 17 May 2008, Cardinal Simonis opened the Trail of St James, connecting Uithuizen to Hasselt, Le Puy en Velay, and Santiago de Compostela, creating a modern, northern branch of the Way of St James.

Uithuizen hosted the finish of stage 4 at the 2013 Energiewacht Tour.

== Economy ==
The Uithuizen Gas Plant processes natural gas to the north of the village, on the Dutch coast.

== Notable people ==
- Seth Gaaikema (1939–2014), cabaret artist and writer
- Frederik Engel Jeltsema (1879–1971), painter and sculptor
- Frits Peutz (1896–1974), architect

== Gallery ==
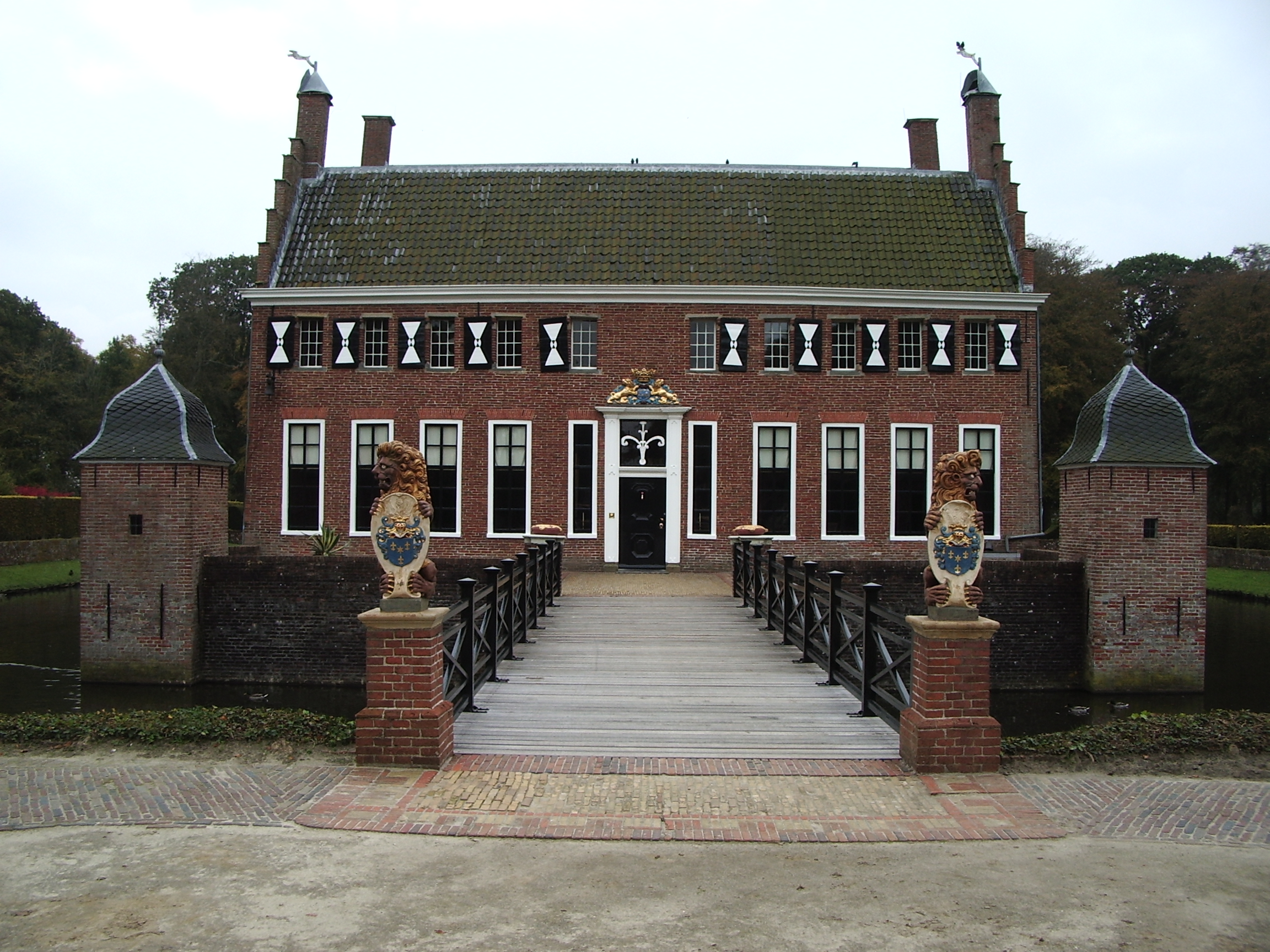
Menkemaborg

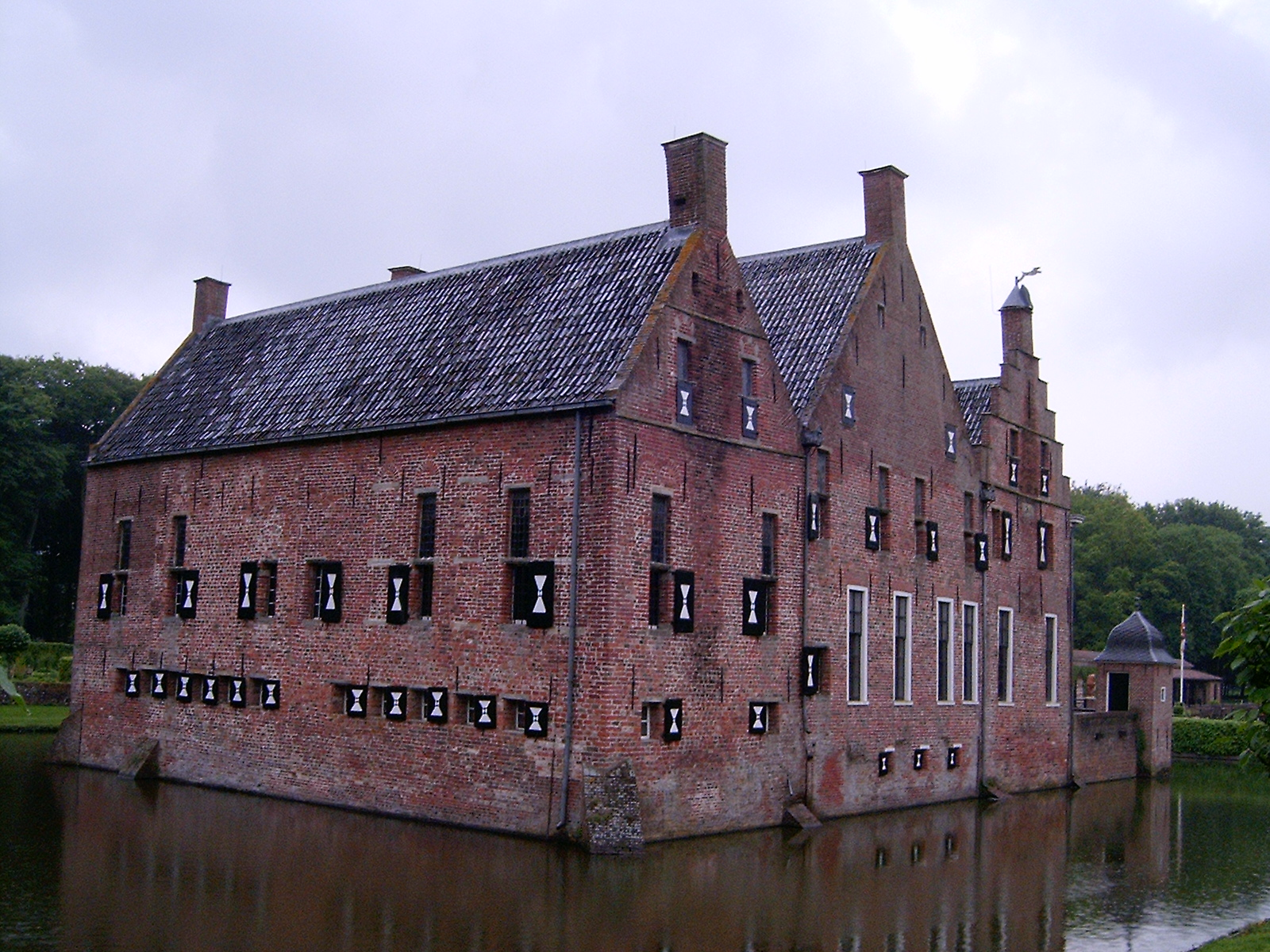
Menkemaborg

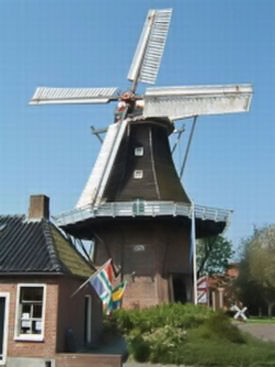
Windmill De liefde (eng: the love) (1866)
