= Sauwerd =

- Village
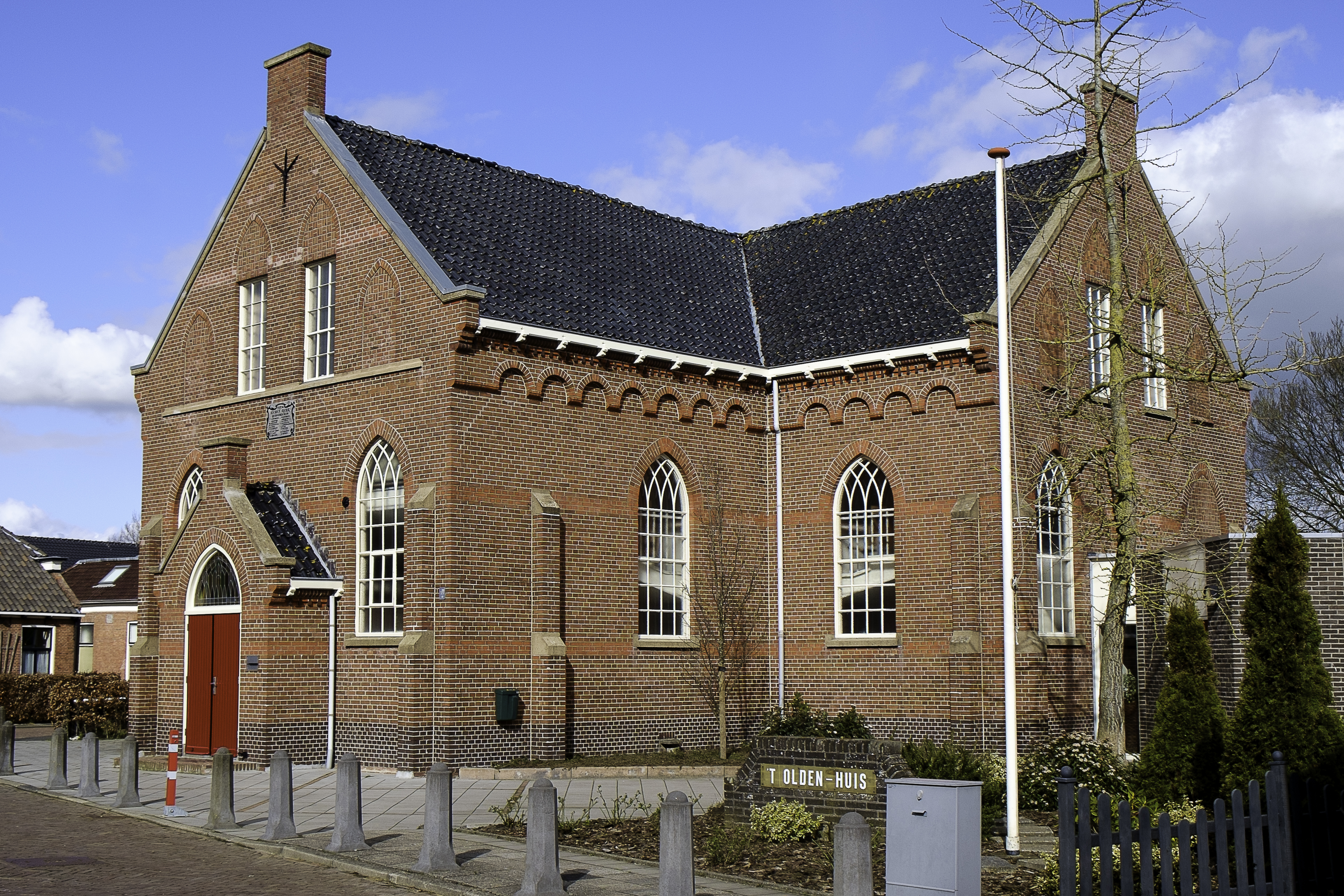
- Reformed church in Sauwerd

- Location of Sauwerd in Groningen in the Netherlands Sauwerd (Netherlands)
- Coordinates: 53°17′36″N 6°32′5″E
- Country: Netherlands
- Province: Groningen
- Municipality: Het Hogeland

Area
  - Total: 0.33 km^{2} (0.13 sq mi)
- Elevation: 0.6 m (2.0 ft)

Population (2021)
  - Total: 985
  - Density: 3,000/km^{2} (7,700/sq mi)
- Time zone: UTC+1 (CET)
  - Summer (DST): UTC+2 (CEST)
- Postal code: 9771
- Dialing code: 050

Sauwerd is a village in the municipality of Het Hogeland, Groningen, Netherlands. Until the local government reorganization of 1990 the village was the head of the former municipality of Adorp.

The village of Sauwerd is 7 to 10 kilometers away from the nearest city, Groningen. The village is built on a wierde, from which it gets the second part of its name. It is inhabited by an estimated 1,100 people. The internationally known swimmer Ranomi Kromowidjojo was born in Sauwerd and lived there for most of her youth.

== Facilities ==
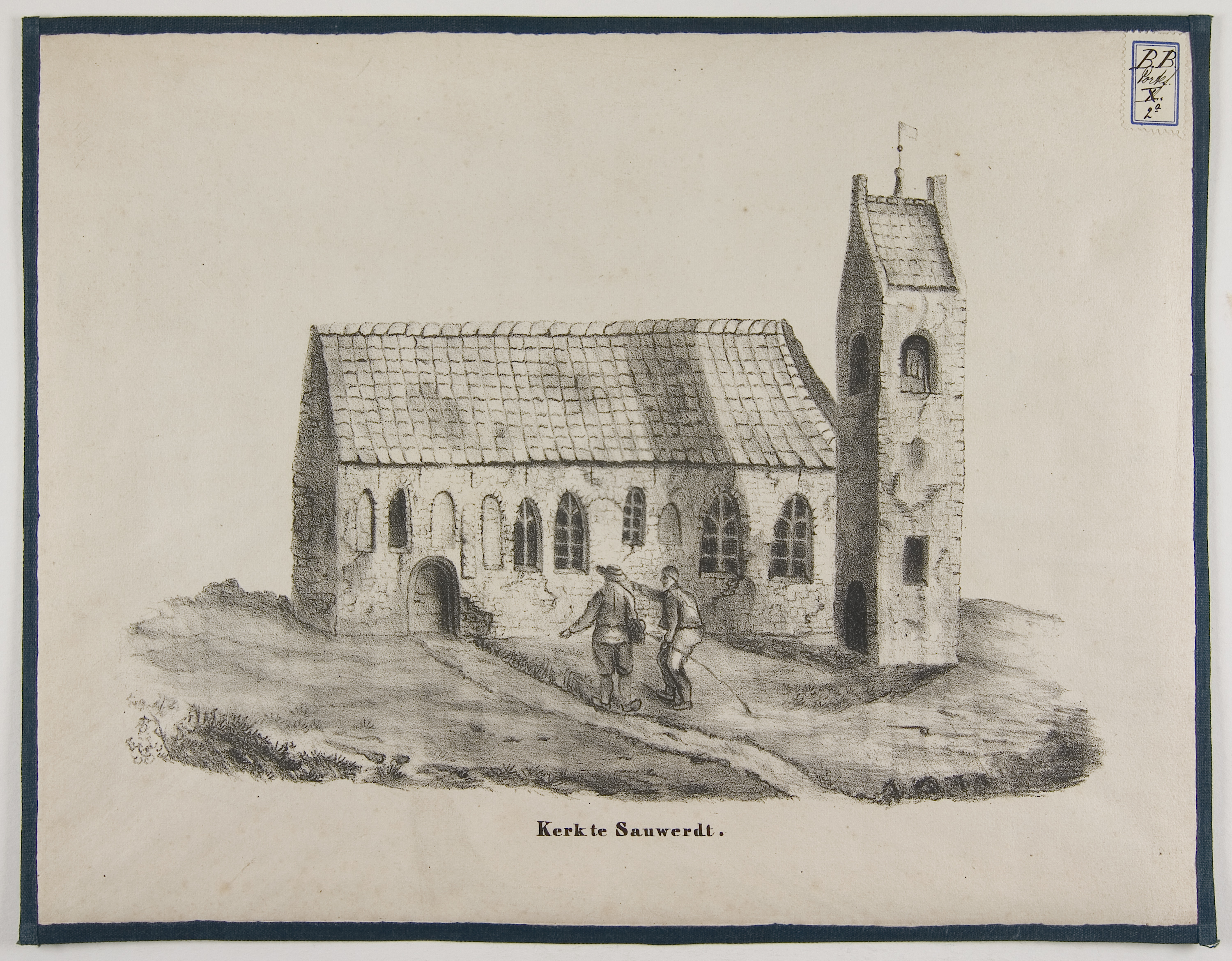
Old church in Sauwerd, shortly before it was razed

There is one primary school in Sauwerd, called De Meander (the meander). There is one cooperative grocery store. Sauwerd has a sports complex called De Lange Twee (meaning The Long Two). The park features a football club called VV SIOS with two football fields. There is also a tennis club in the complex called TV Onstaborg.

There are two churches in Sauwerd. One is a Reformed church and the other is a PKN church. Until 1840 there was a medieval church building in the village. This was demolished in that year due to dilapidation. Simultaneously, the medieval church in Groot Wetsinge was demolished. A new church was built halfway between both villages, in Klein-Wetsinge.

Sauwerd has its own train station located on the Groningen-Delfzijl and Groningen-Roodeschool line. These lines form the eastern border of the village. In 2003 track doubling was completed between Groningen Noord railway station and Sauwerd. Until that time the line was one of the busiest pieces of single track in the Netherlands. On 25 July 1980 two passenger trains collided in neighbouring Winsum, with 9 deaths and 21 injuries. There is a bus stop in Sauwerd and a train station.

== Gallery ==
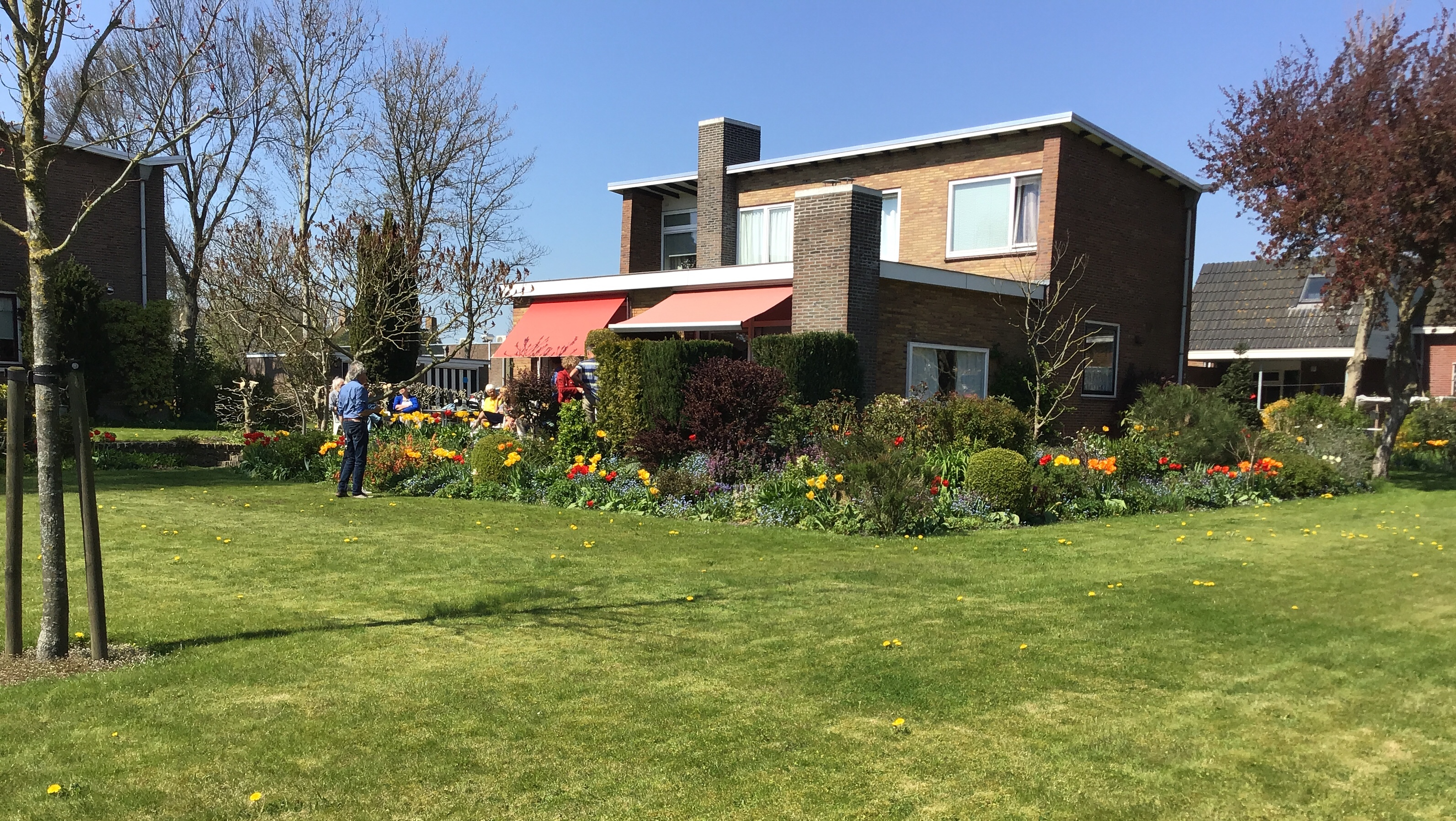
House in Sauwerd

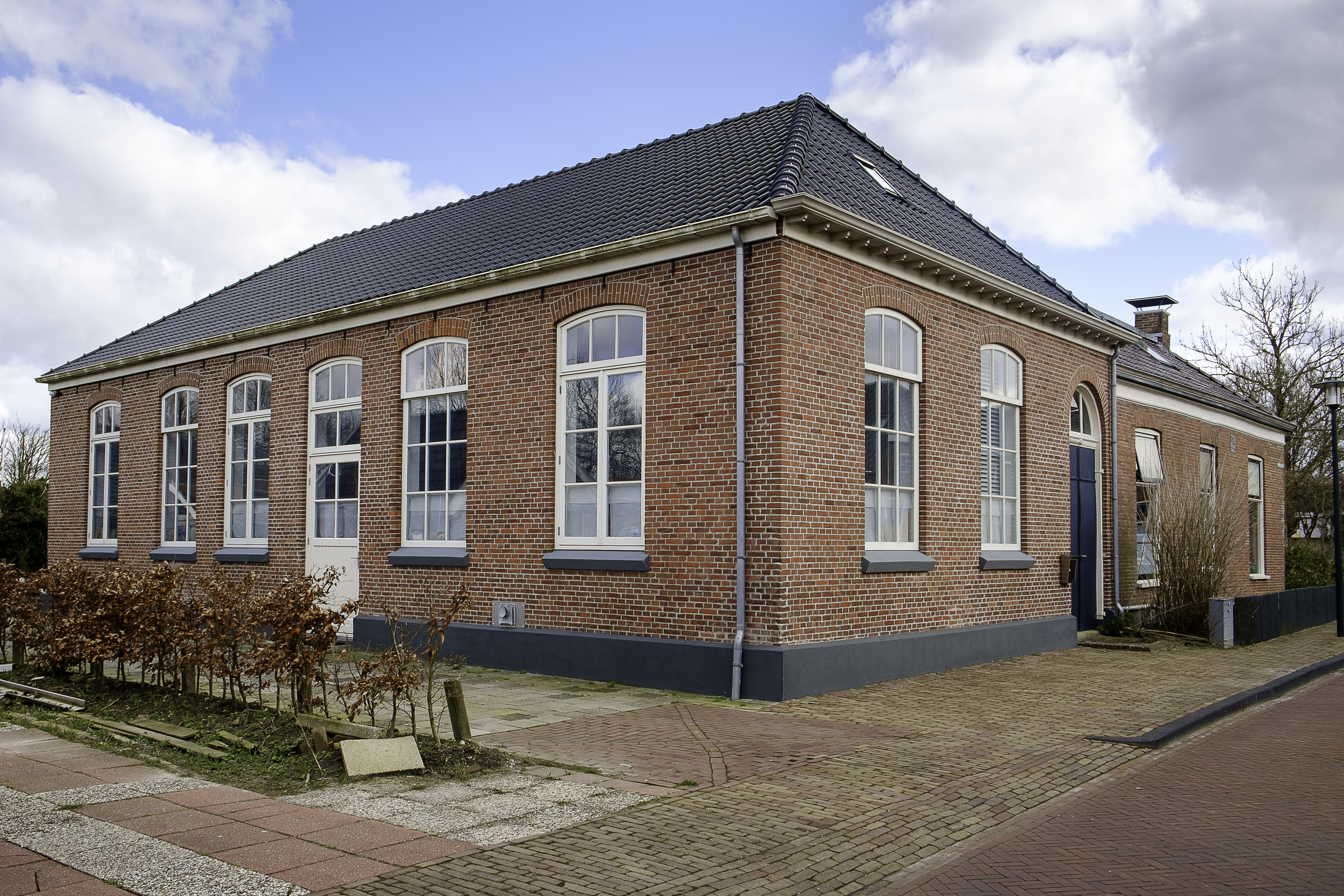
School in Sauwerd

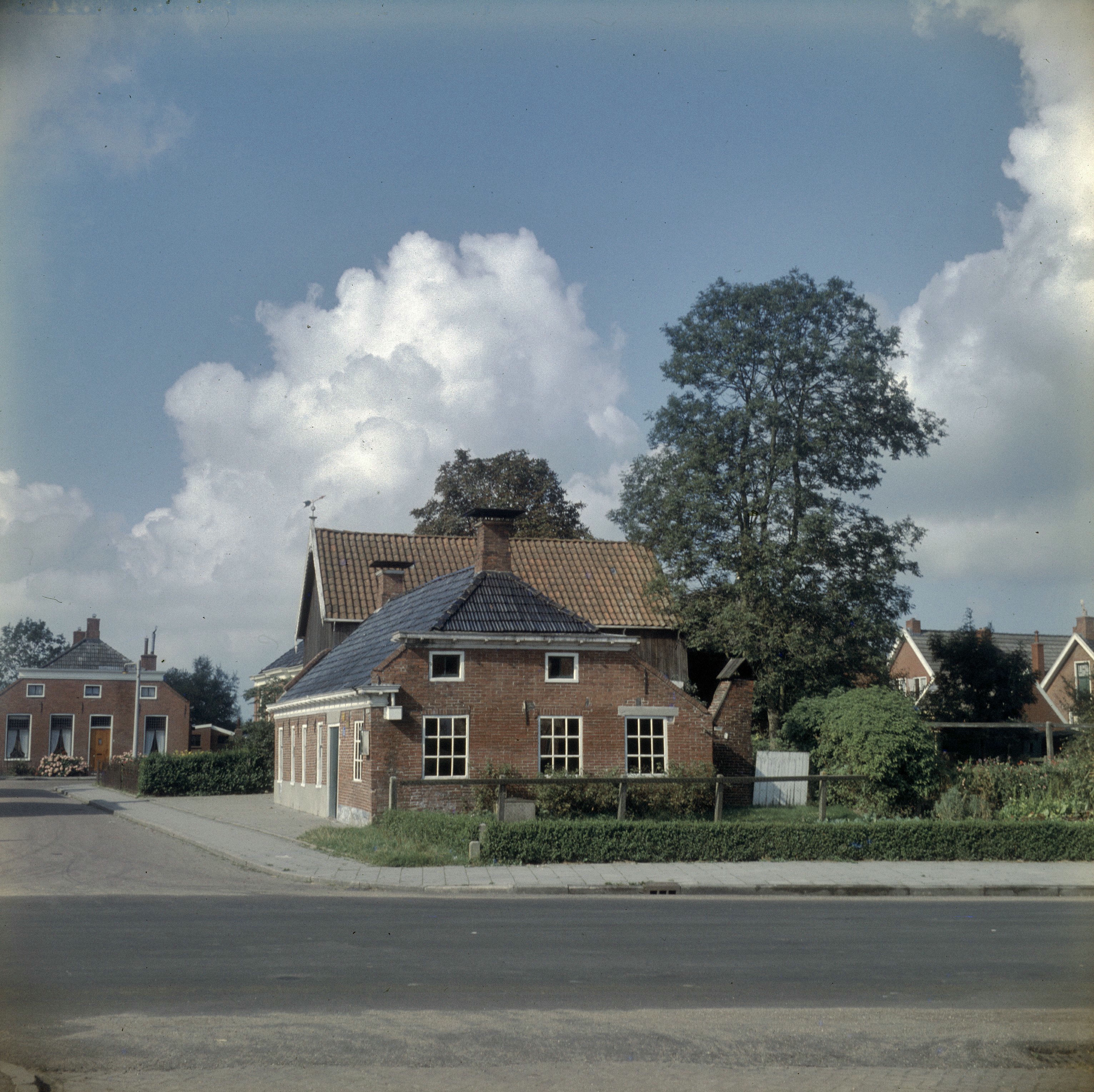
Former wheelwright

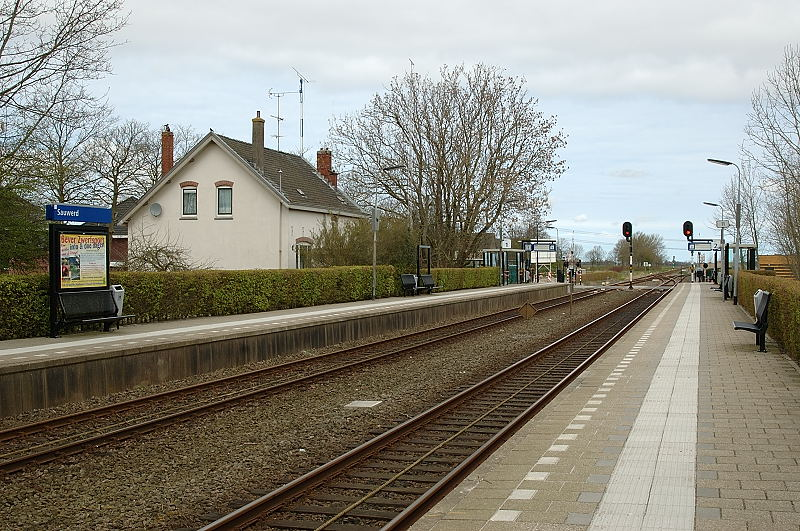
Sauwerd railway station

== See also ==
- Onstaborg (Sauwerd)
