= Wetsinge =

- Village
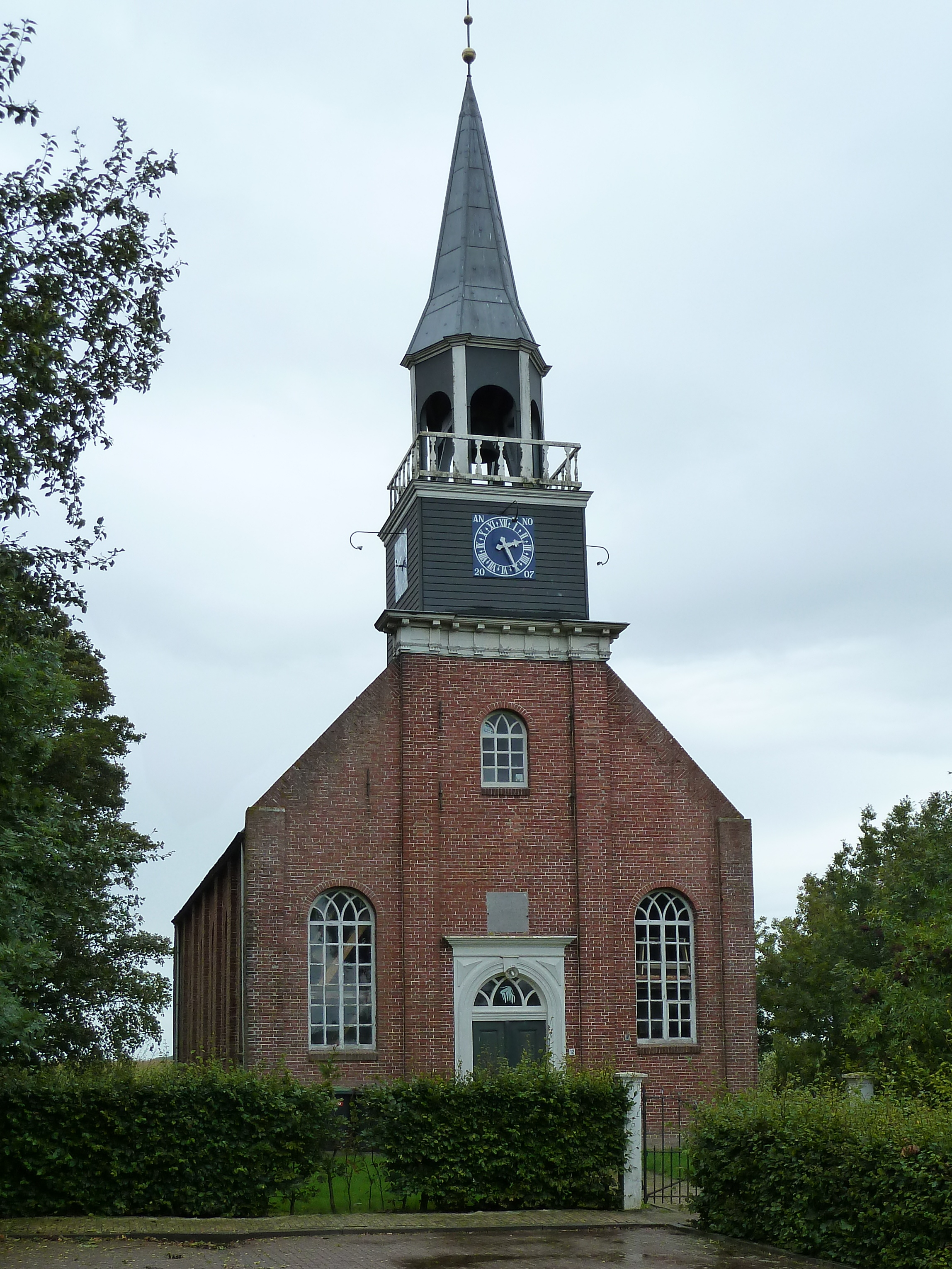
- The church of Wetsinge

- Location of Wetsinge in the province of Groningen Wetsinge (Netherlands)
- Coordinates: 53°18′2″N 6°31′50″E
- Country: Netherlands
- Province: Groningen
- Municipality: Het Hogeland

Area
  - Total: 0.10 km^{2} (0.039 sq mi)
- Elevation: 0.7 m (2.3 ft)

Population (2021)
  - Total: 50
  - Density: 500/km^{2} (1,300/sq mi)
- Time zone: UTC+1 (CET)
  - Summer (DST): UTC+2 (CEST)
- Postal code: 9773
- Dialing code: 050

Groot Wetsinge (English: Big Wetsinge) and Klein Wetsinge (English: Small Wetsinge) are two villages in the municipality of Het Hogeland in the Dutch province of Groningen. The villages are less than half a kilometre apart and are often referred to together as Wetsinge. The closest village, at a distance of less than a kilometre to Wetsinge is Sauwerd.

The name Groot Wetsinge is a rather confusing name, because there are fewer houses in Groot Wetsinge than in Klein Wetsinge. In this context, Groot means high. This is because of the wierde on which the village lies. Klein Wetsinge is not situated on a wierde.

The first occupation of the mound of Groot Wetsinge dates from the 3rd century BC. Several discoveries have been made in the wierde, including an earthen lamp from the first century BC. The wierde is part of a cluster of wierdes along the eastern bank of the Hunze.

Wetsinge was part of the area controlled by the family Onsta, which also built the Onstaborg to the northeast of Wetsinge.

== Church of Wetsinge ==
The aisleless church of Wetsinge was built in the 11th or 12th century BC. The detached gothic clock tower, which appears on the map of Joannes Baptista Regemortes from 1643 or 1644, was probably built in the 13th or 14th century southeast of the church, when more detached church towers were built in Groningen. Shortly after 1645 the tower was demolished. Because the clay was strong enough the tower had no foundation, so that nothing of the tower is left. Between 1616 and 1630, a new tower was built on the west side of the church which replaced the old one. Early 19th century the church fell into disrepair and in 1840 it was, together with the church of Sauwerd, demolished. It was replaced the same year by a church built halfway between Wetsinge and Sauwerd. The site of the new church was then popularly called Klein Wetsinge. This church has a simple neoclassical facade. The pulpit probably came from the former church of Sauwerd. Also the bell, dating from 1609, probably came from Sauwerd.

== Gallery ==
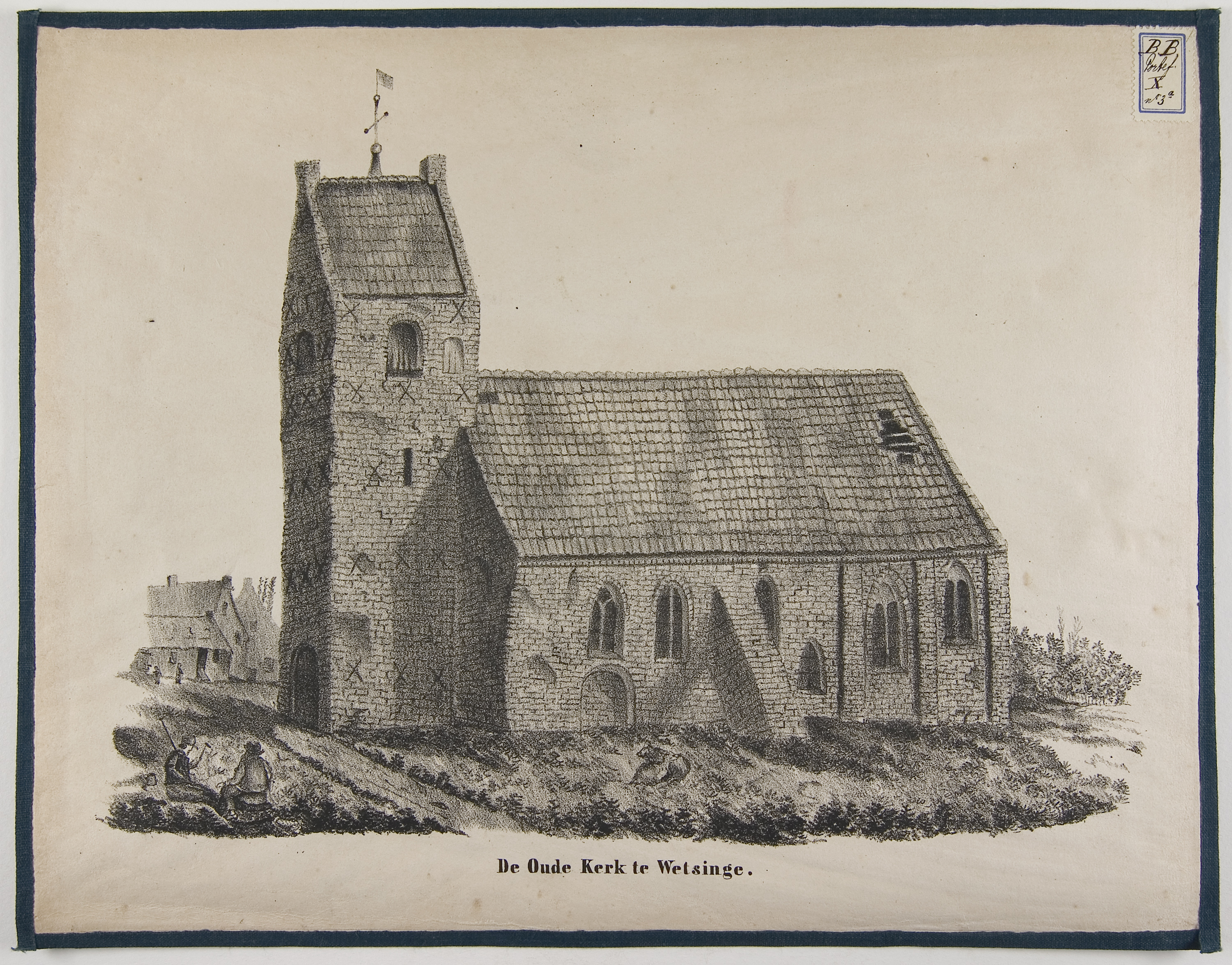
Drawing of the old church which was demolished in 1840

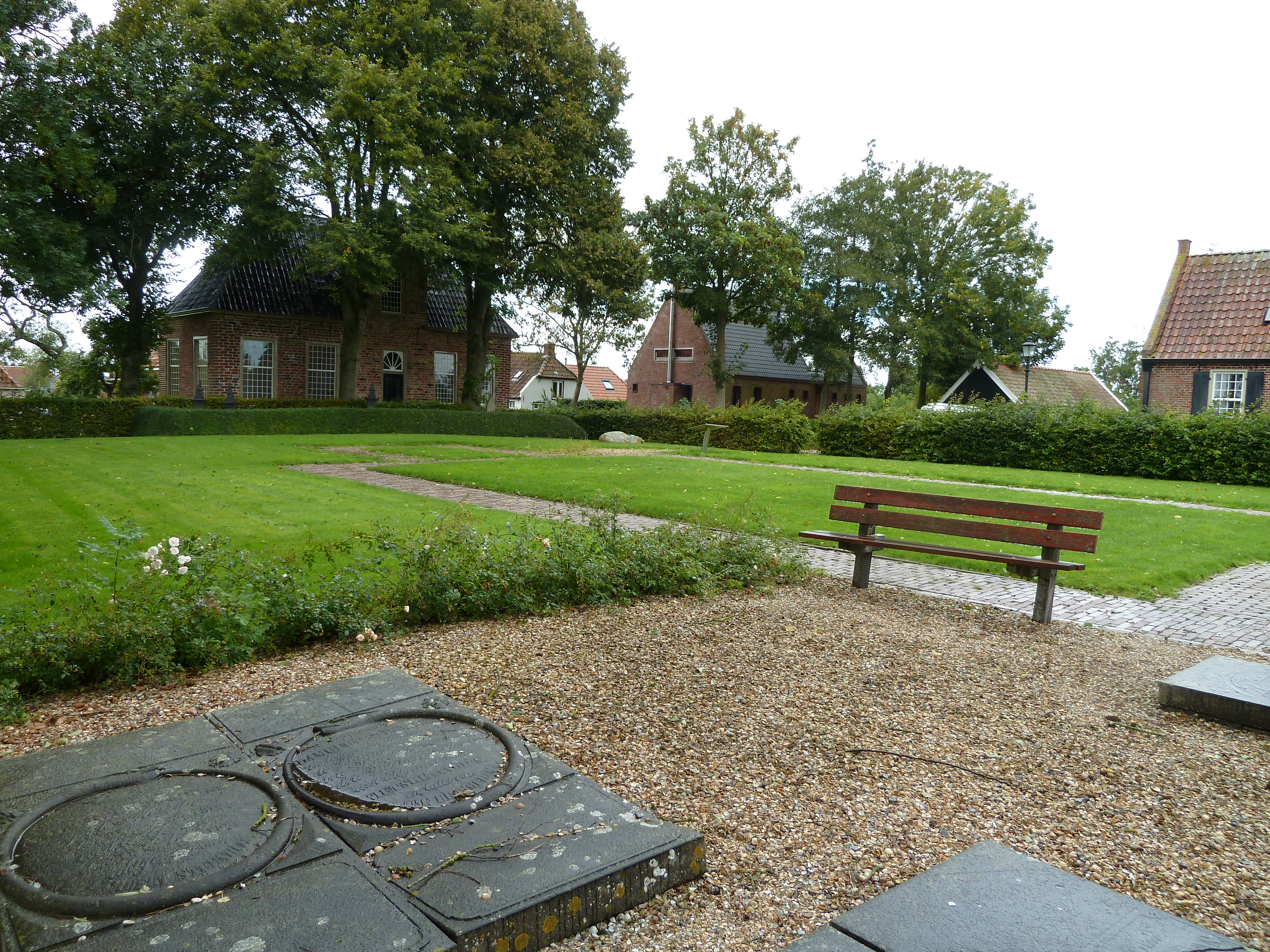
View of the upper side of the mound. In the grass the contours of the former church.

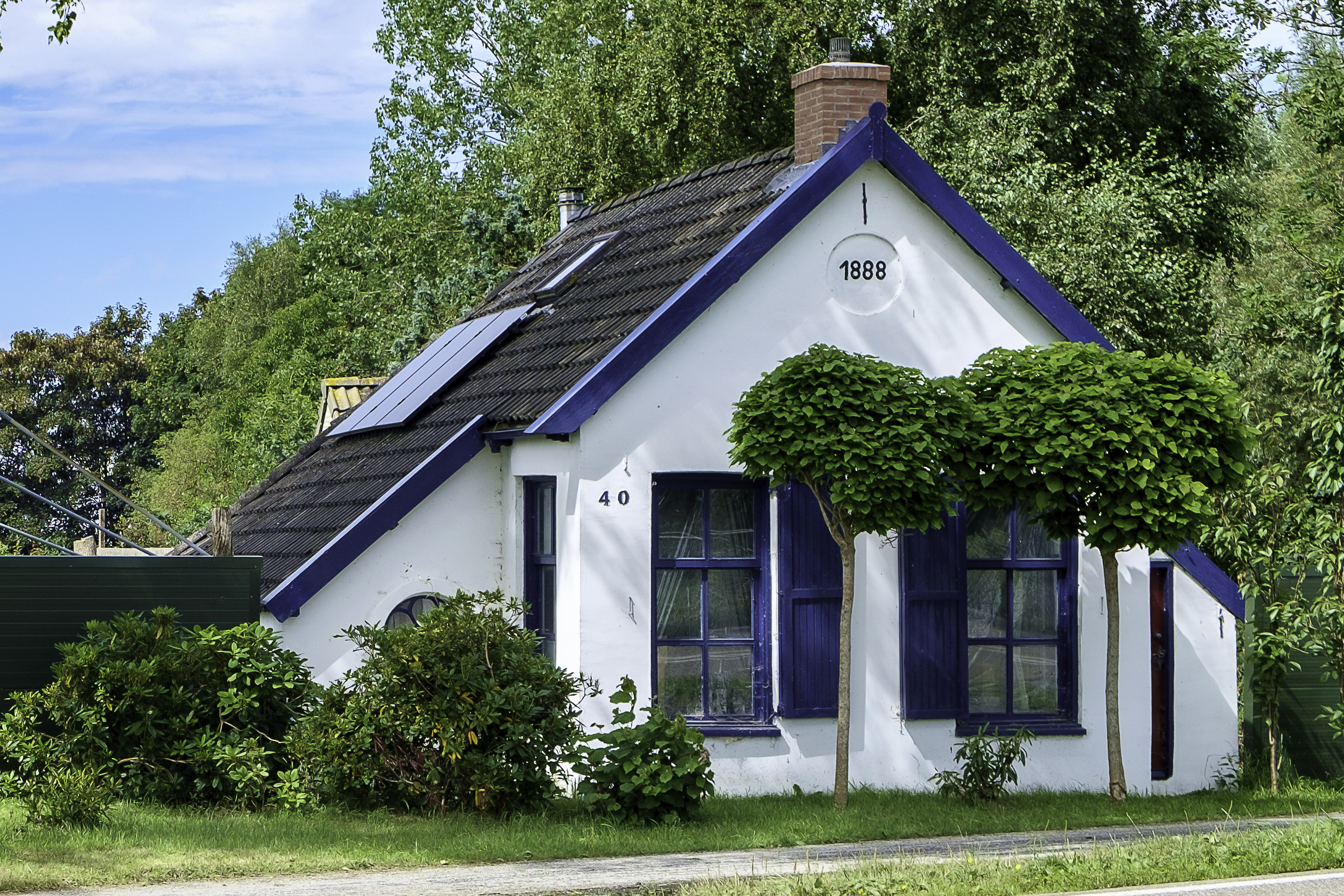
Little house in Wetsinge

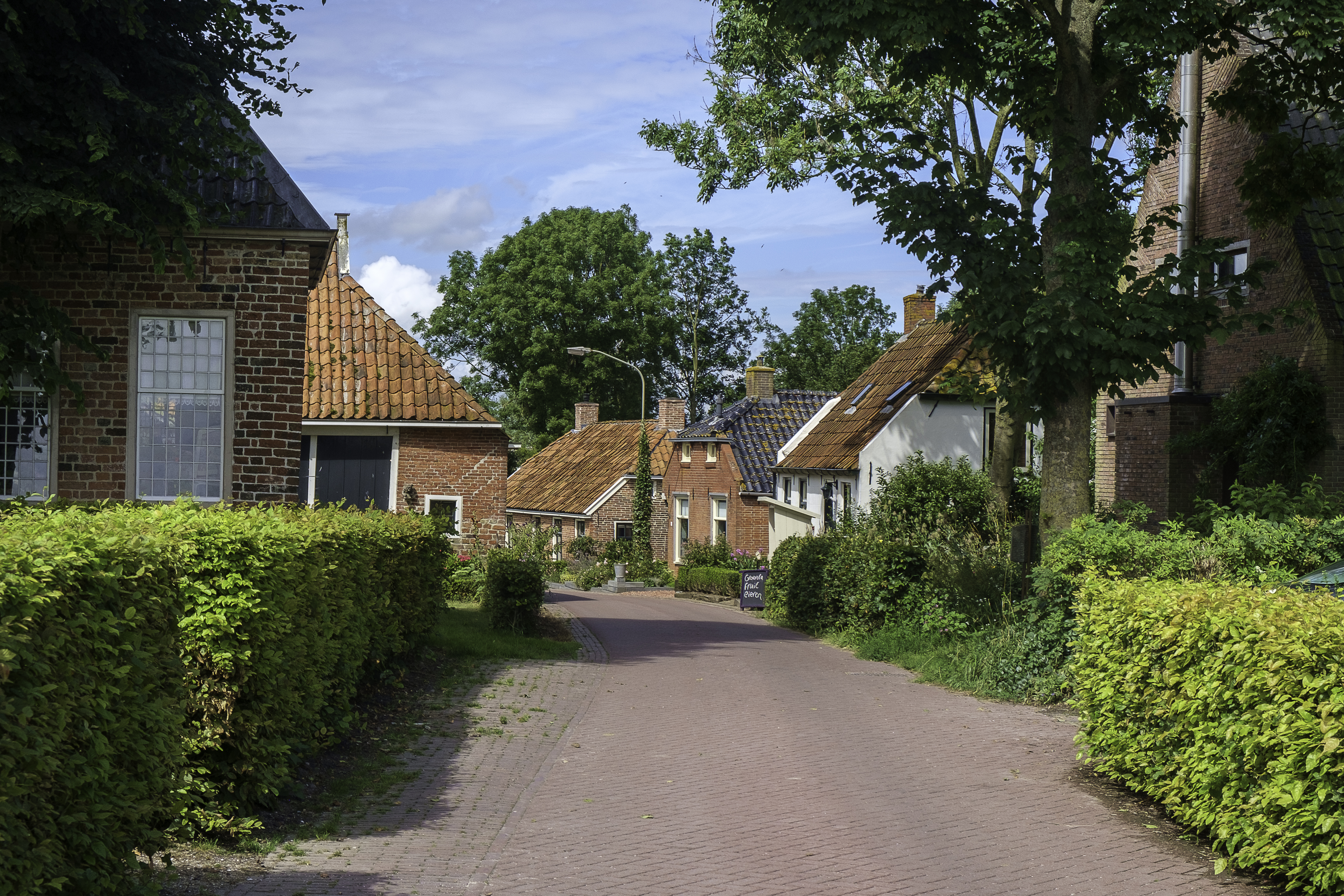
Street view of Groot Wetsinge
