= Borg (castle) =

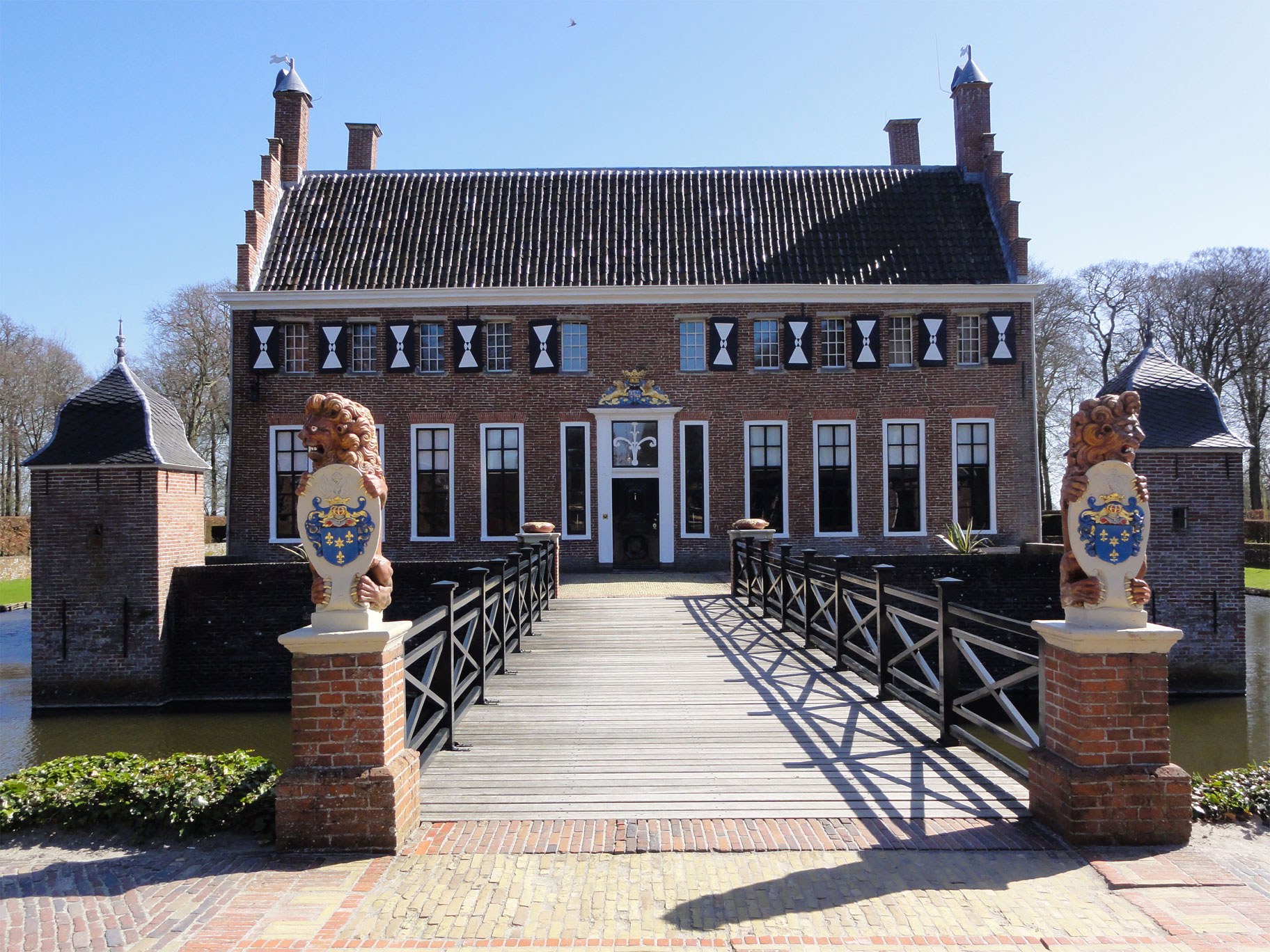
The Menkemaborg in Uithuizen is now a museum

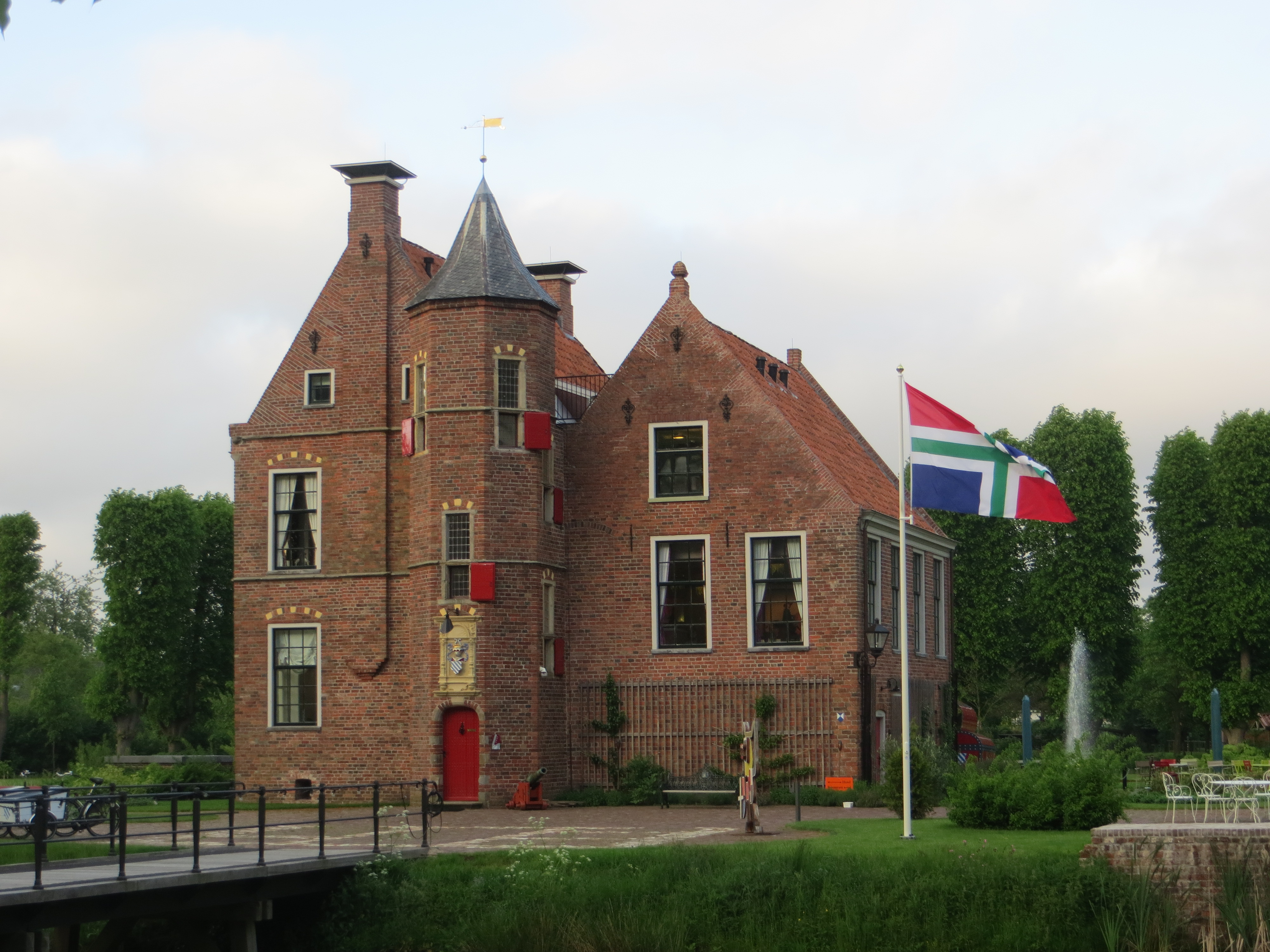
The Wedderborg in Wedde is now a hotel and restaurant

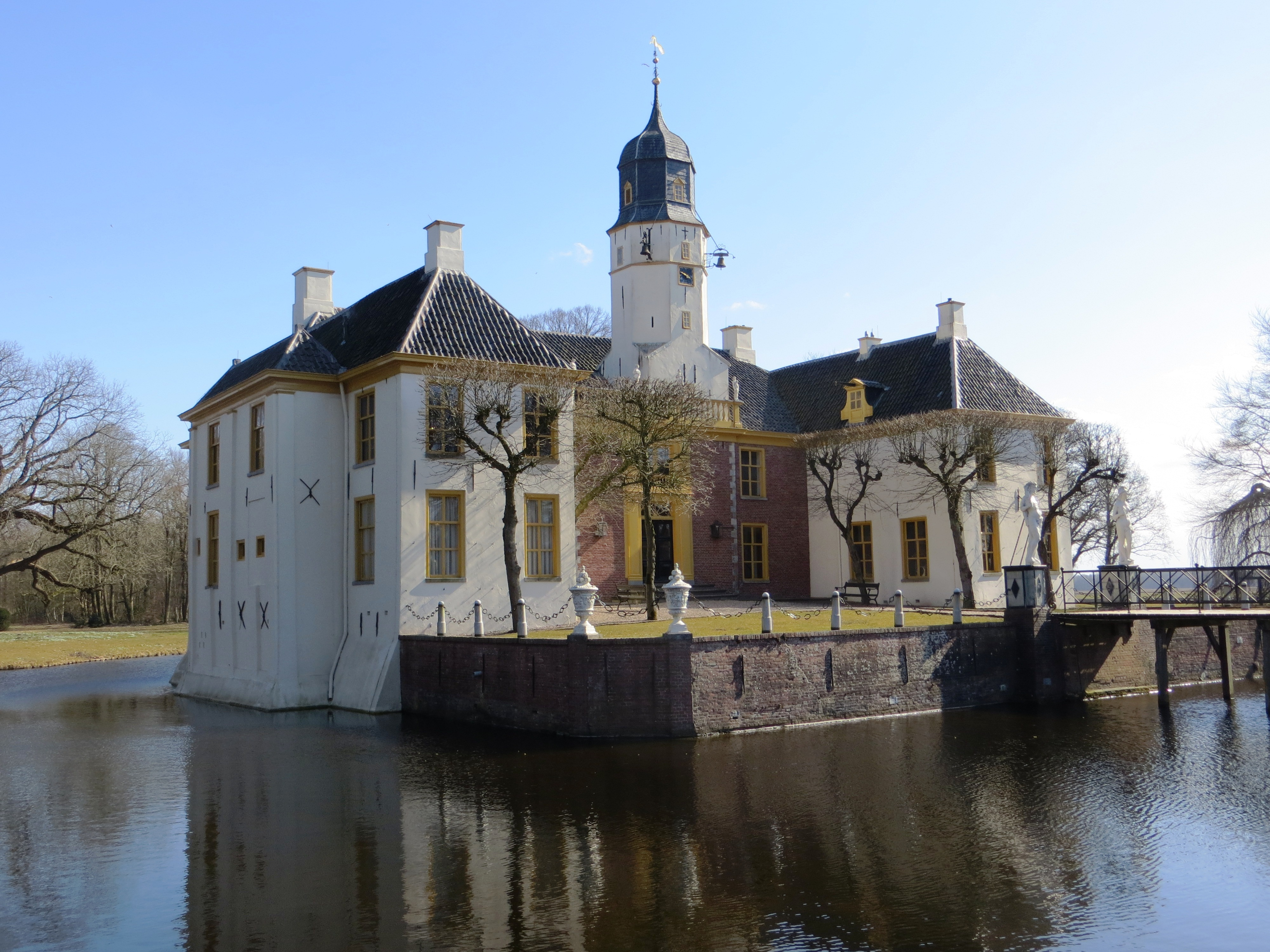
The Fraeylemaborg in Slochteren is now a museum

A borg (Dutch pronunciation: [bɔr(ə)x]; Gronings: börg) is a former stronghold or villa in the province of Groningen, Netherlands. Borgs used to belong to noblemen or prominent citizens. A comparable building in the neighboring province of Friesland is called a stins.

== History ==
A borg usually started as a brick building, a 'steenhuis' (literally meaning 'stone house'), built in the 13th or 14th century. A steenhuis was usually 11 meters long and eight meters wide. The walls were thick, often more than one meter in thickness. Most were originally made of wood because stone was expensive, but less flammable. A steenhuis was not used as a house, but offered protection in times of danger. There is one original steenhuis left in Groningen, the Iwema-steenhuis in Niebert. Some steenhuises were enlarged and became more like a castle; this would be considered a borg. A good example of a borg that originated from a steenhuis is the Fraeylemaborg. In the building itself you can still find a wide wall with embrasures. Many borgs are surrounded by a moat. Besides the borgs that originated from a steenhuis, there are also more recently built borgs that originate from veenborgen.

A veenborg (peat borg) was a mansion built for wealthy people in the Veenkoloniën (peat colonies). These buildings were mostly built in the second half of the 17th century. Examples of veenborgs are Welgelegen in Hoogezand and the Ennemaborg in Midwolda.

== Remains ==
Most borgs were demolished in the 19th century, when maintenance became too expensive. Several surviving borgs are now used as museums.

== See also ==
- List of borgs in Groningen (province)
- List of castles in the Netherlands
