= Engel Modderman =

Dutch communist politician

Member of the municipal council of Oldambt
- In office 2010–2026

Member of the municipal council of Scheemda
- In office 1990–2009

Member of the municipal council of Midwolda
- In office 1982–1989

Personal details
- Born: 1 October 1951 (age 75) Winschoten, Netherlands
- Party: VCP
- Other political affiliations: CPN (1970–1991); NCPN (1992–1999)
- Spouse: Greetje Modderman-Mulder (m. 1970)
- Children: 1

Engel Modderman (born 1 October 1951) is a Dutch communist politician and activist who served as a municipal councillor in Midwolda, Scheemda, and Oldambt between 1982 and 2026.

== Political career ==
Modderman began his political career in 1970, when he joined the General Dutch Youth League, the youth wing of the Communist Party of the Netherlands (CPN). Following the 1982 municipal elections, he became a member of the municipal council of Midwolda. Due to municipal reorganizations in 1990 and 2010, he subsequently served on the councils of Scheemda and Oldambt. When the CPN merged with the other Rainbow parties in 1992 to form GroenLinks, he joined the New Communist Party–NCPN. Modderman remained active in that party until 1999; he served on its national board and was the lead candidate for the NCPN in the 1998 general election.

In 1999, Modderman and the NCPN came into conflict over the Blauwestad construction project and he founded the United Communist Party (Dutch: Verenigde Communistische Partij, VCP), which he led until 2026. Resistance against Blauwestad remained one of the spearheads of the VCP. Later, as a municipal councillor, Modderman protested against the new construction of cultural center De Klinker (lit. 'The Clinker') in Winschoten and against the extraction of gas from the Groningen gas field. Modderman was the VCP's faction leader in the municipal council of Oldambt, where his party was represented with three seats at the time of his political retirement.

In the 2014 municipal elections, Modderman received the most votes of all politicians in Oldambt, after which talks started about the formation of a coalition government with the Socialist Party (SP), Party for the North (Dutch: Partij voor het Noorden, PvhN), and VCP. The latter left the negotiations, however, and the SP and PvhN formed a coalition with the Labour Party and Christian Democratic Appeal instead.

On 14 May 2018, Modderman was appointed as acting chairman of the municipal council after the sudden death of mayor Pieter Smit.

In 2022, Modderman's health began to decline. Despite his illness, he decided to serve one last time as the lead candidate for the VCP in the 2026 municipal elections. His final municipal council meeting took place in September 2026. He designated Eppo Boven as his successor on the council.

== Personal life ==
Engel Modderman grew up in a working class family in Winschoten, where politics was never a topic of conversation. He has been married since 1970 to Greetje Modderman-Mulder, through whose family he came into contact with communism. The couple has a son who lives in Serbia, whom they intended to join in 2026 after Modderman's retirement from politics.
