= United Communist Party (Netherlands) =

United Communist Party Verenigde Communistische Partij
- Founded: 1999
- Split from: NCPN
- Headquarters: Torenstraat 26, 9671 EE Winschoten
- Ideology: Communism; Marxism-Leninism
- Political position: Far-left
- Colours: Red; Yellow
- Oldambt municipal council: 3 / 25

Website
- http://vcpoldambt.nl/

United Communist Party (Dutch: Verenigde Communistische Partij or VCP) is a small Marxist-Leninist party in the Netherlands, formed in 1999, and mainly based in Oldambt and Pekela. It is a break-away party from the New Communist Party–NCPN.

== History ==
The VCP was created as a local split of the NCPN in East Groningen. The NCPN was created in 1992 by members of the Communist Party of the Netherlands (CPN) who had opposed the merger of the CPN with the other Rainbow parties to form GroenLinks in the late eighties. East Groningen is a traditional bulwark of support for the former CPN, and later the NCPN.

The main reason of the split lay in a disagreement surrounding a large construction project, consisting of mainly expensive villas, called Blauwestad. The Scheemda branch of the NCPN was opposed to the plan, while the Reiderland branch was in favor. In Reiderland, the NCPN was part of the governing coalition, whereas in Scheemda the party was part of the opposition. In 1999, this disagreement led to a definite split, with the Scheemda branch, led by Engel Modderman, forming the VCP.

In 2009, the municipalities of Scheemda and Reiderland merged with Winschoten to form the new municipality of Oldambt. Both the NCPN and the VCP contested the elections in the new municipality, but only the VCP won representation.

== Election results ==
Provincial councils
Province	2015	
Province	Votes (%)	Seats
Groningen	1,238; 0.5%	0
Total	1,238	0

Municipal councils
Municipality	2002		2006		2009		2014		2018		2022		2026	
Municipality	Votes (%)	Seats	Votes (%)	Seats	Votes (%)	Seats	Votes (%)	Seats	Votes (%)	Seats	Votes (%)	Seats	Votes (%)	Seats
Oldambt	Municipality did not exist				1,138; 8.5%	2	2,757; 16.0%	4	1,843; 11.9%	3	1,442; 9.8%	3	1,534; 9.8%	3
Pekela							413; 8.2%	1						
Scheemda	1,067; 14.8%	2	707; 10.0%	1	Municipality merged into Oldambt									
Total	1,067	2	707	1	1,138	2	3,170	5	1,843	3	1,442	3	1,534	3

== Ideology ==
The VCP describes itself as a party based upon scientific socialism as developed by Marx, Engels, and Lenin. The party strives to eliminate, through democratic means, all elements of capitalism and its outgrowths, such as fascism, Nazism, and all other forms of suppression and exploitation. In its day to day political work in Oldambt, the party focuses on transparency and the support of grassroots actions.
