= Joël Voordewind =

Dutch politician and development aid worker

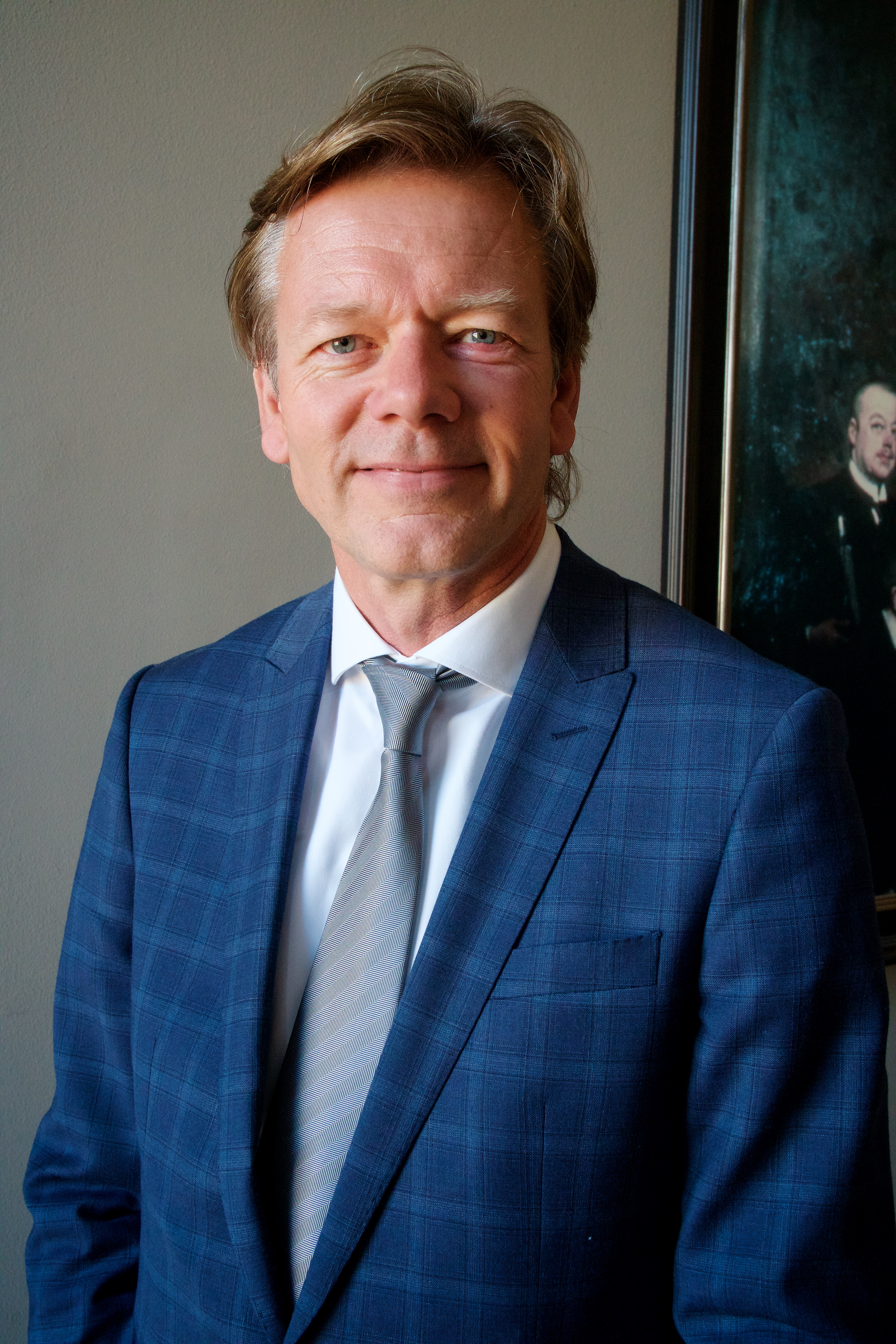

Member of the House of Representatives
- In office 30 November 2006 – 31 March 2021

Personal details
- Born: Joël Stephanus Voordewind; 9 July 1965 (age 61) Sleen, Netherlands
- Party: Christian Union
- Relations: Married
- Education: Vrije Universiteit Amsterdam (MA, Political science)
- Occupation: Politician, development aid worker
- Website: ChristianUnion website (in Dutch)

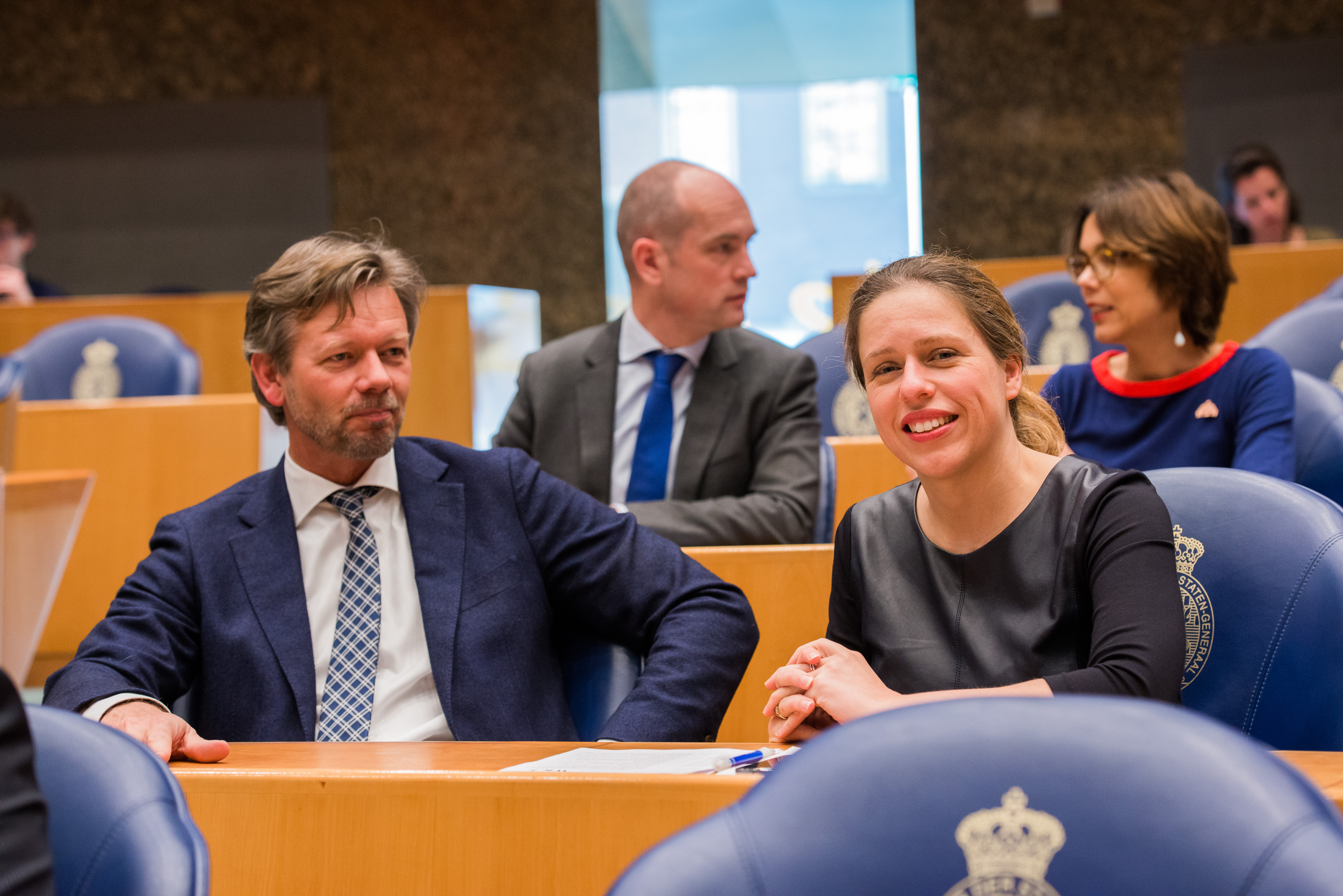
Joël Voordewind in the House of Representatives, next to fellow party member Carola Schouten (2017).

Joël Stephanus Voordewind (born 9 July 1965 in Sleen, Drenthe) is a Dutch politician and former development aid worker. As a member of the Christian Union (ChristenUnie) he was an MP from 2006 until 2021. He focused on matters of foreign policy, defense, development aid, youth and family. Since 7 July 2022, he has been an alderman of Alkmaar.

== Biography ==
Voordewind, after receiving a degree in political sciences (with a specialization in international relations) at VU University Amsterdam, started working as an assistant for the Dutch Labour parliamentary party. He began in 1991 and left the party in 1994. After this he worked for the European Union, the United Nations and an international Christian aid organisation named Dorcas Aid. For some time he was committed as a spokesman to the Dutch Secretary of Defence.

After some time Voordewind came to the conclusion that because of his Christian convictions, it would be better if he switched to a Christian party. He made this decision in 1999 and began to work for the parliamentary group of the Christian Union. In 2001 he became their campaign leader for the Dutch general election in 2002. He also led the campaign towards the general election in 2003. In 2003 he was a member of the States-Provincial of North Holland. Until 2006 he was head of the public relations division of the party. He was chairman of the local Christian Union in the Dutch capital Amsterdam for which in 2002 and 2006 he stood for the local council, but both times the CU gained no seats.

Voordewind was elected into the Dutch Parliament in 2006. He was the fourth name on the candidate list of the Christian Union, which doubled its number of seats from three to six. For this party he was the spokesman for all issues concerning the health system, welfare and sports, defence and European Affairs.

He is married and the father of two children. Son Manuel works as a press spokesperson for the Christian Union (CU) parliamentary group in the Second Chamber. He lives in Amsterdam and is a member of a Dutch Vineyard-church.

== Electoral history ==
Electoral history of Joël Voordewind
Year	Body	Party	Pos.	Votes	Result		Ref.
Year	Body	Party	Pos.	Votes	Party seats	Individual	Ref.
2002	Amsterdam Municipal council	Christian Union	1	2,309		Lost	
2002	House of Representatives	Christian Union	20		4	Lost	
2003	House of Representatives	Christian Union	16	491	3	Lost	
2006	Amsterdam Municipal Council	Christian Union	1	2,065		Lost	
2006	House of Representatives	Christian Union	4	1,849	6	Won	
2010	Amsterdam Municipal Council	Christian Union	30	136		Lost	
2010	House of Representatives	Christian Union		3,813	5	Won	
2012	House of Representatives	Christian Union		13,877	5	Won	
2014	Amsterdam Municipal Council	Christian Union	4	403	0	Lost	
2015	Provincial Council of North Holland	Christian Union	27		1	Lost	
2017	House of Representatives	Christian Union	3	6,166	5	Won	
2018	Amsterdam Municipal Council	Christian Union	49	20	1	Lost	
2022	Amsterdam Municipal Council	Christian Union	42	60	0	Lost	
2024	European Parliament	Christian Union	19 (Note: Voordewind participated as lijstduwer.)	3,656	0	Lost	
2026	Amsterdam Municipal Council	Christian Union	5	135	0	Lost	

== Honours ==
Upon his departure from the Second Chamber, Voordewind was appointed Knight in the Order of Orange-Nassau.
