= Communist Party of the Netherlands (1992) =

Communist Party of the Netherlands Communistische Partij van Nederland
- Abbreviation: CPN
- Founded: 14 November 1992
- Merger of: Ex-CPN members VCN
- Headquarters: Haarlemmerweg 177, Amsterdam
- Newspaper: Manifest
- Youth wing: Communist Youth Movement
- Ideology: Communism; Marxism–Leninism; Euroscepticism
- Political position: Far-left
- European affiliation: European Communist Action
- International affiliation: IMCWP
- Colours: Red

Website
- www.cpn.nl

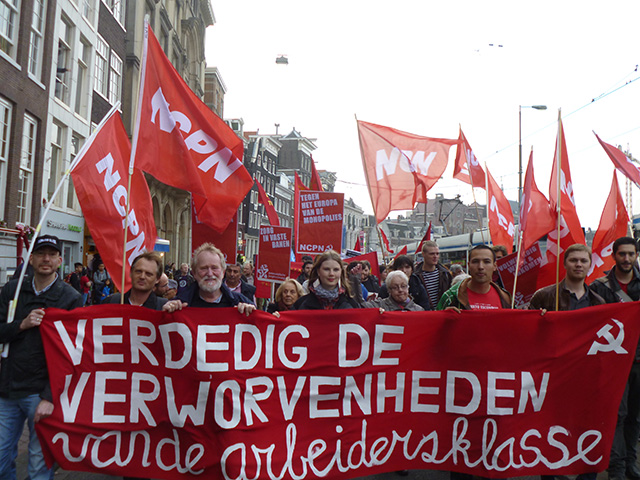
NCPN at the 2014 Labour Day demonstration in Amsterdam

The Communist Party of the Netherlands (Dutch: Communistische Partij van Nederland, CPN) is a Marxist-Leninist party in the Netherlands. The CPN was founded in 1992 as the New Communist Party–NCPN by former members of the Communist Party of the Netherlands who opposed its merger into GroenLinks. The party changed its name to CPN in 2026. The party releases a monthly newspaper called Manifest.

== History ==
In 1982, a group of members of the Communist Party of the Netherlands founded the newspaper Manifest, out of discontent with the CPN leadership. In 1984 this group founded the League of Communists in the Netherlands (VCN). The CPN dissolved in 1992 in order to make place for a new political party, GroenLinks, an alliance in which the CPN had participated since the 1980s. Subsequently, the VCN, together with many former members of the CPN, founded the New Communist Party–NCPN.

In 1999, the Scheemda branch of the NCPN split from the party and continued as the United Communist Party (VCP), under the leadership of Engel Modderman. The VCP supplanted the NCPN on the municipal council of Oldambt in 2009 and won additional representation in Pekela in 2014.

In 2003, the Communist Youth Movement (CJB) was founded as the NCPN's political youth organization. According to a statement from the NCPN after its 7th conference, the CJB contributed to a revival of the party in terms of membership and lowered the average age of its members.

In December 2025, the party indicated that it would not participate in the 2026 Dutch municipal elections, because it could not find a suitable successor for Rinze Visser, councilor of De Fryske Marren, who did not stand for re-election due to health problems.

== Ideology ==
The CPN actively supports the socialist government of Cuba. The party opposed the 2003 invasion of Iraq and is against Dutch military intervention through NATO or other military alliances. The party considers itself anti-capitalist, anti-fascist and anti-imperialist. It opposes both the active intervention of the European Union and NATO in the war in Ukraine but also the 2022 Russian invasion of Ukraine. It believes that a Leninist view of anti-imperialism is not choosing sides in an inter-imperialist conflict.

The CPN claims to work to preserve the heritage of the Dutch communist movement through commemoration of events like the February strike, holding that anti-communist laws in Europe and the normalisation of far-right ideas are erasing this legacy. The party also participates in the struggle against discrimination towards women and minorities with a migrant background, and is against homophobia and transphobia.

Although the party has had limited electoral successes to date, it claims not to shun elections and instead purports to work with trade unions and other similar organisations to advance its agenda. According to a party report, "the CPN participates in elections to the best of its ability" and views "bourgeois representative bodies" as platforms to promote its agenda.

== International activity ==
The CPN is a founding member of the European Communist Action and participates in the annual International Meeting of Communist and Workers' Parties. The CPN also often cooperates with fraternal parties like the Communist Party of Greece, Communist Party of Turkey, Communist Party of Cuba, Communist Party of Belgium, German Communist Party, and the Communist Party of Luxembourg.

== Elections ==
The CPN has participated in elections to the House of Representatives, provincial councils, and municipal councils, but never in elections to the European Parliament. In the period between 1994 and 2002, the CPN was part of the governing majority coalition in the municipality of Reiderland.

House of Representatives
Election	Lead candidate	Votes	%	Seats
1994	Rinze Visser	11,630	0.13%	0
1998	Engel Modderman	5,620	0.07%	0
2003	Alejandro de Mello	4,860	0.05%	0

Provincial councils
Province	1995		1999		2003		2007	
Province	Votes (%)	Seats	Votes (%)	Seats	Votes (%)	Seats	Votes (%)	Seats
Friesland	1,293; 0.5%	0			820; 0.3%	0		
Groningen	2,955; 1.3%	0	3,246; 1.4%	0	2,057; 0.8%	0	1,230; 0.5%	0
North Holland	2,397; 0.3%	0			1,302; 0.2%	0		
Overijssel	530; 0.1%	0	835; 0.2%	0				
Total	7,175	0	4,081	0	4,179	0	1,230	0

Municipal councils
Municipality	1994		1998		2002		2006		2010		2014		2018		2022	
Municipality	Votes (%)	Seats	Votes (%)	Seats	Votes (%)	Seats	Votes (%)	Seats	Votes (%)	Seats	Votes (%)	Seats	Votes (%)	Seats	Votes (%)	Seats
Amersfoort			679; 1.4%	0			242; 0.4%	0	137; 0.2%	0						
Amsterdam	3,017; 1.0%	0	968; 0.4%	0	819; 0.3%	0	511; 0.2%	0								
Bergen op Zoom									501; 1.9%	0 (Note: The NCPN and CJB competed under the banner of De Vonk (lit. 'The Spark'))						
Breda	183; 0.3%	0														
De Fryske Marren	Municipality did not exist										1,174; 5.7%	1 (Note: Due to the 2014 municipal reorganization, the local election was held in 2013)	1,462; 6.3%	2	1,168; 4.9%	1 (Note: Council member Rinze Visser retired from politics ahead of the 2026 municipal elections; the NCPN did not field a successor)
Enschede	589; 0.9%	0	316; 0.5%	0	482; 0.9%	0	291; 0.5%	0	282; 0.5%	0						
Groningen			501; 0.6%	0	866; 1.0%	0	539; 0.6%	0								
Heiloo			143; 1.2%	0	534; 4.6%	0	1,025; 9.2%	1 (Note: The NCPN won two seats, but fielded only one candidate)	811; 7.4%	1	1,164; 10.4%	2 (Note: The NCPN lost one seat when council member Cor de Boer defected to Heiloo–2000)	882; 7.4%	1 (Note: Council member Willem Gomes died on 12 September 2018; his successor, Bas van Beusekom, joined Gemeentebelangen Heiloo)		
Hoorn	417; 1.5%	0	210; 0.9%	0												
Lemsterland	900; 14.8%	2	738; 12.7%	2	907; 15.1%	2	1,038; 16.3%	3	947; 15.8%	2	Municipality merged into De Fryske Marren					
Middelburg			135; 0.8%	0												
Oldambt	Municipality did not exist								310; 2.3%	0 (Note: Due to the 2010 municipal reorganization, the local election was held in 2009)						
Opsterland	311; 2.1%	0														
Reiderland	2,052; 50.2%	7	1,303; 35.7%	5	1,150; 34.1%	5	621; 18.3%	2	Municipalities merged into Oldambt							
Scheemda	695; 8.9%	1	1,002; 12.9%	2	110; 1.5%	0			Municipalities merged into Oldambt							
The Hague			203; 0.1%	0												
Winschoten	390; 4.0%	0							Municipality merged into Oldambt							
Total	8,554	10	5,995	9	4,868	7	3,229	5	2,678	3	2,338	3	2,344	3	1,168	1
