= Krista van Velzen =

Dutch politician

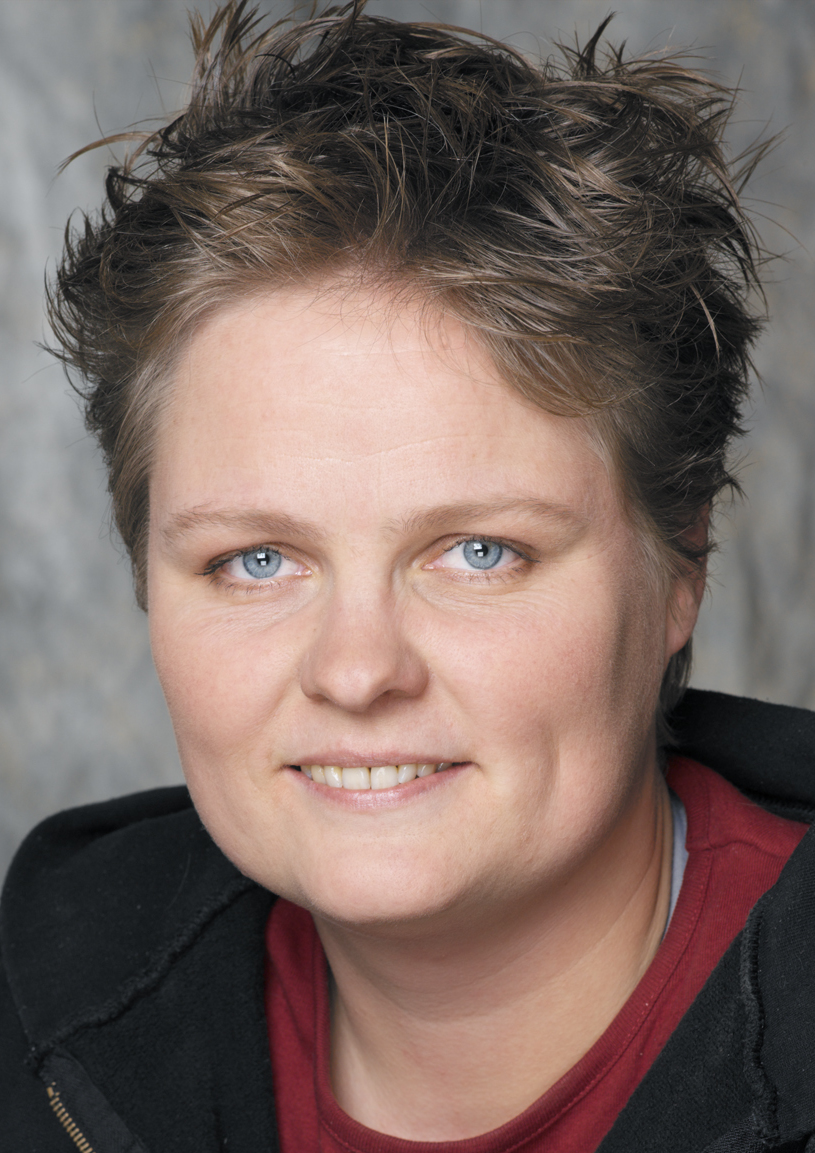
Krista van Velzen

Krista van Velzen (born 15 September 1974) is a Dutch politician. From 2002 to 2010, she was a member of the Dutch House of Representatives for the Socialist Party.

== Career ==
Krista van Velzen was born in St. Nicolaasga in Friesland. While in secondary school, she worked as a volunteer at the IVN (Instituut voor Natuurbeschermingseducatie - Institute for Conservation Education). After pre-university education at Newmancollege in Breda and a preparatory course for higher education in forestry and natural resources management, she decided to work—again as a volunteer—with Stichting Kollektief Rampenplan, an organic-vegetarian catering collective that supports actions and events throughout Europe by cooking for activists.

=== Disarmament ===
In 1995, she organised a hike from Brussels to Moscow on behalf of a nuclear-free world. In subsequent years, she was active in the 10 years after Chernobyl campaign and with the campaign by Czech environmentalists against the construction of the Temelín Nuclear Power Station. She also worked in Ghent, in Belgium, with the pressure group Voor Moeder Aarde (For Mother Earth; later merged into Friends of the Earth Flanders) in various campaigns concerning nuclear weapons, nuclear power and nonviolence.

Van Velzen was involved in direct action for disarmament at Faslane Naval Base in Scotland, where she was arrested after going aboard a nuclear submarine with a hammer to 'dismantle' it. In January 2007, she was arrested again, this time with six British parliamentarians, during a year-long blockade action at the base. As a result of her activities she has a criminal record.

During the Kosovo War, she organised a walk from the International Criminal Court in The Hague to NATO headquarters in Brussels. In 1999, she also founded the Ghent Ecological Centre. In the summer of the same year, she began work as an employee with the Socialist Party group in the House of Representatives, where she was concerned with defence, agriculture and food safety. As part of her work, she was also a member of the working group on genetic engineering and co-wrote the party brochure Wat moeten we met de genetische technologie (What should we do about gene technology).

In early summer 2008, she played a role in the whistleblower case of Fred Spijkers.

=== Election to the House of Representatives ===
In the elections of May 2002, she was elected to the House of Representative for the Socialist Party. On 25 June 2002, she made her maiden speech on the employment of 17-year-olds in the armed forces. In the 2006 parliamentary elections, she was fifth on the party list and was re-elected with more than 14,000 preference votes. Van Velzen sits on the Recommendation Committee of the Nederlands Sociaal Forum (Netherlands Social Forum, an organisation of Dutch NGOs and alter-globalist groups).

Her retirement pay was terminated after the TV programme PowNews revealed that she was staying abroad for a prolonged period and thus could apply elsewhere. A Socialist Party representative said, "It has not been Krista's intent to go cycling at the taxpayer's expense".

== Electoral history ==
A (possibly incomplete) overview of Dutch elections Krista van Velzen participated in
| Election | Party | Candidate number | Votes |
|---|---|---|---|
| 2002 Dutch general election | Socialist Party | 5 | |
| 2003 Dutch general election | Socialist Party | 5 | 4.694 |
| 2006 Dutch general election | Socialist Party | 5 | 14.081 |
| 2010 Dutch general election | Socialist Party | | 3.368 |
| 2014 Dutch municipal elections in The Hague | Socialist Party | 30 | 155 |
| 2017 Dutch general election | Socialist Party | 46 | 218 |
| 2019 European Parliament election in the Netherlands | Socialist Party | 29 | 2.030 |
| 2022 Dutch municipal elections in Apeldoorn | Socialist Party | 22 | |

== Personal life ==
Van Velzen was raised a Mennonite and still identifies as a Baptist. She has described herself as "bisexual, 100%" and was out when a member of the House of Representatives.

== See also ==
- List of peace activists
