= Pieter Smitbrug =

Bridges in Groningen, Netherlands

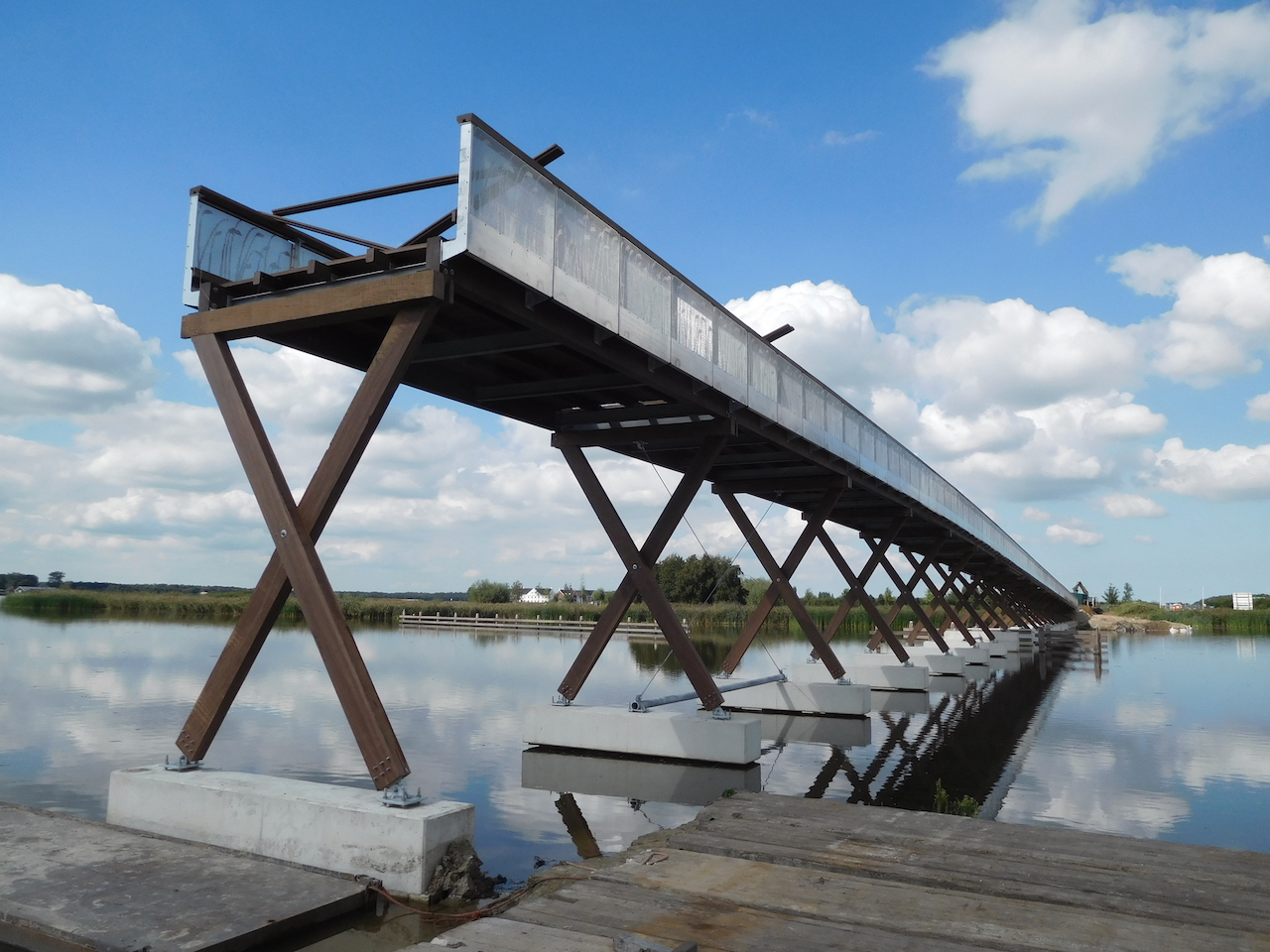
The Blue Carpet under construction in September 2020

The Pieter Smitbrug is a series of bridges in Groningen, Netherlands, which completed in February 2021. It connects the village of Blauwestad with Winschoten, the largest city in the region. It is a cycle and footbridge, 3.5 metres (11 ft) wide and 800 metres (2,600 ft) long. Its estimated cost is 6 million euro.

The bridge deck is made of 350 cubic meters of FSC-certified Lophira alata wood from Gabon, Africa, supplied by Wijma Kampen B.V. The bridge has an 80-year design life. It is designed to be bat-friendly in paint and solar LED lighting.

The 2004 Blauwestad project was created to revive the Oldambt area of East Groningen, which had been declining in population and economically poor since the 1980s. The Oldambtmeer was created by re-flooding fallowed land in 2005, and the future town of Blauwestad was also named in 2005. Residents began to arrive in small numbers in 2006, and changes in the global markets caused redesigns in 2010 and 2013. Beginning in 2015, asylum seekers began to populate the area as part of the European migrant crisis, setting 125 homes.

The bridge crosses the Oldambtmeer, the A7 motorway, the Winschoterdiep, and a nature preserve (part of the Nature Network of Netherlands). It will have access stairways to the Oldambt neighborhoods of Oostereinde and Noordereinde.

== Naming ==
The bridge was named De Blauwe Loper in Dutch (The Blue Carpet) during construction. In October 2018, the definitive name of the bridge was announced, Pieter Smit Bridge, after former Oldambt mayor Pieter Smit, who had died the same year.
