= Rinze Visser =

Dutch communist politician (1938–2026)

Member of the municipal council of De Fryske Marren
- In office 2014–2026

Member of the Provincial Council of Friesland
- In office 1976–1978

Member of the municipal council of Lemsterland
- In office 1970–2013

Personal details
- Born: 18 December 1938 Lemmer, Netherlands
- Died: 16 October 2026 (aged 87) Lemmer, Netherlands
- Party: NCPN/CPN
- Other political affiliations: CPN (1958–1985); VCN (1985–1992)
- Spouse: Lenie Visser-Wheda (m. 1964)
- Children: 3

Rinze Visser (18 December 1938 – 16 October 2026) was a Dutch communist politician who served as a municipal councillor in Lemsterland and De Fryske Marren. With nearly 56 years of continuous council membership since 1970, by 2026 he was the longest-serving politician in the Netherlands and one of its last communist elected representatives.

== Political career ==
=== Communist Party of the Netherlands (1958–1985) ===
Rinze Visser came into contact with communist ideology at an early age through his father. Visser became a member of the Communist Party of the Netherlands (CPN) in 1958 and was first elected to the municipal council of Lemsterland in the 1970 municipal elections. He succeeded Anne Visser (no relation), who had represented the CPN in Lemsterland for the previous 25 years. From 1978 to 1982, Visser also served as a member of the party board of the CPN.

In 1978, Visser visited the German Democratic Republic as part of a CPN party board delegation and met Erich Honecker. During the visit, the focus was primarily on the popular opposition to the neutron bomb, and a wreath was laid at the Memorial to the Victims of Fascism and Militarism in East Berlin.

In the 1978 provincial elections, Visser served as the CPN's lead candidate in Friesland; however, no seat was won. In the 1979 European Parliament election, he was in the 17th position on the party's candidate list. Visser was also a candidate in the 1980 Senate election.

=== HOC/VCN, Party of Communists in the Netherlands (1982–1992) ===
In 1982, Visser became involved in the Horizontal Consultation of Communists (Dutch: Horizontaal Overleg van Communisten, HOC), an internal, orthodox Marxist–Leninist pressure group within the CPN. Visser, in particular, had opposed the faction within the CPN that sought to merge the party into a broad progressive movement.

The HOC broke away from the CPN in 1985 and reconstituted itself as the VCN, Party of Communists in the Netherlands. Visser had been one of the founders of the VCN and immediately became a member of the party board. He was re-elected to the municipal council of Lemsterland in the 1986 and 1990 municipal elections. Furthermore, Visser stood as a candidate for the VCN for the House of Representatives on several occasions; during the 1986 general election as the second candidate on the party list, and during the 1989 general election as the lead candidate. He remained the only elected representative of the VCN.

=== New Communist Party–NCPN (1992–2026) ===
When the CPN ceased to exist in 1991, the VCN, alongside a number of local communist groups, merged into the New Communist Party–NCPN. Visser remained a councillor in Lemsterland on behalf of the NCPN. In 2014, Lemsterland was merged into the new municipality of De Fryske Marren. Due to wide support in his native Lemmer (and in spite of slim support in the rest of the municipality), Visser won his re-election, though only as a one-man faction. In 2018, the NCPN went on to win an additional seat for Sake Barelds, though this seat was lost in the following election.

In the 1994 general election, Visser served as the lead candidate on behalf of the NCPN. In the 1998 and 2003 general elections he was placed respectively third and fifth on the ballot.

In addition to his council membership, Visser wrote a column for Manifest, the monthly newspaper of the NCPN. In November 2025, Visser indicated that due to ill health, as he suffered from chronic obstructive pulmonary disease (COPD), he would not stand for reelection in the 2026 municipal elections. For its part, the NCPN announced that it would not be participating in the elections, as no suitable successor to Visser could be found.

== Personal life ==
Rinze Visser had been married since 1964 to Lenie Visser-Wheda, who was a fellow NCPN member and who, leading up to the 2010 municipal elections, had also served a term as a councillor in Lemsterland. Before his retirement, Visser worked in the shipping and fishing industries.

Visser died from COPD on 16 October 2026, at the age of 87.
