= Jacob TV =

Dutch composer (born 1951)

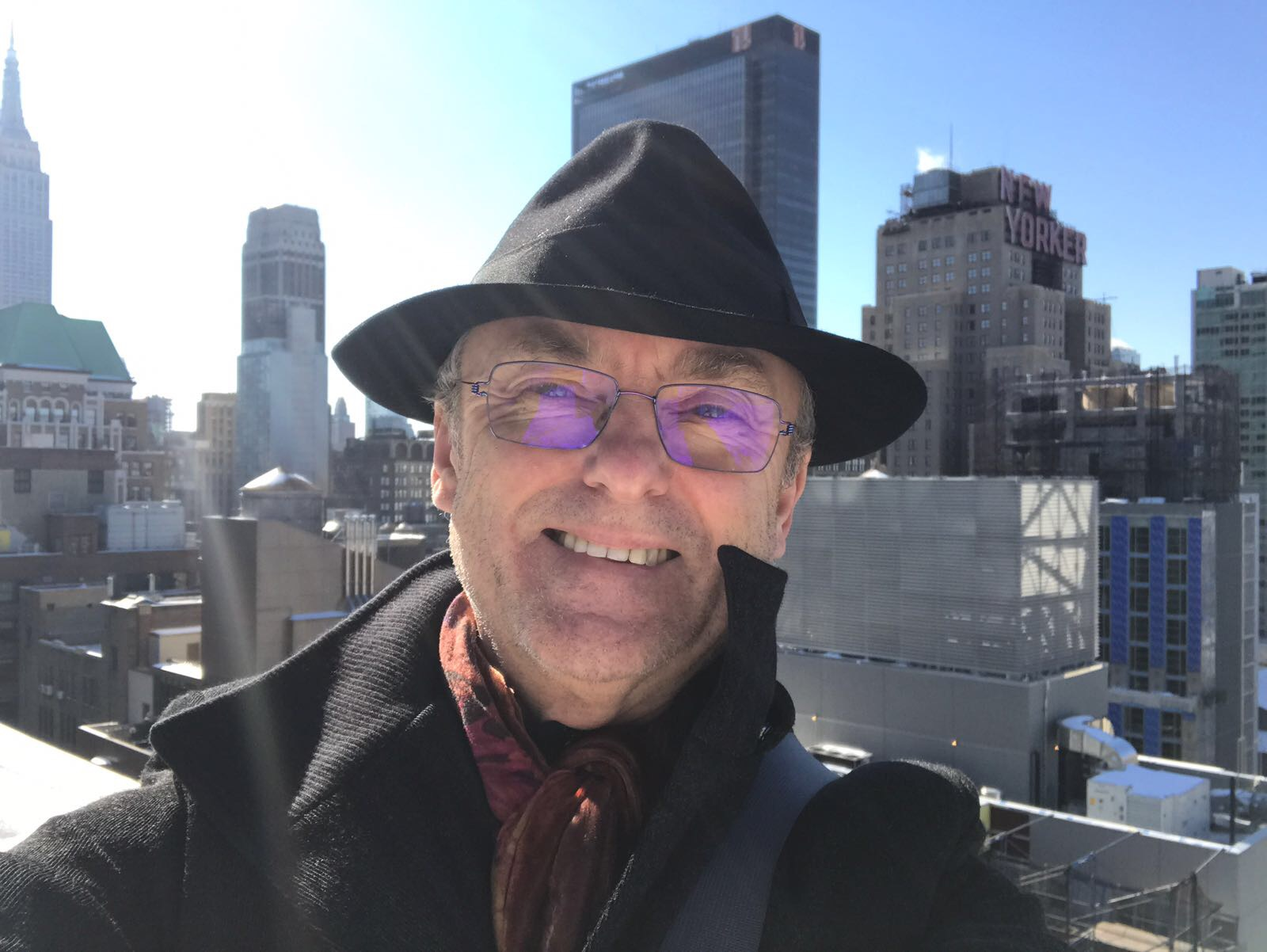
- Born: Jacob ter Veldhuis; 14 November 1951; Westerlee, Netherlands
- Occupation: Composer
- Website: www.jacobtv.net

Jacob ter Veldhuis (born 14 November 1951), known by the pseudonym Jacob TV, is a Dutch composer of contemporary classical music. Self-described as an "avant-pop composer", Jacob TV's music takes inspiration from Steve Reich, mixing classical music with elements of popular culture in a postmodernist manner.

== Life and career ==
Jacob ter Veldhuis was born on 14 November 1951 in Westerlee, Netherlands. In his youth, he had a variety of classical, rock, blues and jazz influences.

He studied composition with Willem Frederik Bon and electronic music with Luctor Ponse at the Groningen Conservatory.

== Music ==
Jacob TV's music includes elements of American popular culture and mass media, in a postmodernist manner. Commentators frequently compare this approach to the visual arts; the music critic Anne Midgette likened it to Pop art, particularly the collages of Tom Wesselmann, while the musicologist Kevin Lewis described it as Warholian. Midgette also drew connections to the kitsch work of Jeff Koons, a comparison echoed by NRC Handelsblad, who described him as the "Jeff Koons of new music".

Jacob TV describes himself as an "avant-pop composer"; in light of his largely tonal style he remarks: "I pepper my music with sugar".
