= Dwars =

Dwars may refer to:

- Dooars, the alluvial floodplains in eastern-northeastern India and southern Bhutan
- DWARS, the youth wing of the GreenLeft, a Dutch green political party
