= 1999 Dutch municipal reorganization election =

- 16 November 1999
- 25 of 10,269 municipal seats up for election
- Turnout: 46.7 % (▼5.5 pp)

A municipal reorganization election was held in Nijkerk, Netherlands on 16 November 1999.

== Background ==
The election took place in one municipality that was involved in a reorganization operation that would be implemented on 1 January 2000. Hoevelaken and Nijkerk would be fused into the municipality of Nijkerk.

In 1998, Hoevelaken and Nijkerk had 13 and 21 municipal seats respectively, together 34. The new municipal council would have 25 seats. This would bring the nationwide count of municipal seats down to 10269 (from 10278, down by 9), and the total number of municipalities from 538 to 537.

== Results ==
Seat change is calculated by combining seat totals from Nijkerk and Hoevelaken during the prior elections in 1998.

Progressief 21 is a local party combining the local branches of Democrats 66, GroenLinks and the Labour Party, which gained a total of 5 seats in the relevant municipalities in 1998 (PvdA 4, D66 1, GL 0).

Party	Votes	%	Seats	+/–
Christian Democratic Appeal	3,412	27.11	7	-2
Christian Union – Reformed Political Party	3,418	27.16	7	0
Progressief 21 (D66-GroenLinks-PvdA)	1,426	11.33	3	-2
People's Party for Freedom and Democracy	1,163	9.24	2	-3
Partij Nijkerk	2,098	16.67	4	-1
Hoevelaken Nu	1,067	8.48	2	-1
Total	12,584	100.00	25	-9
Registered voters/turnout		46.7%		
