= League of Communists in the Netherlands =

League of Communists in the Netherlands Verbond van Communisten in Nederland
- Founded: 2 November 1985
- Dissolved: 1992
- Split from: CPN
- Succeeded by: NCPN
- Headquarters: Kouwenoord 73, 1104 KB, Amsterdam
- Ideology: Communism; Marxism-Leninism; Anti-revisionism
- Political position: Far-left

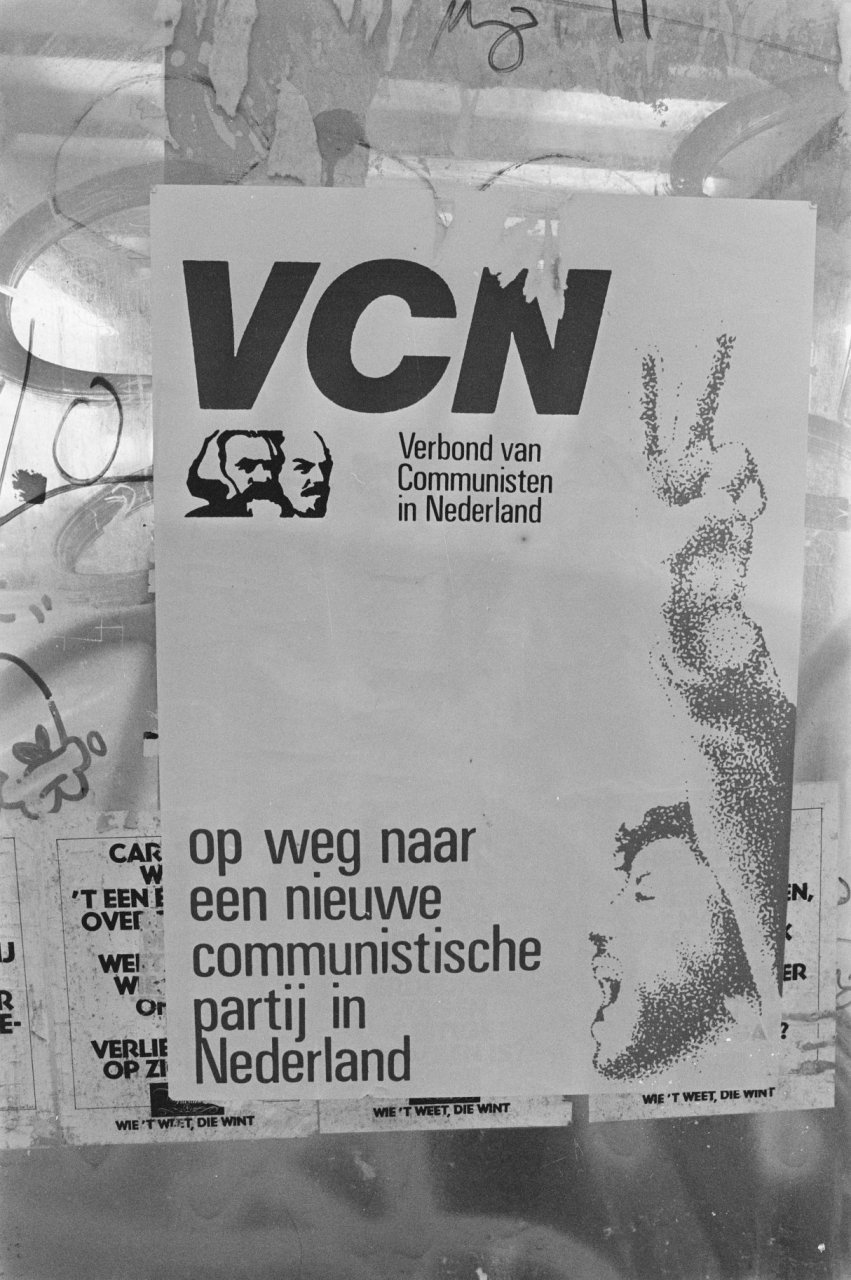
A propaganda poster produced by the party in 1985.

The League of Communists in the Netherlands (Dutch: Verbond van Communisten in Nederland, VCN) was a communist party in the Netherlands.

== History ==
The VCN was the result of a split in 1984 in the Communist Party of the Netherlands (CPN), who disagreed with the revisionist and Eurocommunist line of the new leadership of the CPN. In 1982 an anti-revisionist platform within the CPN emerged, called the Horizontaal Overleg Communisten, (Horizontal Forum of Communists, HOC) which at first functioned as a lobby group within the CPN. Former member of parliament Fré Meis and the only communist mayor of the Netherlands, Hanneke Jagersma, were the more prominent supporters of the platform.

After the CPN Congress of 1984, in which democratic centralism and Marxism-Leninism were abandoned, the HOC decided to split from the CPN and form the VCN.

The VCN consisted mostly of former CPN members from Amsterdam, Limburg, North Brabant and the city of Groningen. Remarkably the party had until 1989 very little support in the CPN stronghold of Northeast-Groningen.

In 1986, the VCN contested the Tweede Kamer elections, but only gathered 4,618 votes, just 0.1% of the votes. However the CPN just barely missed the 0.67% hurdle and therefore lost its representation. It was the first time since 1918 that the communist party wasn't represented in the Tweede Kamer.

In 1989, after the CPN formed an electoral coalition with the Political Party of Radicals (PPR), the Pacifist Socialist Party (PSP) and the Evangelical People's Party (EVP) called GroenLinks it again contested the Tweede Kamer elections, and although gaining more votes, it still did not get close to winning a seat (7,361 votes, 0.1%). It was estimated in 1989 that the VCN had about a thousand members.

In 1990, the VCN was invited by the CPN to participate in the merger talks that would lead to the definitive formation of GroenLinks. However, this invitation was rejected by the VCN, because they accused the CPN of pushing for the dissolution of the CPN as a political party.

In 1992, the CPN would indeed dissolve and in turn the VCN merged with CPN chapters that refused to join GroenLinks and the remnants of the HOC to form the New Communist Party–NCPN. The HOC continues to exist as the publisher of the communist newspaper Manifest.

== Election results ==
Tweede Kamer
Year	Votes	Percentage	Lead candidate
1986	4,618	0,05%	Laurens Meerten
1989	7,361	0,08%	Rinze Visser

Provinciale Staten (1991)
Province	Votes	Percentage
Groningen	1,963	0,80%
Friesland	643	0,23%
Overijssel	259	0,06%
North Holland	1,294	0,15%

Gemeenteraad (1986)
Municipality	Votes	Percentage	Seats
Appingedam	81	1,10%	0
Groningen	361	0,36%	0
Heerenveen	269	1,21%	0
Opsterland	97	0,66%	0
Lemsterland	433	6,68%	1
Sneek	340	2,06%	0
Amsterdam	3,614	1,08%	0
Rotterdam	809	0,30%	0
Helmond	612	2,08%	0
