= Thierry Aartsen =

Dutch politician (born 1989)

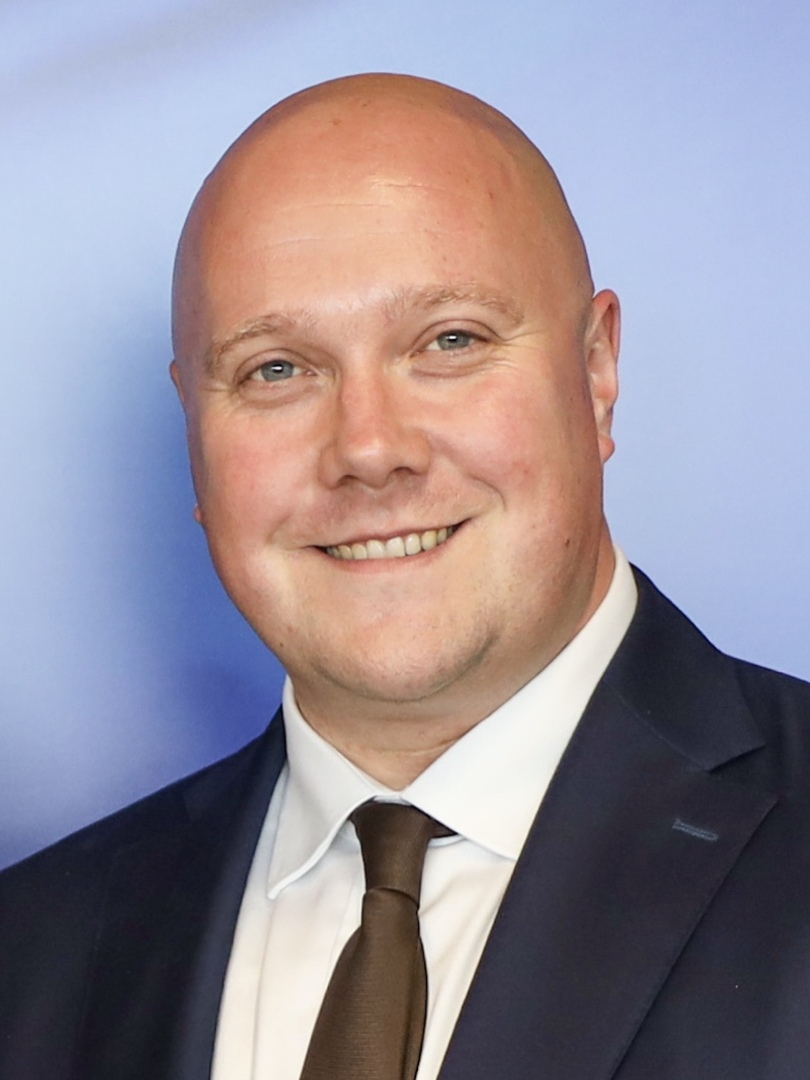
- Aartsen in 2025

Member of the House of Representatives
- Incumbent
- Assumed office 13 September 2018

Personal details
- Born: Alfons Adrianus Aartsen; 19 December 1989 (age 36) Breda, Netherlands
- Party: VVD

Alfons Adrianus "Thierry" Aartsen (born 19 December 1989) is a Dutch politician who has been serving as a Member of the House of Representatives since September 2018. He served as a councillor of Breda municipality between 2010 and 2018. Aartsen is a member of the People's Party for Freedom and Democracy (VVD).

== Education and career ==
Aartsen completed the havo at the Newmancollege in Breda. Afterwards, he studied European Studies at The Hague University of Applied Sciences, where he obtained a bachelor's degree.

Aartsen joined the People's Party for Freedom and Democracy (VVD) in 2007. In 2010, Aartsen was elected a member of the Breda municipal council. He was re-elected twice, in 2014 and 2018. He served as the chairman of the VVD in the council from 2015 to 2018. Aartsen also worked as an account manager at FME-CWM from 2013 to 2018.

For the 2017 general election, Aartsen placed 46th on the VVD's list of candidates, which was not high enough for him to be elected. In September 2018, the VVD announced that they had selected Aartsen to succeed Jeanine Hennis-Plasschaert. On 13 September, he was sworn in as a member of the House of Representatives. When he took office, he received criticism for a number of tweets that he had posted a few years earlier concerning suicides by train causing him delays. He apologised for the tweets. Following his re-election in 2023, Aartsen became the VVD's spokesperson for socioeconomic policy, labor conditions, labor migration, retirement benefits, and the Dutch royal house. He received another term after the October 2025 general election.

== Political views ==
Aartsen has referred to the Dutch welfare system as "a kind of redistribution monster", arguing that reductions in benefits as income increases discourage work and place the working middle class at a disadvantage. He has advocated for reforms to the system of benefits and tax credits.

He wrote a white paper on labor migration in 2024, marking a partial break with the VVD's prior stance against limiting the practice. Aartsen attributed housing, education, and healthcare issues to increased migration overall, which he described as the most pressing political issue. He argued that reliance on unskilled foreign workers should be reduced by subsidizing automation and by ultimately increasing labor costs for specific sectors. Aartsen also suggested that companies along with municipalities should take on greater responsibility for housing labor migrants.

== Electoral history ==
Electoral history of Thierry Aartsen
Year	Body	Party	Pos.	Votes	Result		Ref.
Year	Body	Party	Pos.	Votes	Party seats	Individual	Ref.
2017	House of Representatives	VVD	46	1,342	33	Lost (Note: Aartsen was appointed to the body later during the term due to a vacancy.)	
2021	House of Representatives	VVD	11	5,441	34	Won	
2023	House of Representatives	VVD	13	4,071	24	Won	
2025	House of Representatives	VVD	14	3,834	22	Won	
