= Communist Youth Movement (Netherlands) =

Youth wing

Communist Youth Movement Communistische Jongerenbeweging
- Founded: 21 September 2003
- Headquarters: Haarlemmerweg 177, Amsterdam
- Ideology: Communism; Marxism-Leninism
- Mother party: Communist Party of the Netherlands
- International affiliation: WFDY
- Website: voorwaarts.net

The Communist Youth Movement (Dutch: Communistische Jongerenbeweging, CJB) is a political youth organisation in the Netherlands. The CJB was founded on 21 September 2003, as an independent continuation of the youth wing of the New Communist Party of the Netherlands, NCPN Jongeren (NCPN Youth). It is the official youth organisation of the current Communist Party of the Netherlands (CPN) and publishes Voorwaarts! (Onwards!), an online magazine.

== Organization ==
The CJB in organized in different regions and chapters. The highest membership body is the general meeting, which is held once every two years. The movement is organized along the lines of democratic centralism. Chapters are active in North Holland, Overijssel, West Brabant, South Holland and Groningen. There are also members throughout the country who are not part of a chapter.

The CJB is an autonomous youth organisation, but is aligned with the CPN politically. The CJB permits only dual membership of the CPN and not of other political parties. Exceptions are possible, such as CJB members who are abroad joining their local communist organization, or members with an immigrant background joining a communist party which is active in their diaspora (for instance Chile, Greece or Iraq).

== Political activities ==
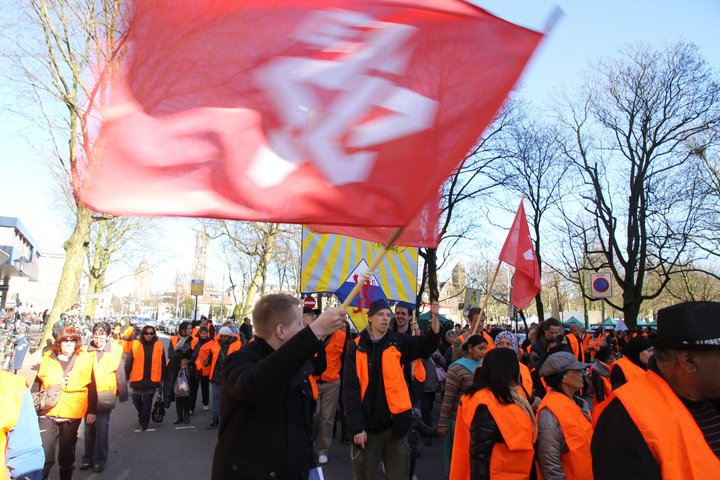
CJB members at a trade union action

The main goal of the CJB is raising class consciousness and emancipation of young people from the workers and unemployed class in the Netherlands. Its members are active in anti-fascist movements, the student movement and as organizers in the labor movement.

The CJB participates in the yearly Labor Day demonstrations organized by the FNV and the demonstration on the International Day for the Elimination of Racial Discrimination. In its anti-fascist work the CJB cooperates with the AFVN/Bond van Antifascisten.

The movement also organizes an alternative remembrance of the February Strike. In contrast to the official remembrance, the remembrance of the CJB specifically celebrates the communist ideology of the strikers.

== International ==
The CJB participates in the Meeting of European Communist Youth Organizations (MECYO) and is a member of the World Federation of Democratic Youth (WFDY). The movement regularly organizes actions in solidarity with Cuba.

== See also ==
- Algemeen Nederlands Jeugd Verbond (the youth organization of the original CPN and a predecessor of the CJB)
- Communist Party of the Netherlands
