= Aartsen =

Aartsen or van Aartsen is a Dutch surname. People with this surname include:

- Jan van Aartsen (1909–1992), Dutch politician
- Jozias van Aartsen (born 1947), Dutch politician
- Stefan Aartsen (born 1975), Dutch swimmer
- Thierry Aartsen (born 1989), Dutch politician
