= 2006 Dutch municipal elections =

Dutch municipal elections

Municipal elections were held in the Netherlands on 7 March 2006. About 11.8 million people could vote in 419 municipalities. Due to municipal reorganisations, 15 municipalities held elections in January 2006 and 24 municipalities held elections in November 2006. In some cities, such as Amsterdam, there were two elections, for the municipality and for the borough councils.

== Results ==
Official results were announced on 9 March 2006. The Labour Party (PvdA) obtained the most votes and seats, more than recovering from the losses of the 2002 elections. The Socialist Party (SP) almost doubled in size, partly due to its participation in more municipalities than in 2002. The Christian Democratic Appeal (CDA), the People's Party for Freedom and Democracy (VVD) and the Democrats 66 (D66) all had noticeable losses, which may in part have been caused by dissatisfaction with the national government, of which they are the coalition partners. Overall, local parties of the Leefbaar type lost out as well after some success during the previous elections.

In the 419 municipalities of the March elections the 8861 seats were filled as follows

Percentages for the Netherlands in total
| Party | Results 2006 (%) | Results 2002 (%) | Total seats | Change |
|---|---|---|---|---|
| Local parties | 21.4 | 20.6 | 2132 | -218 |
| Labour Party | 23.4 | 15.8 | 1988 | +671 |
| Christian Democratic Appeal | 16.9 | 20.3 | 1754 | -296 |
| People's Party for Freedom and Democracy | 13.8 | 15.3 | 1246 | -128 |
| Christian Union/Reformed Political Party | 6.5 | 6.3 | 635 | +76 |
| GroenLinks | 5.9 | 6.1 | 401 | -14 |
| Socialist Party | 5.7 | 2.9 | 333 | +176 |
| Leefbaar | 3.0 | 5.1 | 146 | -80 |
| Democrats 66 | 2.6 | 3.7 | 144 | -83 |
| Frisian National Party | 0.4 | 0.4 | 54 | +4 |
| Pim Fortuyn List | 0.3 | 0.1 | 10 | +6 |
| New Communist Party–NCPN | 0.1 | 01 | 7 | -1 |
| New Right | 0.06 | - | 1 | +1 |

Although the above shows the total results for the whole of the Netherlands, this has no official effect on national politics. It is often seen as an indication for it, but the issues and the parties that participate at the two levels do not always coincide. For example, SP got almost twice as many seats because they participated in almost twice as many municipalities as it did in 2002, which will in part explain their success, but even so, they still did not participate in all municipalities, so not everyone could vote for them. However, since this comparison is often made, a larger scale poll was held, showing that the government parties would have lost 17 seats in parliament if national elections had been held on that day (with CDA losing 13 seats) and the left wing parties would have each won seats; PvdA +7, SP +8 and GroenLinks +2. This is fairly similar to the election results and a confirmation of polls showing a possible majority for the three left-wing parties, which would be a first in the Netherlands and may be a reaction to what they call the present 'right-wing winter'.

The 'forgotten winner' (who received little media attention) was Christian Union (CU), which was allied with Reformed Political Party (SGP) in many municipalities, but represented the winning part with 420 seats (SGP has always had a very steady following). Leader André Rouvoet now said that this alliance might no longer be a good idea because the CU increased its vote share precisely in those places where SGP refused an alliance because the CU had a woman on its candidate list. The SGP's attitude towards women was believed to reflect badly on the CU. In keeping with their left-wing Christian nature, the CU was most successful in a band across the Netherlands that starts in the south west and largely coincides with the Bible Belt, but ends in the heavily socialist north east.

As D66 focussed on local issues in its campaigns but suffered further losses, a common occurrence when the party participates in government. In 2005, D66 minister Alexander Pechtold had proposed moving the elections in some municipalities to different years in order to reduce the influence of national politics, but this was opposed by the CDA.

Media attention before election day was manifested around Rotterdam, where the late Pim Fortuyn's Livable Rotterdam was a surprise winner in 2002, knocking the Labour Party (PvdA) out of the coalition for the first time since WWII. But now, PvdA even won more seats than it had before 2002, and became the largest party once again. Livable Rotterdam came second and had already made clear it was not willing to enter into a coalition with the Labour Party, making the formation of a coalition difficult because all other parties are small (less than 10% of the vote).

In these 419 municipalities, percentages of over 30% were reached almost exclusively by the PvdA (in 64 municipalities, mostly in the northern provinces, especially Groningen and Friesland) and CDA (59 times, mostly in southern provinces). Percentages over 40% were reached in 29 municipalities, again almost exclusively by PvdA (12) and CDA (10). Absolute majorities (over 50%), which would not require a coalition, are a rarity in a parliamentary democracy with proportional representation and occurred only twice. PvdA won an absolute majority in Winschoten, Groningen with 49.7% of the votes and 9 out of 17 seats in the council, and CDA in Tubbergen, Overijssel province with 58.3% of the vote and 12 out of 19 seats in the council.

Half the people voted for the person at the top of the list. One third voted for someone they had met personally. The enormous rise of SP in some municipalities presented several candidates with a problem because they have to take a seat in the council but could not combine it with their 'normal' jobs.

== Campaign ==
Polls showed a major shift in the issues. In 2006, people mentioned employment, poverty, traffic, housing and education, largely the issues that left-wing parties focused on. The issues of immigrant integration and safety, which had been important in 2002 and had led to the success of the Leefbaar parties, played a minor role this time. In Nijmegen, with its all-left coalition, people's sense of safety had risen from 21% to 52% since that coalition came to power, illustrating that this is not just a right-wing issue. The biggest shift among lower incomes was from the Christian Democratic Appeal (CDA) to the Socialist Party (SP), probably caused by the first two issues.

A major issue in the campaign of the right-wing People's Party for Freedom and Democracy (VVD) was to advise people not to vote for the PvdA. This was done in such a manner that PvdA leader Wouter Bos declared the VVD had been the best campaigner for the PvdA. He said about the VVD leader that "every time van Aartsen opens his mouth, we gain another seat".

== Voter turnout ==
Voter turnout across the Netherlands was around 58%, slightly more than in the 2002 municipal elections. Delfzijl was said to have the lowest turnout of the whole country, with 47.3% but this was due to 22% of the cast Delfzijl votes being blank, as a form of protest against the political mismanagement that entangled the city last year. The Delfzijl turnout with the blank votes included was 61.1%. The real lowest turnouts were in the major cities Eindhoven and The Hague, each with 47.5%. The highest turnouts are traditionally in smaller communities and especially at the Wadden islands in the North. The highest turnout this year was at Ameland with 87.3%.

People of foreign origin (known in the Netherlands as allochtonen) constitute about 2.2 million of the constituency of 11.2 million. Most are of German origin (320.000) and about half of non-western origin, most notably from Suriname (225.000) and Turkey (220.000). Voter turnout among allochtones was higher than previously and many have voted PvdA.

== Aftermath ==
VVD parliamentary leader Jozias van Aartsen announced that since his party lost votes, while he had had high hopes to gain some (overall outcome for the VVD was less than 14% this time), he would retire from the leadership. He would remain in the House of Representatives. Former party leader Hans Wiegel, who had hinted at returning to lead the party in the next general election announced he would not seek a return to politics. A likely candidate to succeed van Aartsen as political leader is Mark Rutte, the current staatssecretaris for higher education and science. He is seen as a representative for the more left-wing ('social liberal') side of VDD (although he himself denies this), illustrated by the fact that he does not wear a necktie, which, he says, illustrates that the VVD is for all people, not just an elite group.

For the Christian Democratic Appeal an important part of the campaign was that regional and national politics are two separate things. For this reason, prime minister Balkenende did not participate (much) in the campaign and declared after the elections that the CDA would not change its national policy.

D66 parliamentary leader Lousewies van der Laan remarked that this was the tenth election in a row (over 12 years) that D66 lost seats and that this time they would not seek the cause in external factors but within the party itself. People no longer knew what D66 stands for. An example was the wavering stance of D66 on the Afghanistan mission debates in December and January, first opposing it and then going along with it.

== Coalitions ==
There used to be a time limit to the duration of coalition talks, but that has been dropped, so the formations may take a long time.

The combination of the three left wing parties PvdA, GroenLinks and SP that already formed a coalition in Nijmegen (which was consequently nicknamed Havana on the Waal) has gained a majority in at least 39 municipalities, mostly in the Northeast and the Randstad, including 7 of the 12 largest municipalities and 20 of the 60 municipalities with an electorate over 50.000, including Maastricht and Heerlen, the two biggest cities in CDA stronghold province Limburg. However, although this combination is close to 50% of the seats in many municipalities where all three participated, a majority is in most cases only just not possible or too narrow to be comfortable. The biggest majority was in the small Groningen municipality of Pekela (11 out of 15 seats), but also in major cities like Amsterdam (33 out of 45), Nijmegen (24 out of 39), Utrecht (27 out of 45), Groningen (24 out of 39), Haarlem (22 out of 39) and Arnhem (23 out of 39) there are large majorities for PvdA, SP and GroenLinks. In Reiderland a non-left-wing council is not even possible. It is noteworthy that in Arnhem, that was often juxtaposed to nearby Nijmegen, such a coalition has now also become possible, although the existing very broad coalition hasn't lost its majority.

Another factor here is that the local branches confer with the national party because decisions at the two levels have to be harmonised. Nationally, PvdA is doing well, but in some municipalities too left wing a coalition may not go down well with some people, which may have negative effects on PvdA during the 2007 national elections. Also, local branches of a party may have a rather different signature from the local party, such as in Zaanstad, where the CDA is rather left wing. "They're called CDA, but that's where the similarity ends", according to a PvdA spokesman. And SP also differs strongly from place to place. In some places they are considered decent politicians, in others too troublesome (SP used to lean towards Marxism and that may not have disappeared everywhere). The subjects of housing and city renovation are often points of difference between PvdA and SP.

In Amsterdam, where this coalition would be biggest, SP have already left the talks, but PvdA and GroenLinks still have a majority of 27 out of 45 seats. In Arnhem the three parties are talking but there are differences between PvdA and SP over how money should be spent (housing or redistribution).

The Christian Union (CU) turned out to be very popular as a coalition partner, partly because their stance on social issues often coincides with that of the big winner PvdA, who led the coalition talks in most municipalities. Where PvdA and CDA form a coalition, they often took CU on board even when there was no need for a majority because, being both left-wing and Christian, they formed a bridge between those two parties.

On 4 April CU had already entered a coalition in 21 new municipalities, whilst keeping its position in municipalities where they already were part of a coalition. They had won 12% more seats but their coalition-participation had risen by 69%.

In Goes, the Christian parties CDA and SGP/CU formed a coalition with VVD on the day after the elections ("at record breaking speed"), without consulting the PvdA. This led to quite an uproar because it is customary that coalition talks are started by the biggest party, which was the PvdA. But what was really salient was that this was done on a Christian day of prayer for which the elections were shifted forward one day (elections are usually on Wednesdays) at the request of SGP, one of those new coalition partners. During inauguration hundreds gathered in front of the city hall, throwing eggs. The new opposition demonstratively left the city hall after the inauguration and a VVD member almost attacked a protester.
