= Blauwestad =

- Village
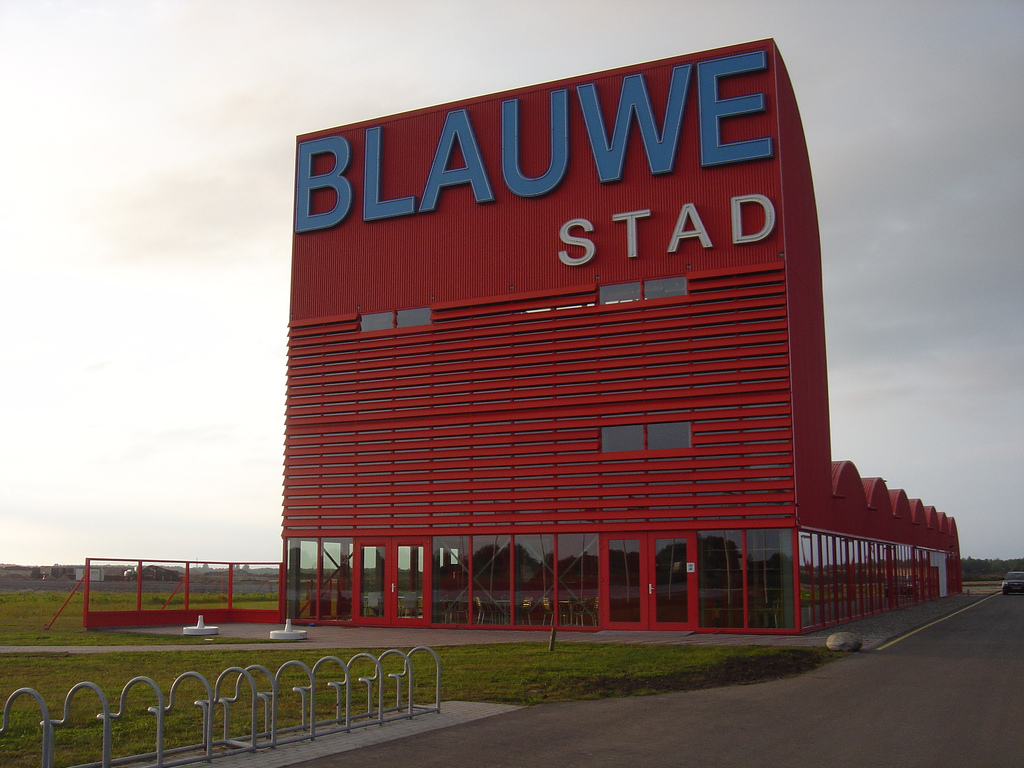
- Blauwestad project office in 2008

- Location in the province of Groningen in the Netherlands Blauwestad (Netherlands)
- Coordinates: 53°10′N 07°02′E
- Country: Netherlands
- Province: Groningen
- Municipality: Oldambt
- Postal code: 9685

Blauwestad (Dutch pronunciation: [ˌblʌu.əˈstɑt]) is a new build village, created in a large made lake, with luxery houses along the lakeside in the municipality of Oldambt in the Netherlands. It is situated on the east bank of the Oldambtmeer in the east of the province of Groningen.

== History ==
After the Oldambtmeer was created in 2005, the village of Blauwestad (English: Blue City) started to be developed. The first inhabitants settled in the village in 2006. In 2026 Blauwestad has 1674 inhabitants

== Geography ==
Blauwestad is located at 53°10′N 07°02′E in the municipality of Oldambt in the east of the province of Groningen in the northeast of the Netherlands. Blauwestad is north of the city Winschoten, east of Scheemda, southeast of Midwolda, south of Oostwold, southwest of Finsterwolde, and west of Beerta. It was created in and on the eastern bank of the artificial lake Oldambtmeer.
