= Westerlee, Groningen =

Westerlee
- Village
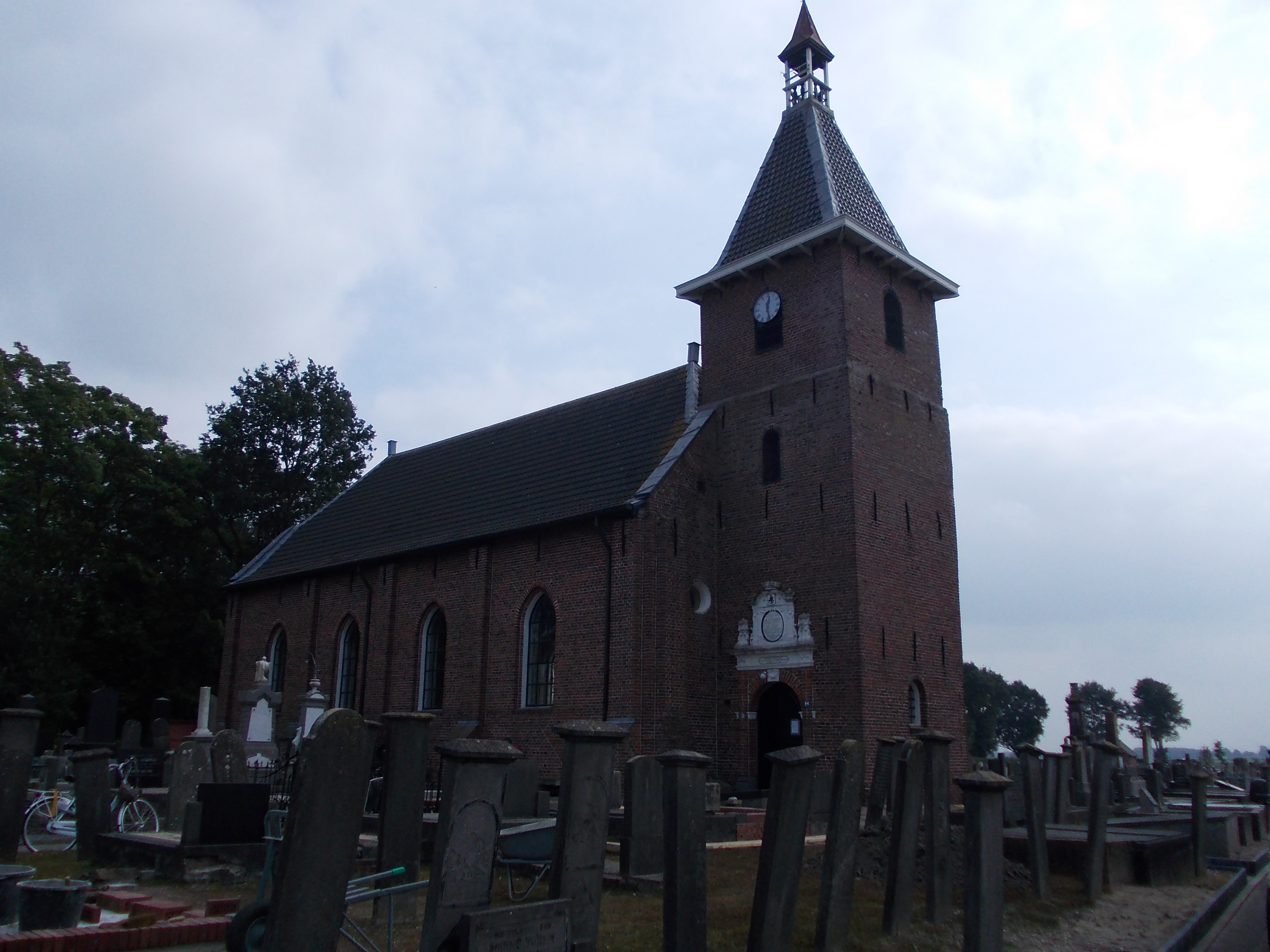
- Protestant Church of Saint George (Sint-Joriskerk) in 2012

- Location of Westerlee in the province of Groningen Westerlee (Netherlands)
- Coordinates: 53°8′42″N 6°59′13″E
- Country: Netherlands
- Province: Groningen
- Municipality: Oldambt

Area
  - Total: 15.93 km^{2} (6.15 sq mi)
- Elevation: 1.8 m (5.9 ft)

Population (2021)
  - Total: 1,490
  - Density: 93.5/km^{2} (242/sq mi)
- Time zone: UTC+1 (CET)
  - Summer (DST): UTC+2 (CEST)
- Postal code: 9678
- Dialing code: 0597

Westerlee is a village in the Dutch province of Groningen. It is located in the municipality of Oldambt, about 3 km west of the city of Winschoten.

Westerlee was a separate municipality until 1821, when it was merged with Scheemda.

== History ==
The village was first mentioned in 13th century as Westerle, and means "western burial mound". West has been added to distinguish between Heiligerlee. Westerlee is a road village which developed on the south side of the former Winschoten peninsula.

The Dutch Reformed church was built between 1776 and 1777 as a replacement of the medieval church. The tower has probably been enlarged in the late-19th century.

Westerlee was home to 241 people in 1840.

== Gallery ==
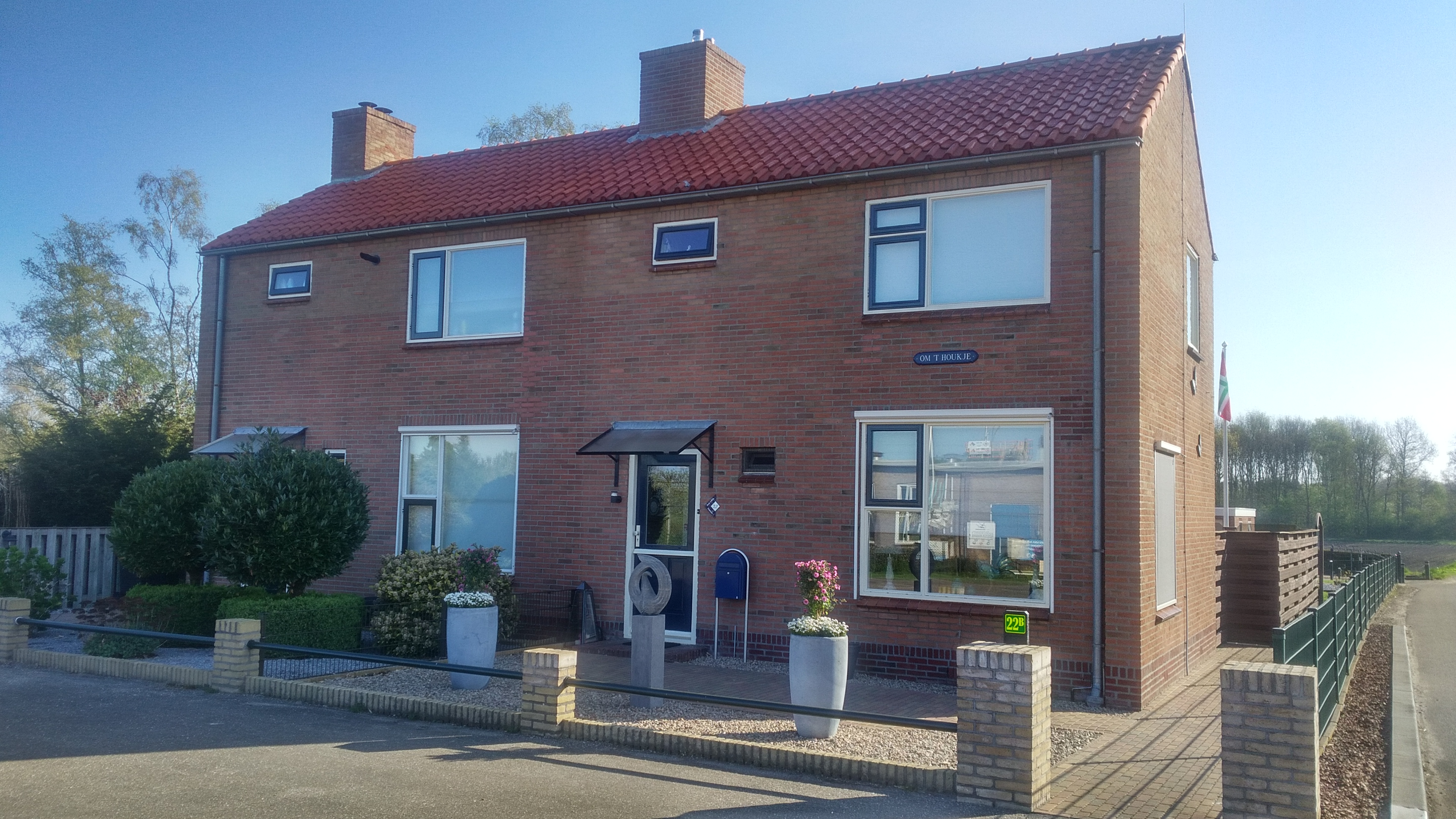
Houses in Westerlee

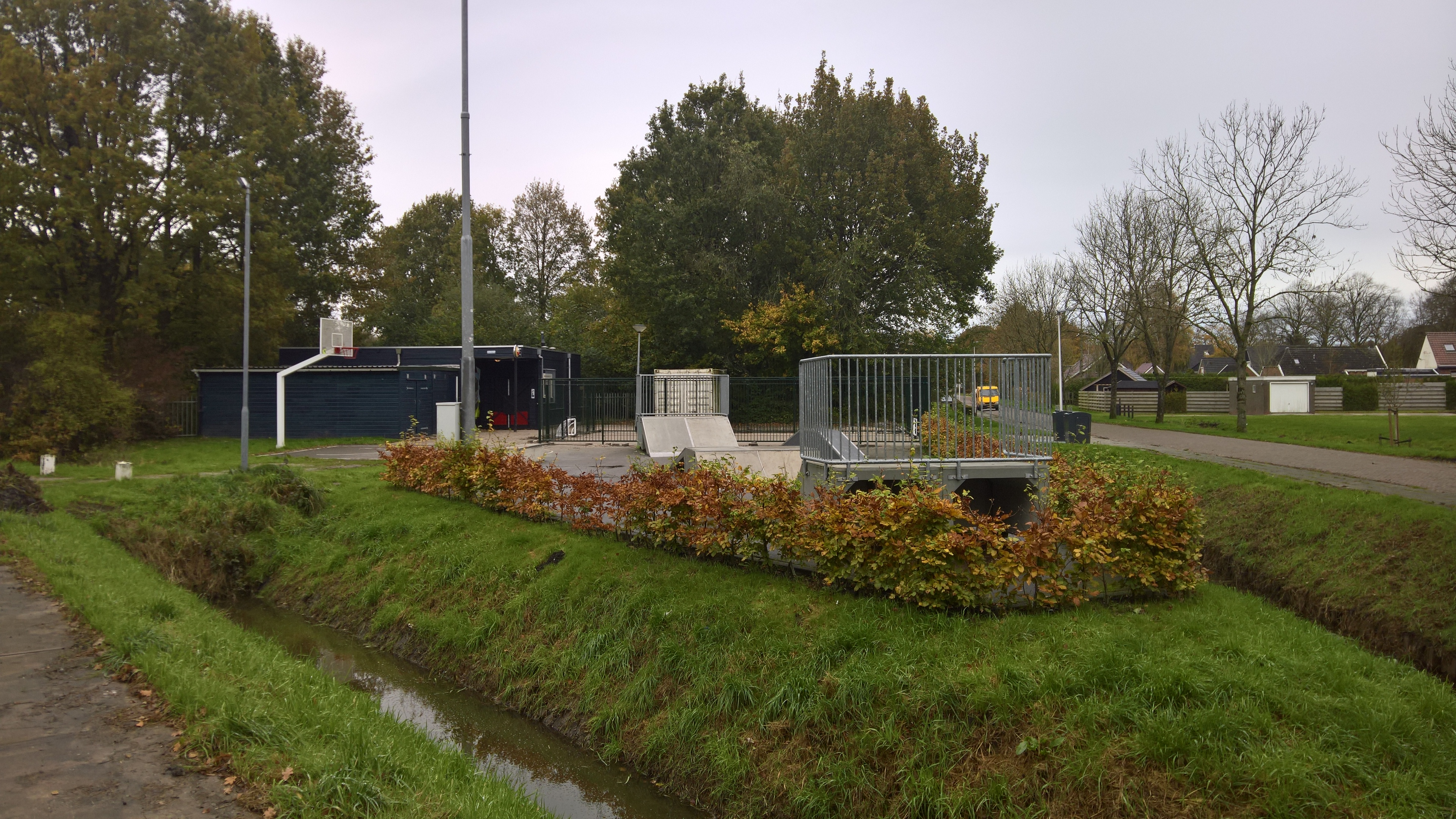
Sports park in Westerlee

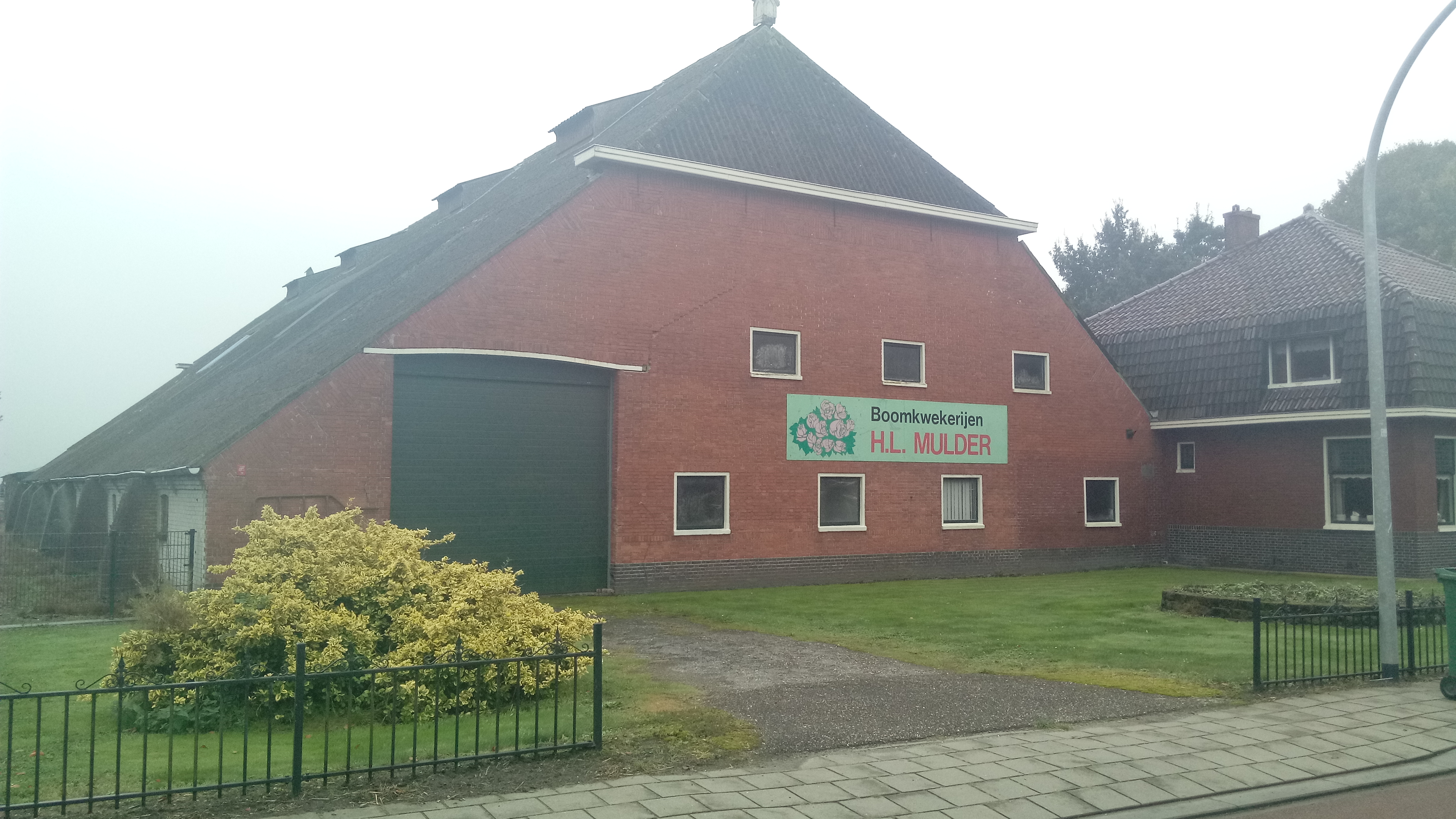
Farm in Westerlee

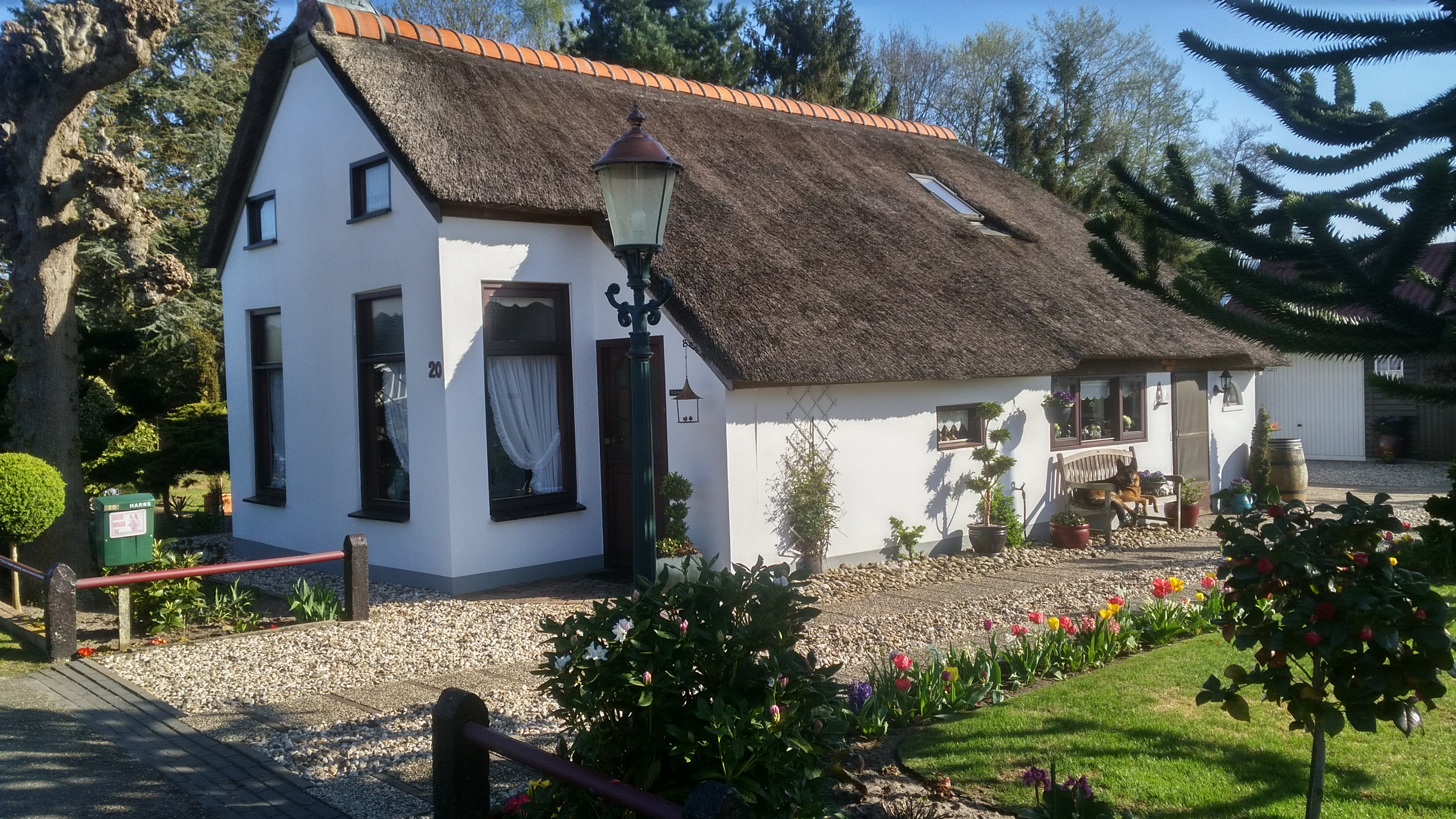
House in Westerlee
