= DWARS =

Youth wing of GreenLeft, a Dutch political party

DWARS DWARS, GroenLinkse Jongeren
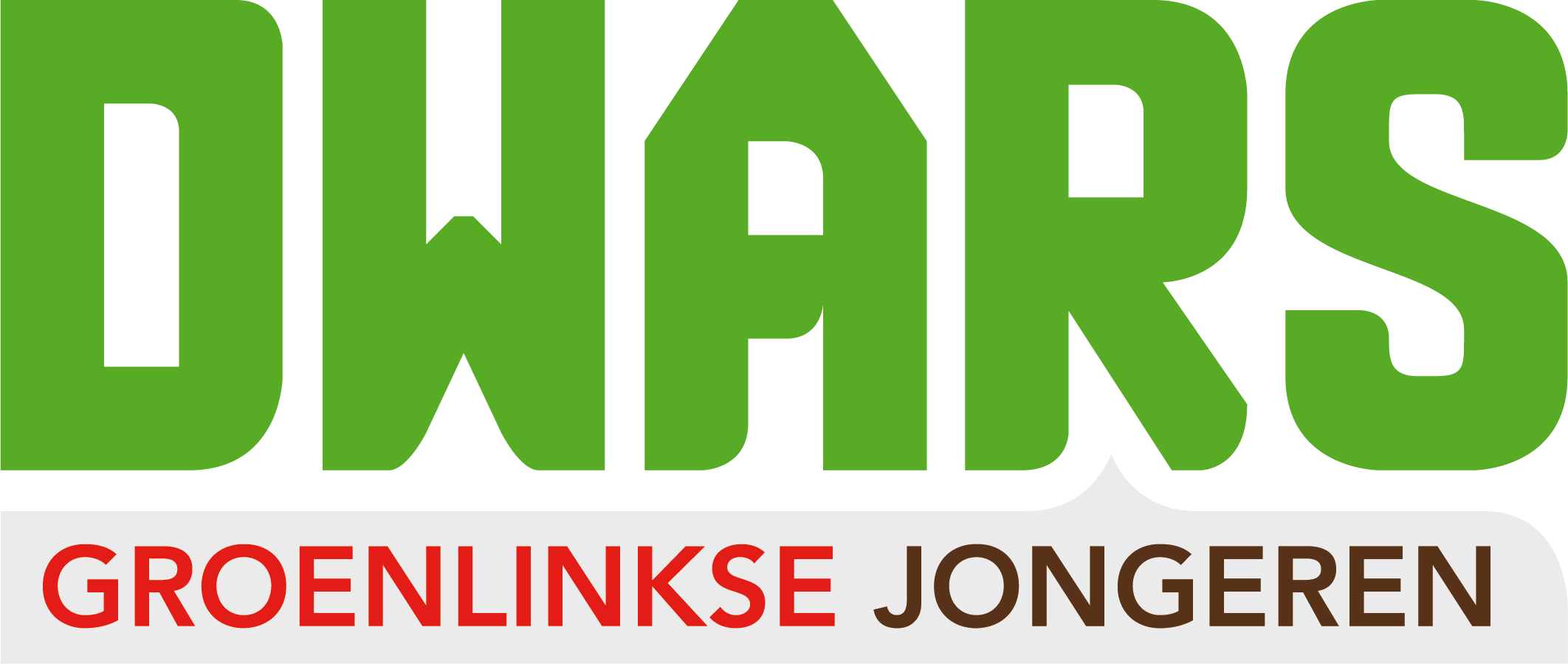
- Chairperson: Gijs Broere
- Founded: 1991
- Dissolved: 1 July 2026
- Merged into: PROTEST
- Headquarters: Sint Jacobsstraat 12, Utrecht, Netherlands
- Ideology: Green politics
- Mother party: Groenlinks
- International affiliation: Global Young Greens, Federation of Young European Greens
- Website: https://www.dwars.org

DWARS, GroenLinkse Jongeren was the independent youth wing of GreenLeft, a former Dutch green political party. On 1 August 2026 DWARS mergers with the Young Socialists into the new youth organisation 'PROTEST, Progressieve Jongeren'.

== Ideals and policies ==
Both the manifest for a better world, the organisation's program of principles and 2025 - DWARS' proposals for the future, the organisation's political program the party lists its five core-ideals.

== History ==
DWARS was founded on 4 January 1991. The foundation occurred at a congress on the 15th and 16th of December in Wageningen by the PSJG, the youth wing of the Pacifist Socialist Party, and the Political Party of Radical Youth (PPRJ), the youth wing of the Political Party of Radicals. Because of the merger of these two parties, together with the Communist Party of the Netherlands and the Evangelical People's Party, into GreenLeft, the youth wings were forced to merge too. The General Dutch Youth League, linked to the Communist Party of the Netherlands decided to continue on its own. The Evangelical People's Party did not have an independent youth wing. There were major differences between the two youth organisations. The PSJG was oriented towards actions and campaigning, mainly against nuclear power and weapons. Within the PSJG there was a large anarchist group, which was opposed to parliamentary democracy. The PSJG operated independent from the PSP. The PPRJ was much more moderate and was not opposed to parliamentary democracy. The PPRJ was very dependent on its motherparty, the PPR. This difference between parliamentary oriented members and action-oriented members. In the first ten years of its existence the anarchist PSP youth held a majority, and DWARS became more independent from GreenLeft. During this period Judith Sargentini was one of the spokespersons of the organisation. More recently the ties with GreenLeft have been tightened and a more moderate group has come to power.

In the last few years DWARS has been oriented towards cooperating with other youth wings of political parties. In 2004 they signed the Pepper-accords, together with ROOD, the ex-youth wing of the Socialist Party and the Young Socialists of the Labour Party, which called for tighter cooperation between the GreenLeft, the Socialist Party and the Labour Party, which would result in a new cabinet, after the next elections. It was called "pepper-accords" in reference to their colour (red) and taste (spicy), because a leftwing government in their view would produce exciting new leftwing policy. In 2001 DWARS signed the Paprika-accords together with the Young Socialists of the Labour Party and the Christian Democratic Youth Appeal, which also called for tighter cooperation between GreenLeft, the Christian Democratic Appeal and the Labour Party, which would result in a new cabinet, after the 2002 elections. It was called "paprika-accords" in reference to their colours (green, yellow and red), which correspond to the colours of the respective parties. But DWARS has also been able to convince the GreenLeft to stay close to its political ideals, in 2001 the youth wing started a petition under local representatives of the party, calling on the GreenLeft parliamentary party in the House of Representatives to revoke its support for the War against Afghanistan, the petition succeeded.

=== Name ===
The name is very difficult to translate. DWARS means both "transverse" and "stubborn" in English, making the translation "contrary" grammatically correct, but it does not cover the short and alternative meaning of the name.

== Organisation ==
DWARS had approximately 5,000 members, most of which were also members of GreenLeft. The national board consisted of eight members; a chairperson, secretary and treasurer, and five general boardmembers who share ten portfolios. The congress convened twice a year (with an extra congress being held extra four years to vote on a new political programme), and elected a new board at each summer congress, could set the lines for the political course, could amend the statutes and house rules and vote on motions and other positions.

DWARS publishes the independent magazine OverDWARS (a pun meaning both "across" and "about DWARS") and uses mailinglists to communicate to its members. One of those is called "the Minutespider" ("de Notulenspin") and the other, now simply called "the newsletter" used to be called the DWARSdoorsnee (a pun on the organisations name, meaning cross section)

=== Older forms of organisation ===
For a long period, DWARS did not have a chairperson or a board. It was organised according to anarchist principles.

Between 1991 and 1996 DWARS was a collection of campaigning groups with a fast changing composition. The most important groups were the UFO (a pun on the term UFO and Uitermate Fantasievol Overleg "Extremely Fantastic Council") which functioned as board, the ParGo (the Parliamentary Group), which was oriented towards the GreenLeft parliamentary party, Dodo (like the extinct animal) which addressed environmental issues, the Anti-Fa-working group, which followed organisations on the extreme right. DWARS published two magazines, "the Spider" and the "Former Disaster" ("Voorheen RamPSPoed", a continuation of the magazine of the PSJG, which incorporated the acronym of the motherparty, PSP).

Between 1996 and 1999 a crisis board took over, and in 1999 they proposed a new anarchist organisation, with executive working groups ("Uitvoerende Werkgroepen"), in which all members could join, of which representatives would come together in the coordinating council ("Coordinerend Overleg"). These representatives would function as board members and were directly elected on congresses. The coordinating council was joined by the Shadow Parliamentary Party ("Schaduwfractie") which followed the GreenLeft parliamentary party, later this group was called Youth Parliamentary Party (Jongerenfractie). This organisation was maintained until 2005, when the coordinating council and the youth parliamentary party merged to form a single board. Until 2007 it had two chairpersons, one for organisational matters and one for political affairs.

== International ==
DWARS was a member of Federation of Young European Greens (FYEG) and the Global Young Greens (GYG).

== Notable Ex-DWARSers ==
- Jesse Klaver, chairperson between 2008 and 2009
- Judith Sargentini
- Lyle Muns, chairperson 2015-2016
