= Pieter Smit =

Dutch politician (1963–2018)

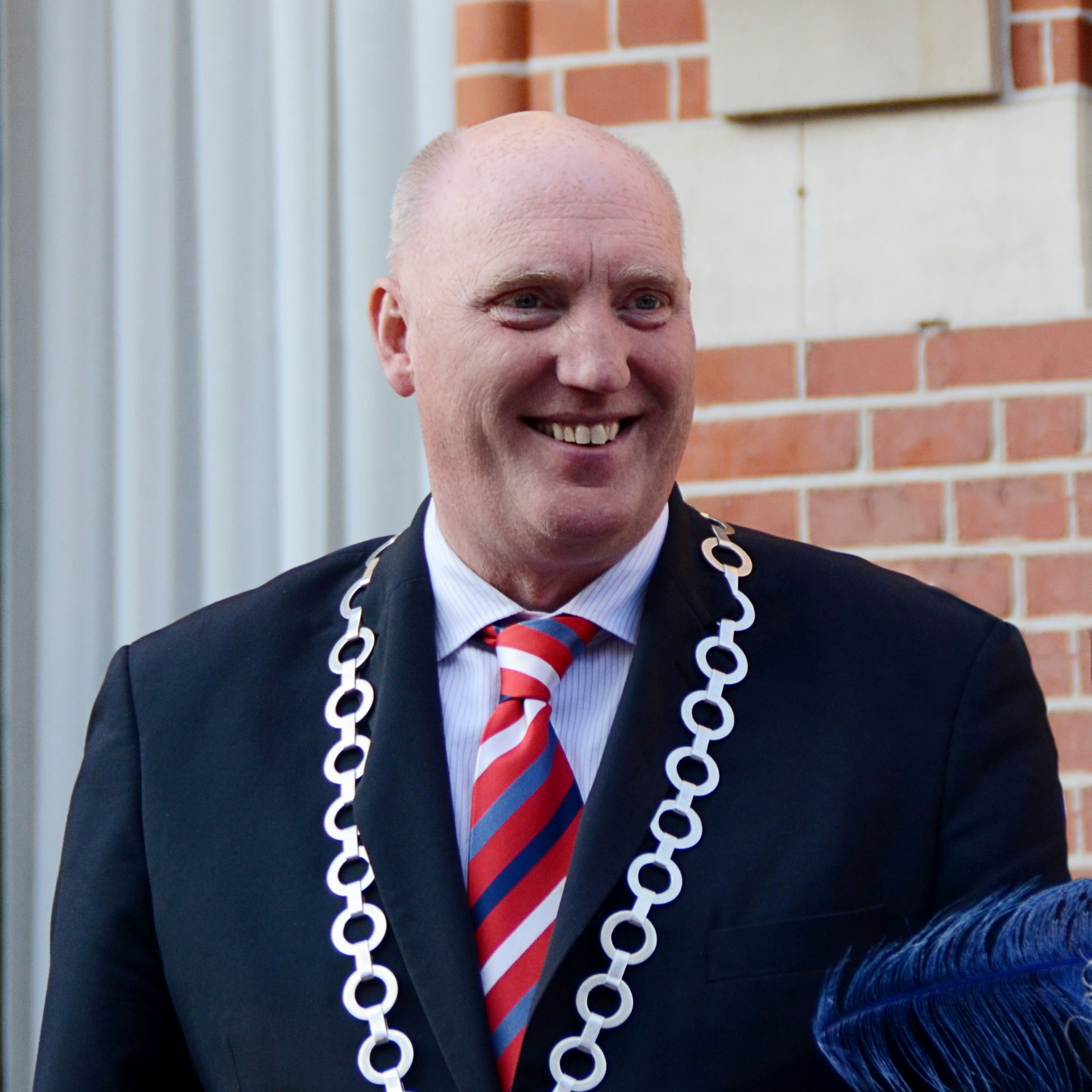
Pieter Smit

Pieter Smit (11 October 1963 – 10 April 2018) was a Dutch police officer and politician, belonging to the Democrats 66 (D66) party.

Smit was born in Delfzijl. He held a commanding position in the former Haaglanden police force before entering full-time into politics. He was elected into the municipal council of Zoetermeer in 1994 and became an alderman in 2006.

From 1 September 2010 until his death in April 2018, he was mayor of Oldambt. He was the first non-acting mayor after the establishment of this new Groningen municipality on 1 January 2010.

He also performed several ancillary functions, like commissioner of Groningen Airport Eelde.

Pieter Smit died suddenly of a cardiac arrest in his hometown Scheemda, aged 54.

== Naming ==
The Pieter Smit Bridge (a series of bridges) in the province of Groningen are named after him.

Political offices
Preceded by Martin Zijlstra (acting)	Mayor of Oldambt; 2010–2018	Succeeded by Cora Yfke Sikkema; Rika Pot (acting)
