= General Dutch Youth League =

Former communist youth movement in the Netherlands

ANJV symbol

The Algemeen Nederlands Jeugd Verbond (ANJV; English: General Dutch Youth League) was a political youth movement in the Netherlands. Founded in 1945, the ANJV was a nominally independent organization with the stated intention of uniting left-wing young people, but in practice operated as a front organization of the Communist Party of the Netherlands (CPN). Following the CPN's merger into GroenLinks in 1991, the ANJV continued as an independent group, centered in Amsterdam. In 2012, the remaining group sought to merge with DWARS, GroenLinks's youth. The ANJV's status after 2012 is unclear. The ANJV was a member of the World Federation of Democratic Youth.

== History ==
The predecessor of the ANJV was the Communistische Jeugd Holland.

The ANJV was founded on 15 June 1945, in the Concertgebouw, Amsterdam. In its first three years of its existence, the ANJV enjoyed significant popularity, numbering 15,000 members just after its founding in 1945, owing to its broad anti-fascist orientation and attempts by its leadership to unite left-wing youth under a single banner. Conflicts between communist and social democratic youth over the organisation's priorities, as well as the 1948 Czechoslovak coup d'état and growing anti-communist sentiment nationally led to an exodus of non-communist members from the ANJV from the late 1940s on and a decline in membership.

Growing anti-communist sentiment led to members of the ANJV, alongside those of the CPN and other communist mass organizations, were banned from government employment by the Drees government in 1951. The political fallout from the 1956 Soviet invasion of Hungary further contributed to the movement's marginalisation.

From the 1960s onward, members of the ANJV figured prominently in various popular activist groups, such the movements against American involvement in the Vietnam War and opposing the placement of nuclear weapons in Western Europe.

After the merger of the CPN into GroenLinks in 1991, the ANJV continued as an independent organization concentrated in Amsterdam. In 2012, the remaining ANJV decided to merge with DWARS, the youth organization of GroenLinks, though whether the merger has actually taken place remains unclear.

== Organization ==
Similar in organization to the East German Freie Deutsche Jugend, the ANJV was nominally an independent "progressive" youth organisation, but was ideologically heavily influenced by communism, and its leadership controlled by members of the Communistische Partij van Nederland (Communist Party of the Netherlands). This is as opposed to other political youth organisations in the Netherlands, such as the Jonge Socialisten or the JovD, which are directly related to the PvdA and the VVD, respectively.

The ANJV was made up of various local branches, of which the branch in Amsterdam was the largest. On the national level, a member congress was the highest authority nominally, but the ANJV's executive, which had close ties to the CPN, held the most power.

== Ideology ==
On paper, the General Dutch Youth League was a politically neutral organization, which sought to unite left-wing youth. In practice, the leadership of the CPN held a strong influence over the organization, and sought to use it to increase the influence of communism among a broader group of young people.

== See also ==
- Communist Youth Movement (Netherlands)
