= Newmancollege =

School in Breda, Netherlands

Newmancollege (or Newman College) is a comprehensive Roman Catholic secondary school in Breda, the Netherlands. It was established in 1959 as an HBS (Hogereburgerschool), and was merged with Gymnasium Ypelaar in 1973 and Mavo Hoge Vugt in 1991.

In 2005 it had around 1200 students in grades 1–6.

The school is named after the English theologian and convert to Catholicism Cardinal Newman (1801-1890).
