= Oldambtmeer =

- Location within Groningen (province)

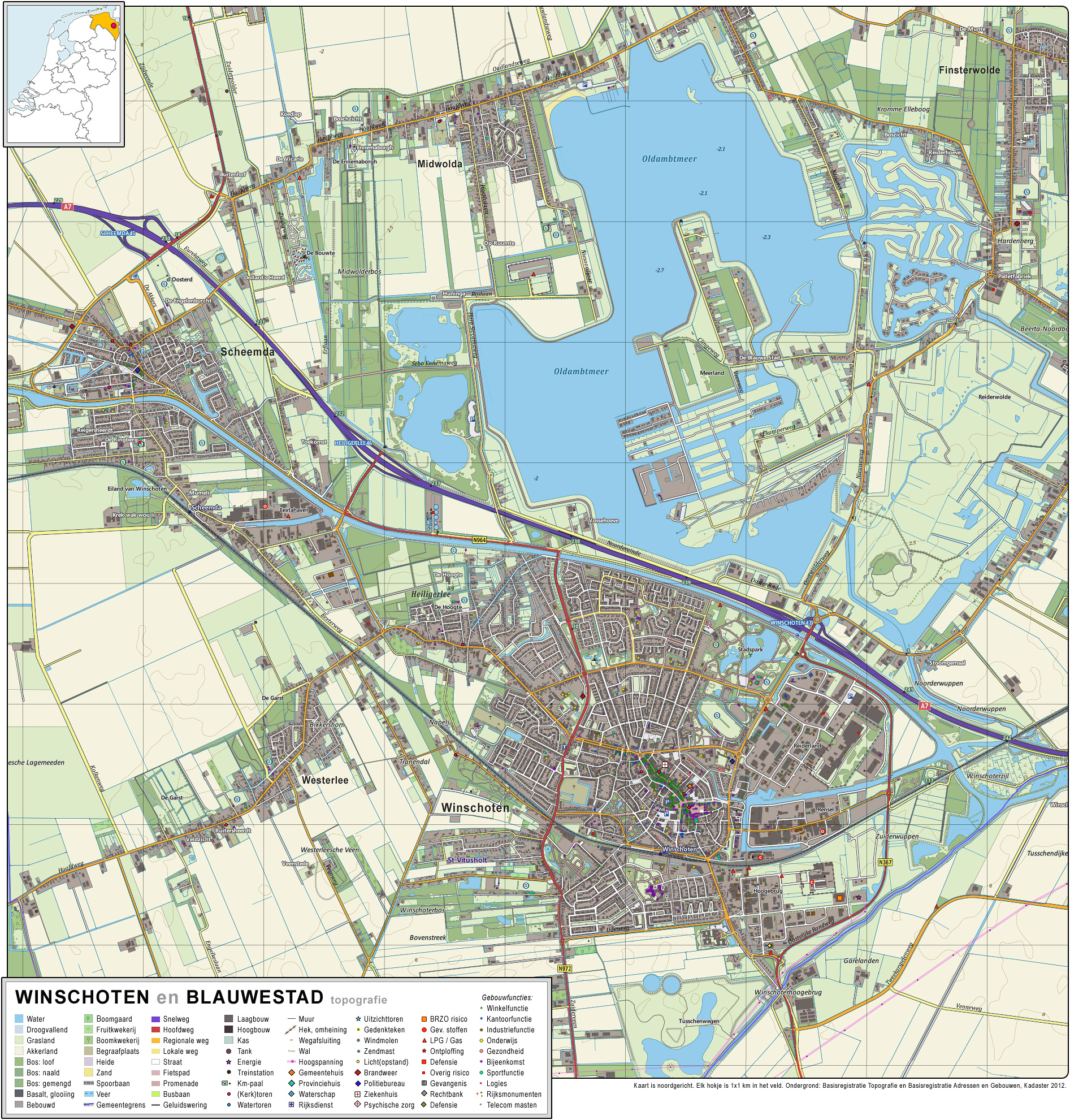
- Map of the Oldambtmeer and Winschoten
- Location: Oldambt, Netherlands
- Coordinates: 53.176°N 7.030°E

Oldambtmeer (Dutch pronunciation: [ˈɔldɑm(p)tˌmeːr]; English: Oldambt Lake) is an artificial lake of more than 800 hectares (ha) in the municipality of Oldambt in the Netherlands, created by flooding fallow land that had previously been reclaimed.
