= Midwolda =

- Village
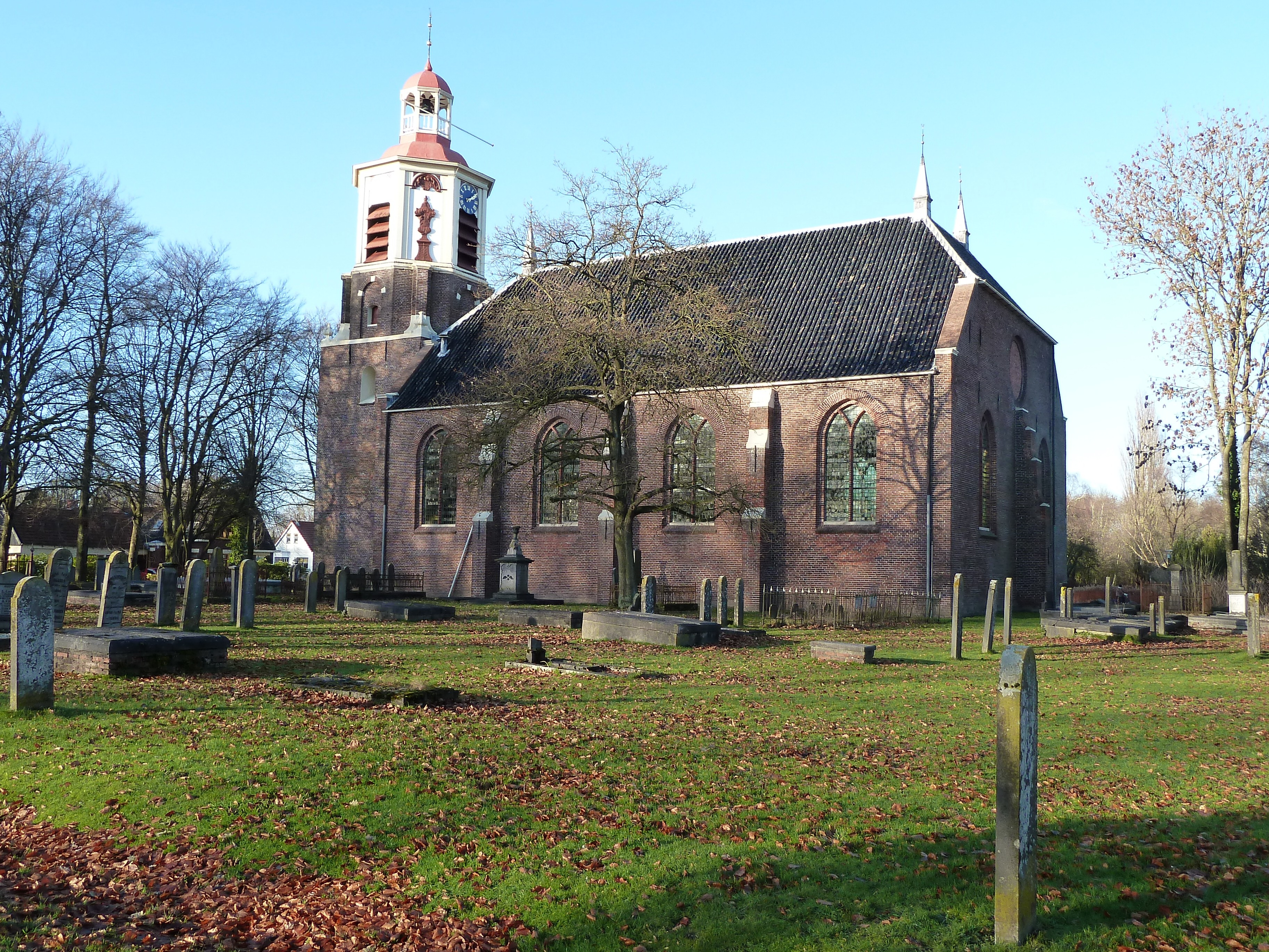
- Protestant Church in 2010

- Coat of arms

- Location of Midwolda in the province of Groningen
- Coordinates: 53°11′34″N 7°0′58″E
- Country: Netherlands
- Province: Groningen
- Municipality: Oldambt

Area
  - Total: 33.34 km^{2} (12.87 sq mi)
- Elevation: −0.4 m (−1.3 ft)

Population (2021)
  - Total: 2,120
  - Density: 63.6/km^{2} (165/sq mi)
- Time zone: UTC+1 (CET)
  - Summer (DST): UTC+2 (CEST)
- Postal code: 9681 & 9685
- Dialing code: 0597

Midwolda (Dutch pronunciation: [mɪtˈʋɔldaː]) is a village in the Dutch province of Groningen. It is located in the municipality of Oldambt, about 7 km northwest of Winschoten.

Midwolda was a separate municipality until 1990, when it was merged with Scheemda.

== History ==
The village was first mentioned in 1282 as de Middewalda, and means middle woods. Midwolda is a road village which developed in the Middle Ages at the edge of the former peninsula of Winschoten. The All Saints' Flood of 1570 caused an extension of the Dollart, and the village moved to the south near the dike constructed in 1565. The old church remained behind, however the tower collapsed in 1667, and the church was demolished in 1738.

The current Dutch Reformed church was built between 1738 and 1740, and has a tower from 1708. The borg Ennemaborg might date from before 1391. It is surrounded by a moat and received its current shape in 1681.

Midwolda was home to 1,674 people in 1840. It was independent municipality until 1990 when it was merged with Scheemda. Since 2010, it is part of Oldambt.

== Gallery ==
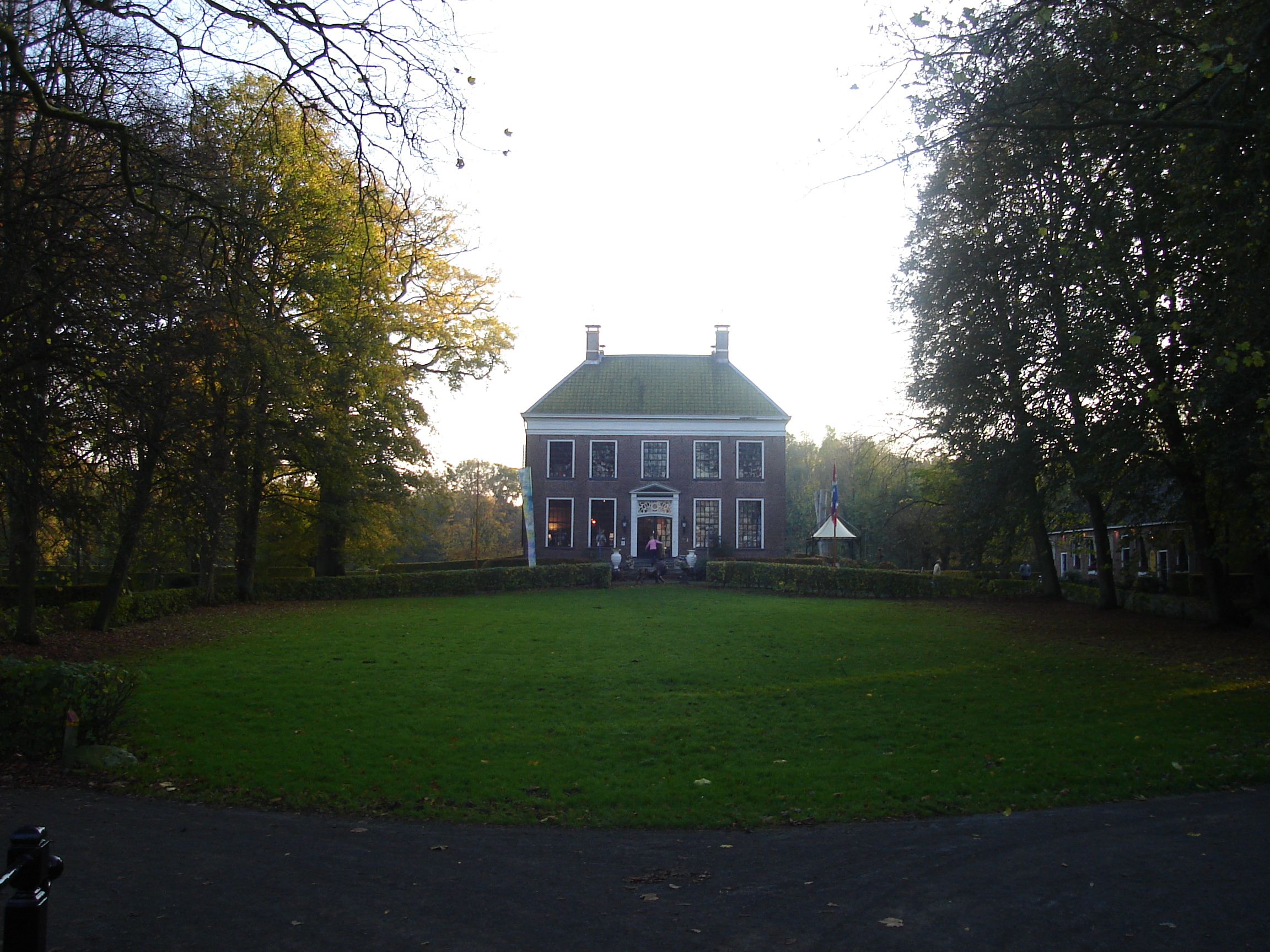
Mansion Ennemaborg

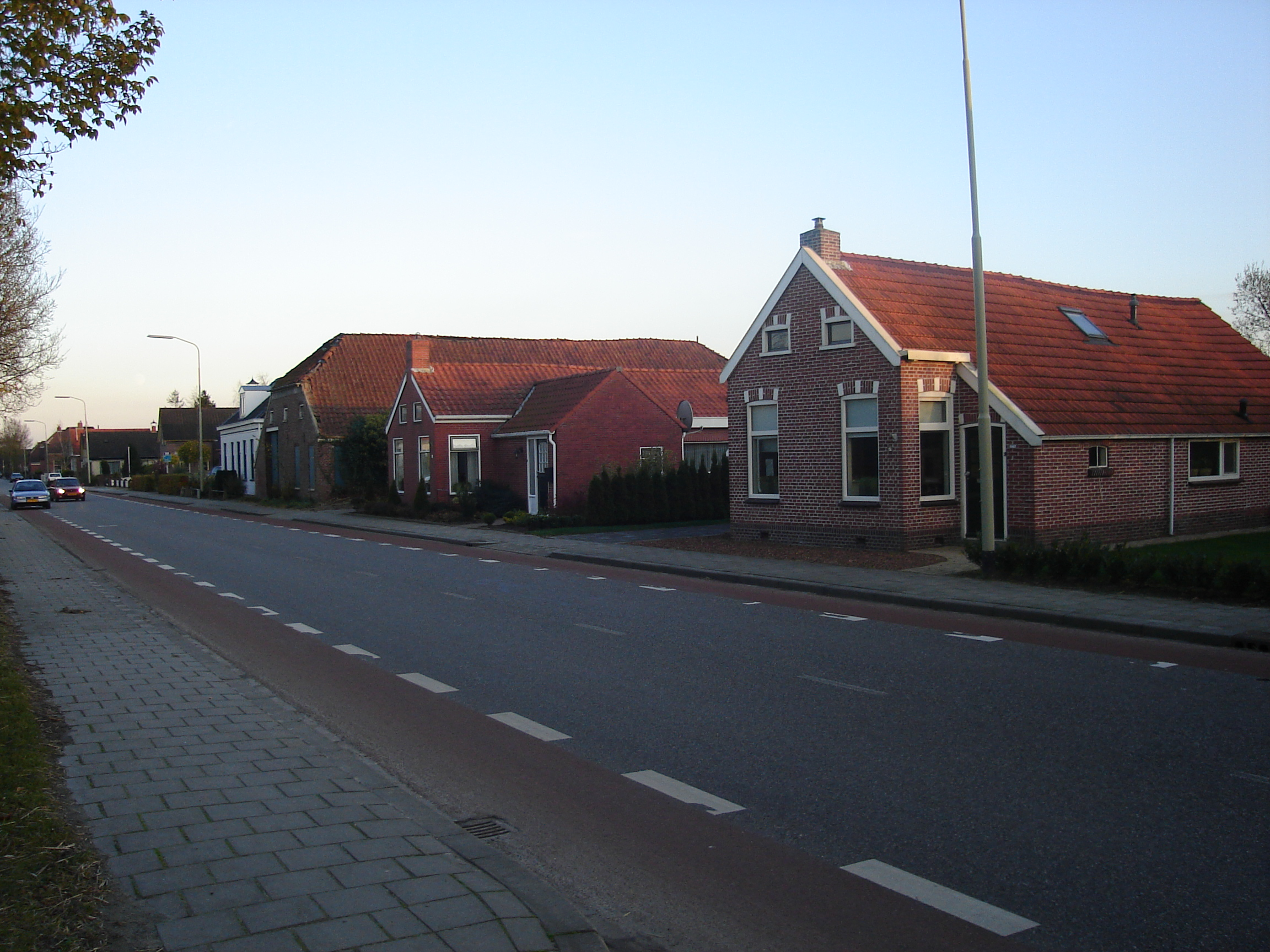
Main street

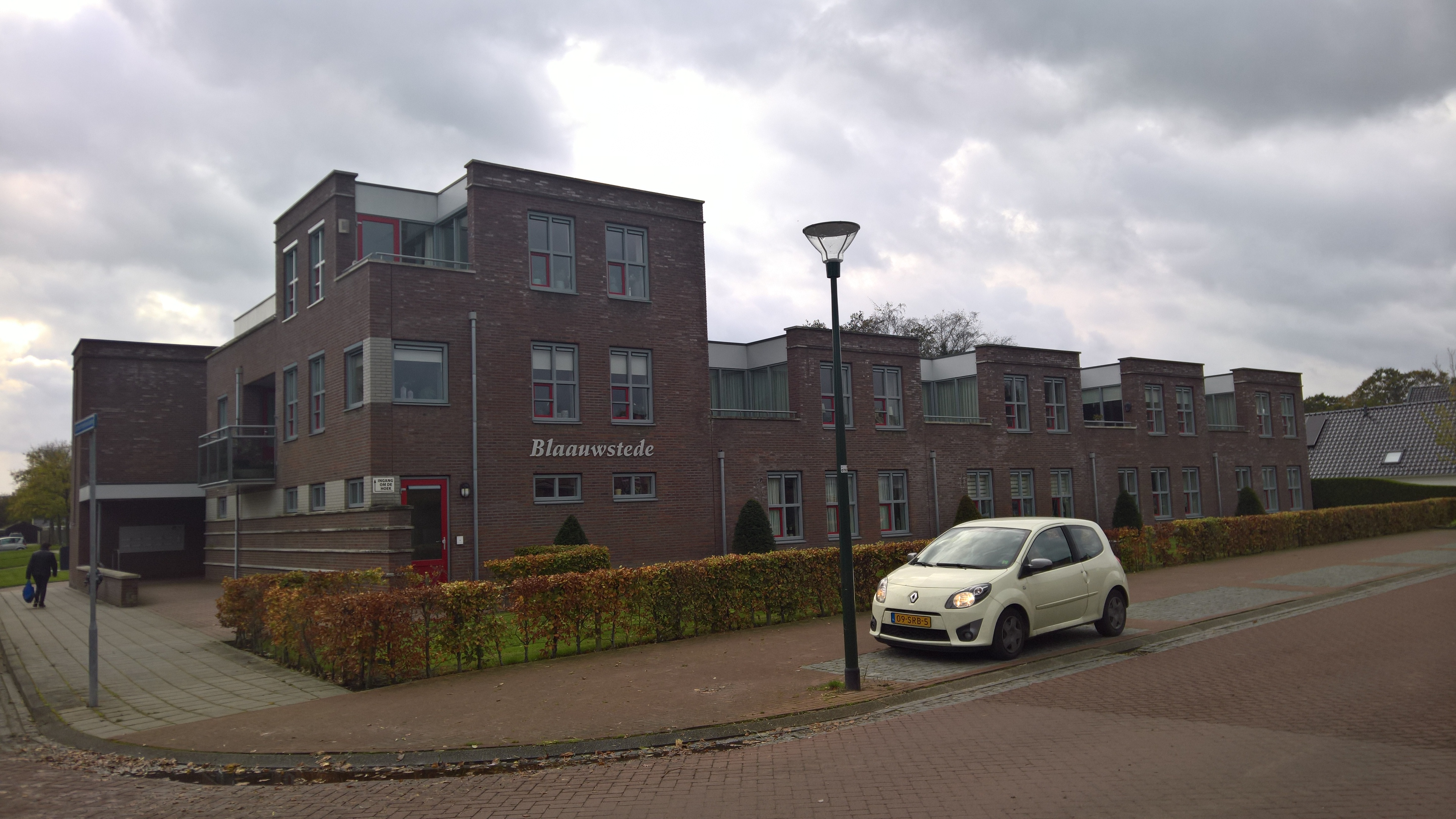
Retirement home Blaauwstede

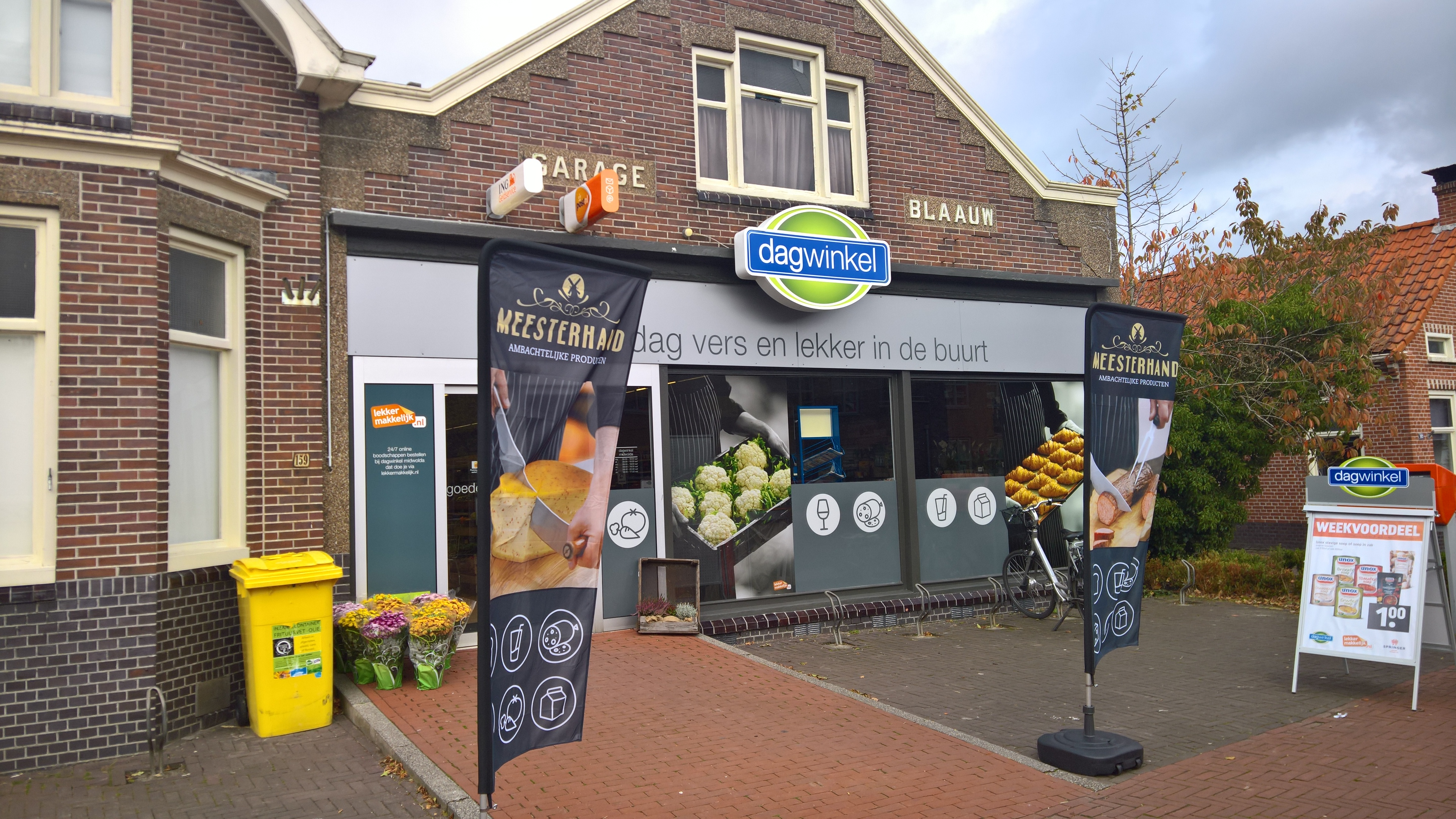
Convenience store in Midwolda
