= Municipal reorganizations in the Netherlands =

Administrative mergers and boundary changes in Dutch municipalities

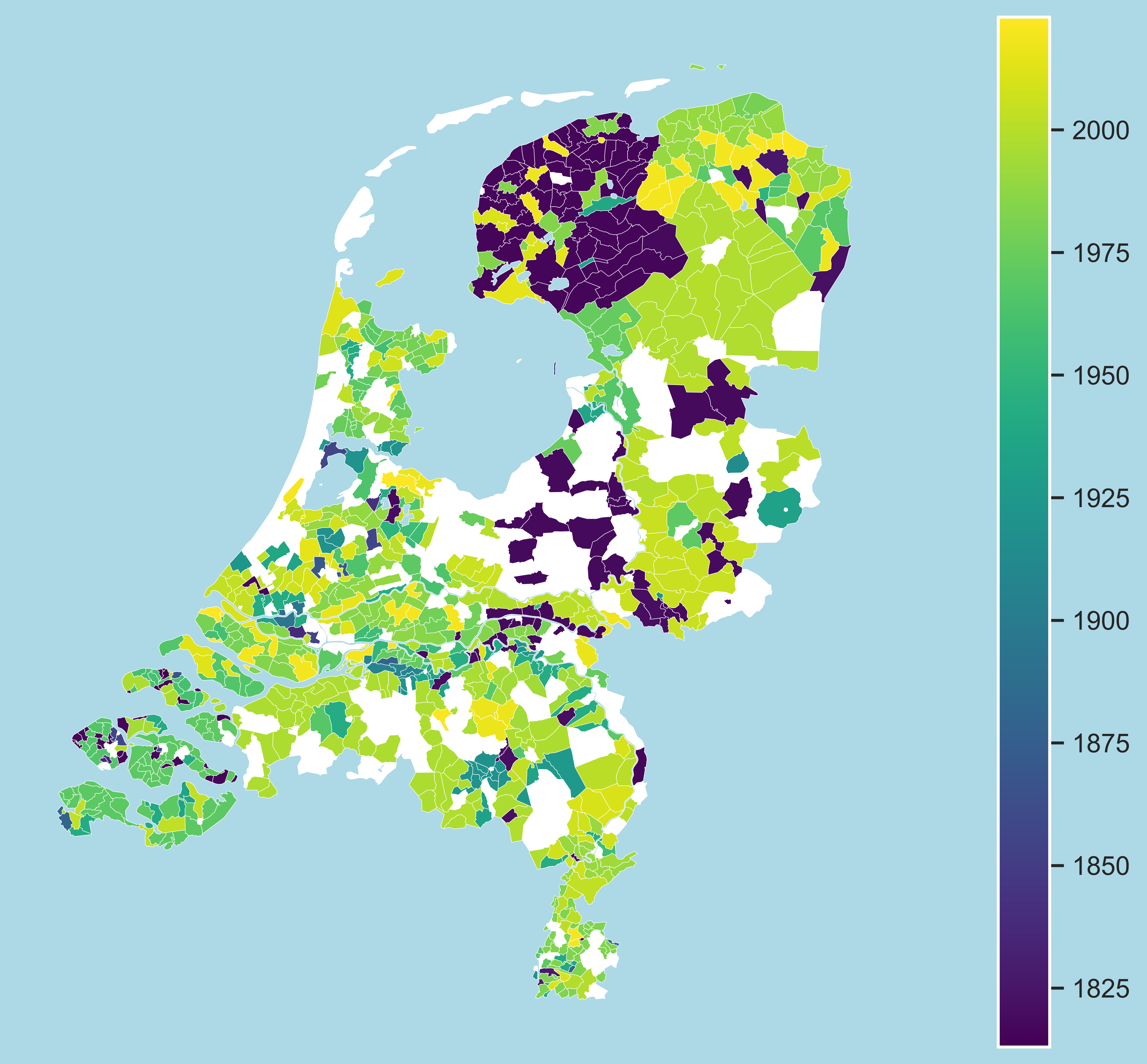
Map of Dutch municipalities in 1812, coloured on the basis of the year of abolishment.

The history of municipal reorganizations in the Netherlands dates back to the early nineteenth century. These reorganizations have mainly been driven by the goal of ensuring a minimum size for municipalities in order to enhance administrative capacity, but they have also regularly occurred due to the growth of settlements. Initially, the number of reorganizations was limited. From the 1970s onward, however, their number increased significantly, as decentralization demanded greater administrative capacity from municipalities. Consequently, the number of municipalities declined from 1,209 in 1851 to 342 in 2023.

== Background ==
=== Definition ===
The Wet algemene regels herindeling (General Rules for Reorganization Act), introduced in 1984, distinguishes between three types of municipal reorganizations:

- In a regular merger, all involved municipalities are dissolved and a new one is created.
- In a light merger, not all involved municipalities are dissolved; the dissolved municipalities are integrated into those that remain.
- In a boundary change, no municipalities are dissolved, but municipal borders are adjusted in such a way that the population of at least one involved municipality increases or decreases by at least 10%.

Changes to municipal boundaries that do not involve a minimum 10% population increase or decrease are referred to as grenscorrecties (border corrections) and fall outside the scope of the Act.

=== History ===
The constitutional concept of a municipality was first introduced in the Netherlands on 1 May 1798, by the Staatsregeling voor het Bataafsche Volk (Constitution for the Batavian People). In 1811, when the Netherlands was part of the First French Empire, a minimum of 500 inhabitants was set for a municipality, with an ideal of 2,000 residents. Despite a desire to consolidate municipalities, systematic mergers did not succeed in the Dutch territories. The Municipalities Act of 1851 introduced a minimum of 25 eligible voters per municipality, which at the time meant only tax-paying men. Within ten years, 74 municipalities disappeared.

From the 1970s onward, the number of municipal reorganizations rapidly increased. This shift was part of a broader decentralization policy by the Dutch government, which delegated responsibilities to municipalities. Smaller municipalities were seen as lacking the administrative strength to fulfill these new duties, prompting widespread consolidation. In the early 1980s, a population of at least 5,000 residents was considered the benchmark for municipal reorganizations. In the 1990s, additional motives emerged. Debates around central municipalities brought new attention to urban and regional infrastructure and urban planning. During the second Kok cabinet in the late 1990s, the target minimum population was raised to 25,000 residents.

During the 2002 Dutch general election, Pim Fortuyn advocated abolishing forced municipal mergers. Influenced by his party (LPF), the first Balkenende cabinet decided to no longer impose reorganizations from the top down. Several planned mergers were canceled, with the exception of the one in the Achterhoek region. Nonetheless, this shift in policy during the Balkenende cabinets (2002–2010) did not significantly reduce the number of municipal mergers.

Under the second Rutte cabinet (2012–2017), another wave of decentralization occurred, especially in the social domain. At that time, Minister of the Interior Ronald Plasterk even called for a minimum of 100,000 residents per municipality, although he later softened this position.

=== Public Support ===
Merging municipalities is often unpopular among residents, particularly those from smaller municipalities being absorbed into larger ones. In the past, public opinion was ignored, even in referendums. One notable example is the reorganization of Vleuten-De Meern into the municipality of Utrecht. A local referendum held in 1996 showed 98% opposition, with a turnout of 83%, yet the merger still went ahead on 1 January 2001.

Although current policy stipulates that reorganizations should only occur with the consent of the municipalities involved, it can still happen against a municipality’s will—especially when a small municipality is deemed to lack sufficient administrative capacity. There are ongoing discussions about forcibly merging suburban municipalities in the Randstad region (such as Diemen, Rijswijk, or Schiedam) with larger cities.

=== Consequences ===
A 2014 study by the Center for Research on the Economics of Local Government (Centrum voor onderzoek van de economie van de lagere overheden; Coelo) found that municipal mergers did not result in cost savings. Additionally, voter turnout in local elections declines by an average of 2.5% following a merger.
