= 2002 Dutch municipal elections =

- 6 March 2002
- Turnout: 56.74%

Municipal elections were held on 6 March 2002 in municipalities in the Netherlands. This election determined the composition of the municipal councils for the following four years.

== Results ==
Party	Votes	%
Local parties	1,611,141	25.53
Christian Democratic Appeal	1,319,718	20.92
Labour Party	1,031,718	16.35
People's Party for Freedom and Democracy	1,017,927	16.13
GroenLinks	190,059	3.01
Democrats 66	270,532	4.29
Christian Union	270,532	4.29
Socialist Party	180,698	2.86
Local progressive groups	178,443	2.83
Reformed Political Party	107,756	1.71
Local confessional groups	100,817	1.60
Other parties	30,447	0.48
Total	6,309,788	100.00
Valid votes	6,309,788	99.72
Invalid/blank votes	17,715	0.28
Total votes	6,327,503	100.00
Registered voters/turnout	11,151,427	56.74
Source: Kiesraad, DNPP
