= 2010 Dutch municipal elections =

- 3 March 2010

Municipal elections were held on Wednesday 3 March 2010 in most municipalities in the Netherlands. This election determined the composition of the municipal councils for the following four years. The elections were held a few weeks after the fall of the Fourth Balkenende cabinet.

Nearly 24% of the vote went to local parties and independent candidates, more than any national political party. The Labour Party remained the most popular party overall, despite a significant decline in their vote share. Support for the CDA also decreased, while the VVD made moderate gains and Democrats 66 nearly doubled their support. The CDA held the most seats of any party, mainly due to its higher level of support in rural areas. The Party for Freedom only contested the cities of Almere and The Hague, where it became the largest and second-largest party respectively.

== Results ==
A total of 8,654 seats in 392 municipalities were up for election:

Party	Votes	%	Seats
Local parties and independents	1,559,658	23.70	2,277
Labour Party	1,035,948	15.74	1,251
People's Party for Freedom and Democracy	1,031,983	15.68	1,432
Christian Democratic Appeal	975,388	14.82	1,531
Democrats 66	531,760	8.08	541
GroenLinks	442,925	6.73	436
Socialist Party	273,594	4.16	250
Christian Union	247,648	3.76	331
Reformed Political Party	116,371	1.77	197
Trots op Nederland	81,877	1.24	61
Christian Union – Reformed Political Party	68,163	1.04	90
Party for Freedom	50,529	0.77	17
PvdA–GL	37,208	0.57	62
Frisian National Party	26,841	0.41	52
PvdA–GL–D66	23,400	0.36	44
Party for the Animals	19,717	0.30	6
United Pensioners Party	14,234	0.22	12
GL–D66	13,557	0.21	24
PvdA–D66	6,803	0.10	11
PvdA–GL–D66–Socialist Party	6,533	0.10	15
VVD–D66	5,159	0.08	11
Dutch Muslim Party	3,266	0.05	0
The Greens	2,911	0.04	0
New Communist Party–NCPN	2,177	0.03	3
Party for Mind and Spirit	1,369	0.02	0
Dutch Whistleblowers' Party	1,336	0.02	0
Dutch Peoples' Union	975	0.01	0
Total	6,581,330	100.00	8,654
