= 2014 Dutch municipal elections =

| ← 2010 | 19 March 2014 | 2018 → |

Municipal elections were held on 19 March 2014 in most municipalities in the Netherlands. This election determines the composition of the municipal councils for the following four years.

== Background ==
Municipal elections are, unless exempted by an act of parliament, held every fourth year in the Netherlands as prescribed by the constitution. The previous municipal elections were held on 3 March 2010, the elections were originally planned for 5 March 2014. Because this date coincided with Ash Wednesday, the elections were rescheduled to 19 March 2014. The elections were held in all municipalities, except those that were amalgamated in 2013 and 2014 or were intended to amalgamate in 2015. Goeree-Overflakkee, Molenwaard and Schagen elected their councils late 2012; Alphen aan den Rijn, De Friese Meren, Heerenveen and Leeuwarden in November 2013; and 16 other municipalities will be involved in amalgamation and will have their elections in November 2014. There was some confusion among voters in these municipalities about these alternative dates.

In the 2010 elections, local parties got 24% of the vote, with national parties taking most of the remaining seats. Since then a general election was held in 2012 for the House of Representatives. In this election, the People's Party for Freedom and Democracy and Labour Party won a combined 79 out of 150 seats and formed a coalition government. These municipal elections were the first elections in the Netherlands since the new cabinet was formed.

== Results ==
Local parties won 30% of the votes. The Christian Democratic Appeal became the largest party nationally, earning 14% of the votes. D66 and SP also saw significant rises compared to the 2010 elections, getting 12% and 7% respectively. VVD, although still ranked third nationwide, lost significantly compared to the 2010 elections, winning 12% of the votes. The undisputed loser of the elections, however, was the PvdA, getting 10% of the votes and losing its plurality in Amsterdam, Rotterdam and The Hague.

| Party | % Votes | % Seats | Seats |
|---|---|---|---|
| Local parties | 29.7% | 33.3% | 2,807 |
| Christen-Democratisch Appèl (CDA) | 14.3% | 17.7% | 1,495 |
| Volkspartij voor Vrijheid en Democratie (VVD) | 11.9% | 12.7% | 1,075 |
| Democraten 66 (D66) | 11.8% | 9.6% | 809 |
| Partij van de Arbeid (PvdA) | 10.2% | 9.5% | 799 |
| Socialistische Partij (SP) | 6.5% | 5.2% | 443 |
| combination ChristenUnie-Staatkundig Gereformeerde Partij (CU-SGP) | 7.0% | 7.8% | 663 |
| GroenLinks (GL) | 5.2% | 4.0% | 335 |
| Partij voor de Vrijheid (PVV) | 0.2% | 0.2% | 16 |
| Partij voor de Dieren (PvdD) | 0.1% | 0.1% | 12 |
| Total | - | 100.00% | 8,454 |

The election results in the largest cities are as following:

| City | VVD | PvdA | PVV | CDA | SP | D66 | GL | Local | Other |
|---|---|---|---|---|---|---|---|---|---|
| Amsterdam | 6 | 10 | - | 1 | 6 | 14 | 6 | 1 | 0 |
| Rotterdam | 3 | 8 | - | 3 | 5 | 6 | 2 | 16 | 2 |
| The Hague | 4 | 6 | 7 | 3 | 2 | 8 | 2 | 10 | 0 |
| Utrecht | 5 | 5 | - | 3 | 4 | 13 | 9 | 3 | 3 |

== Aftermath ==
Geert Wilders's speech after the elections was widely seen as controversial because he led a chant at a rally after municipal elections last week, asking supporters in The Hague: "Do you want more or fewer Moroccans in this city and in the Netherlands?" The crowd chanted: "Fewer! Fewer! Fewer!", to which Wilders responded: "We'll take care of that.".
