= Oostwold =

Oostwold may refer to:

- Oostwold, Leek, a village in the municipality of Leek, province of Groningen in the Netherlands
- Oostwold, Oldambt, a village in the municipality of Oldambt, province of Groningen in the Netherlands
- Oostwold Airport, near Winschoten, province of Groningen in the Netherlands
