= Scheemda =

- Village
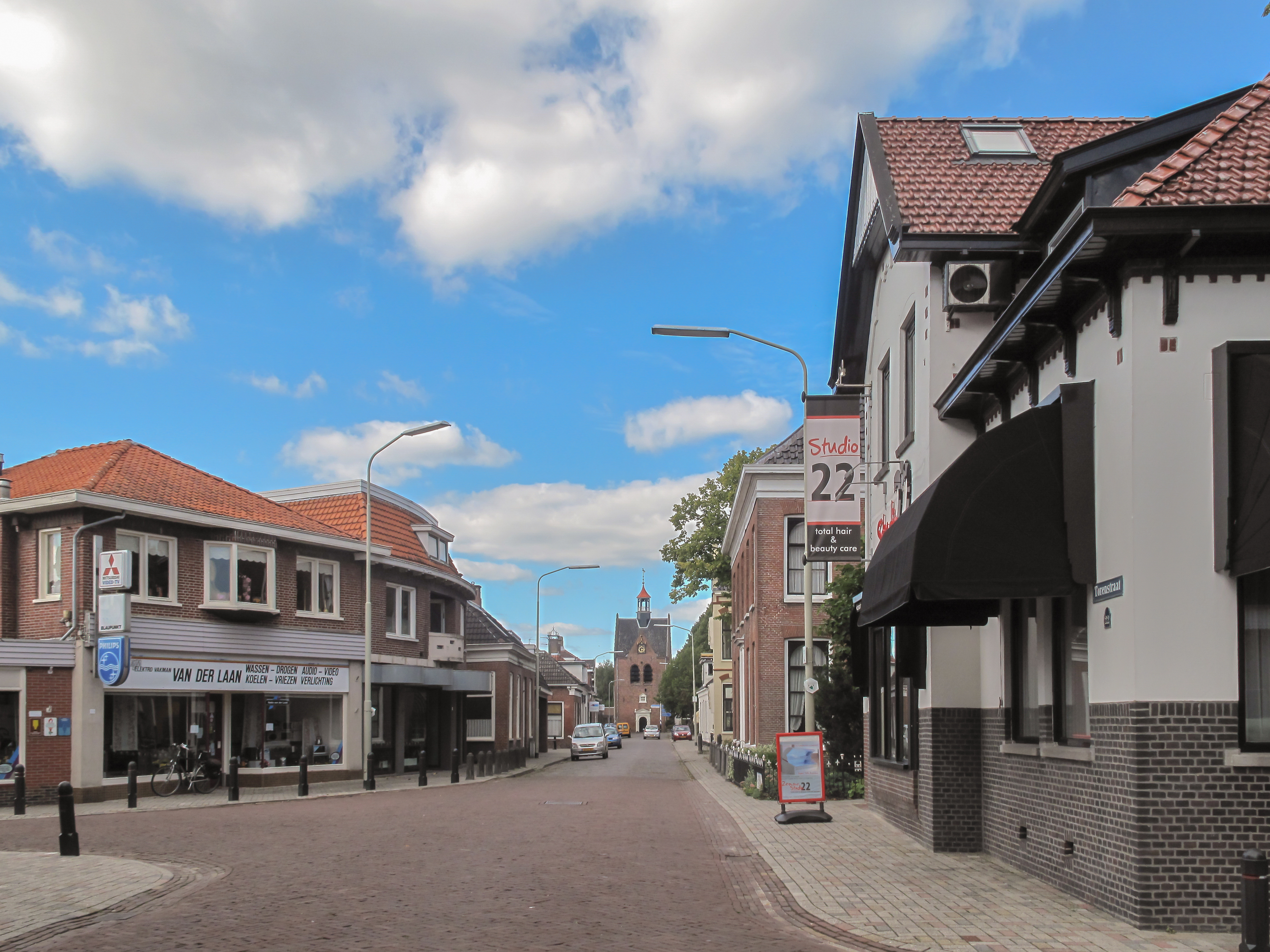
- Torenstraat in 2012

- Flag Coat of arms

- Location in Groningen

- Location of Scheemda in the province of Groningen
- Coordinates: 53°10′N 6°58′E
- Country: Netherlands
- Province: Groningen
- Municipality: Oldambt

Area (2012)
  - Total: 225 ha (560 acres)
  - Land: 220 ha (540 acres)
  - Water: 5 ha (12 acres)

Population (2023)
  - Total: 5,085
  - Density: 762/km^{2} (1,970/sq mi)
- Time zone: UTC+1 (CET)
  - Summer (DST): UTC+2 (CEST)

Scheemda (Dutch pronunciation: [ˈsxeːmdaː]) is a village with a population of 5,085 in the municipality of Oldambt in the province of Groningen in the Netherlands. Scheemda was a separate municipality until 2010, when it merged with Reiderland and Winschoten to form the municipality of Oldambt.

== History ==
Until 2010, Scheemda was a separate municipality with the population centers Heiligerlee, Midwolda, Nieuw-Scheemda, Nieuwolda, Oostwold, Scheemda, 't Waar and Westerlee. On 1 January 2010, the municipality merged into Oldambt.

== Transportation ==
The Scheemda railway station was opened in 1868 and has train services to Zuidbroek and Groningen in the west, and Winschoten, Bad Nieuweschans, and Leer (Germany) in the east.

== Notable people ==
- Pieter Smit (1963–2018), mayor of Oldambt (2010–2018), lived and died here.

== Gallery ==
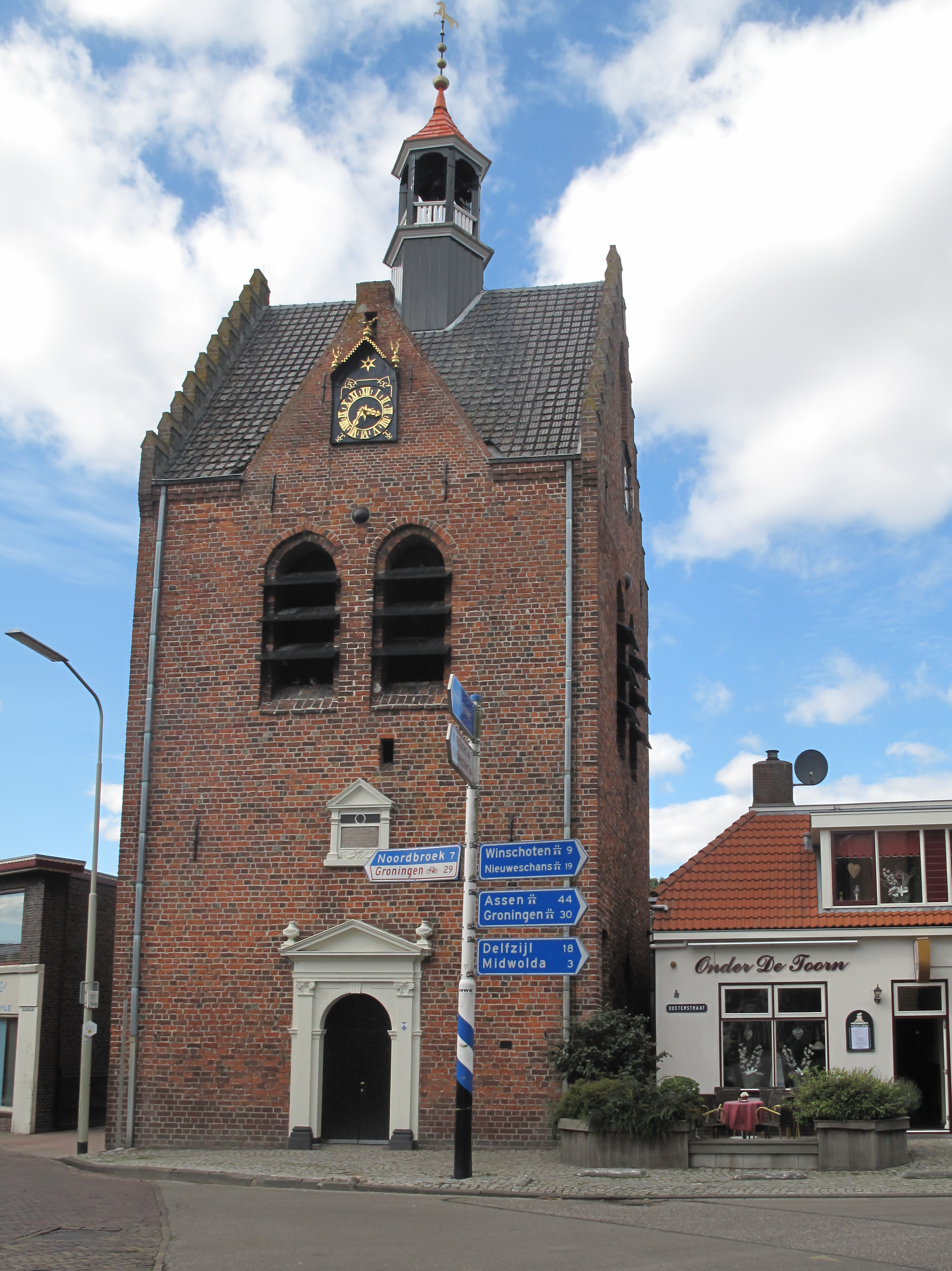
Scheemda, church tower

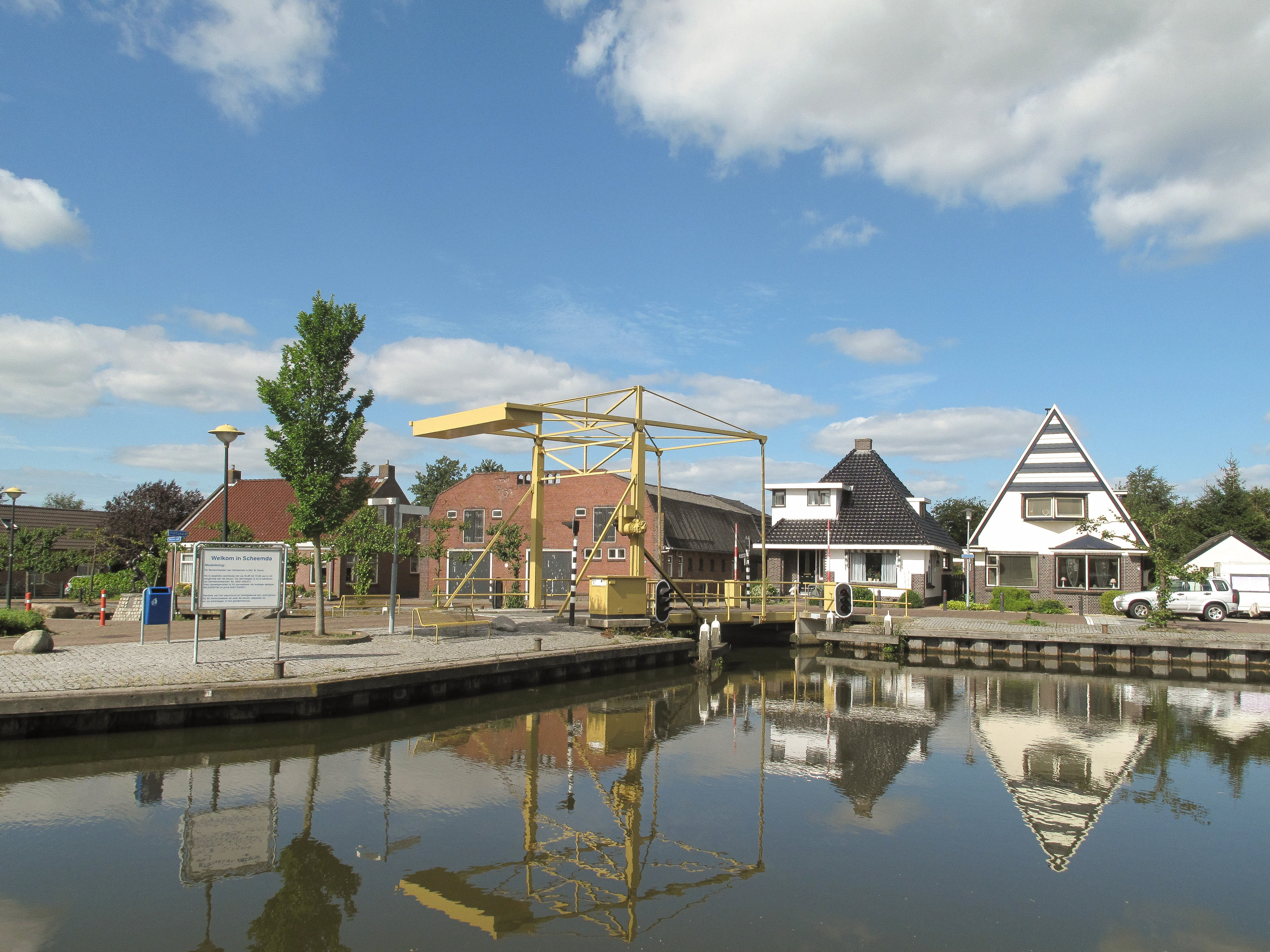
Scheemda, drawing bridge in the street

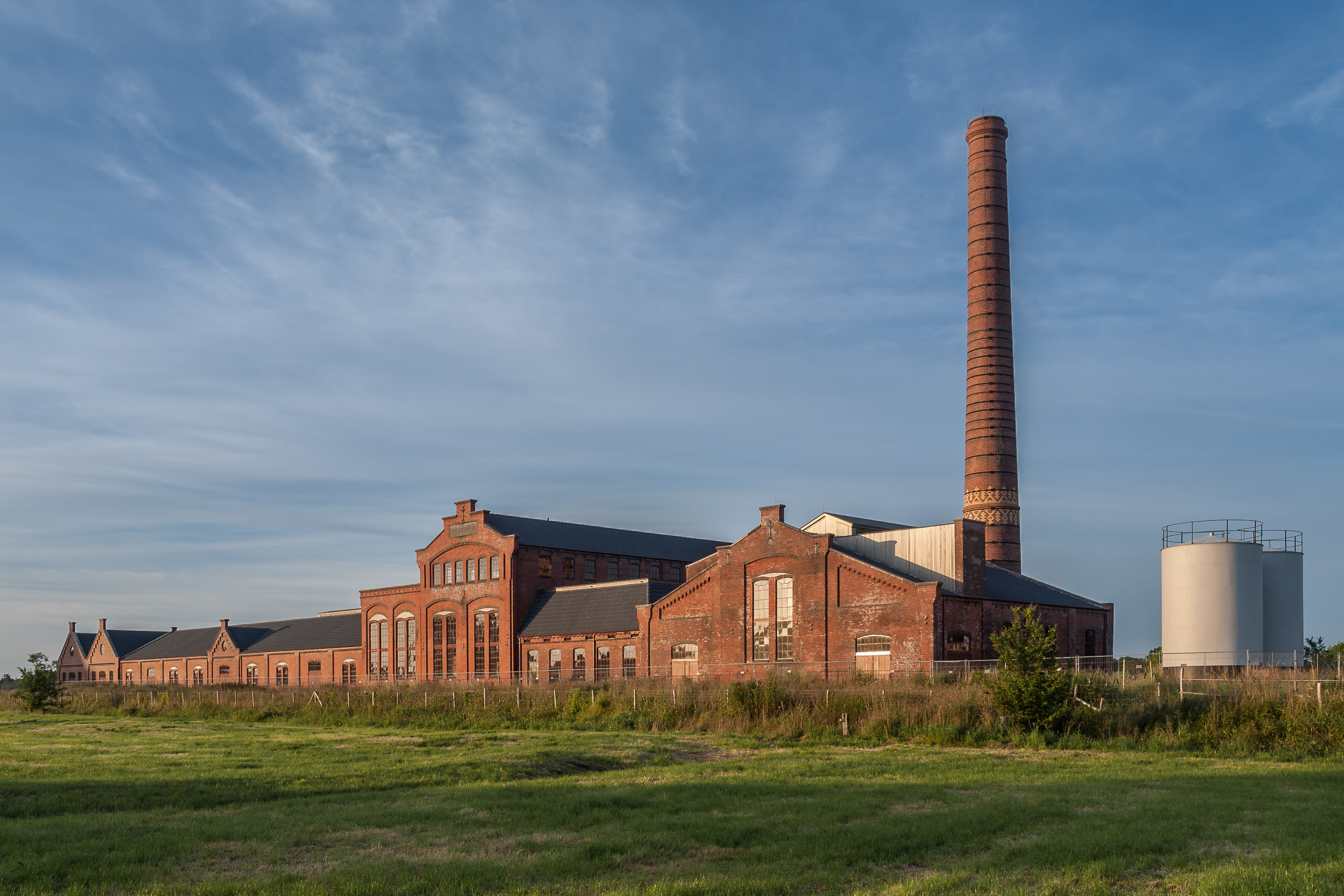
Cardboard factory De Toekomst II (The Future II)

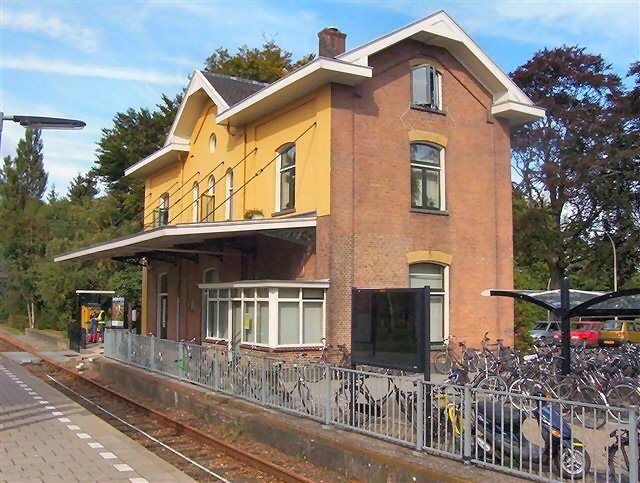
Scheemda railway station
