= 't Waar =

- Village
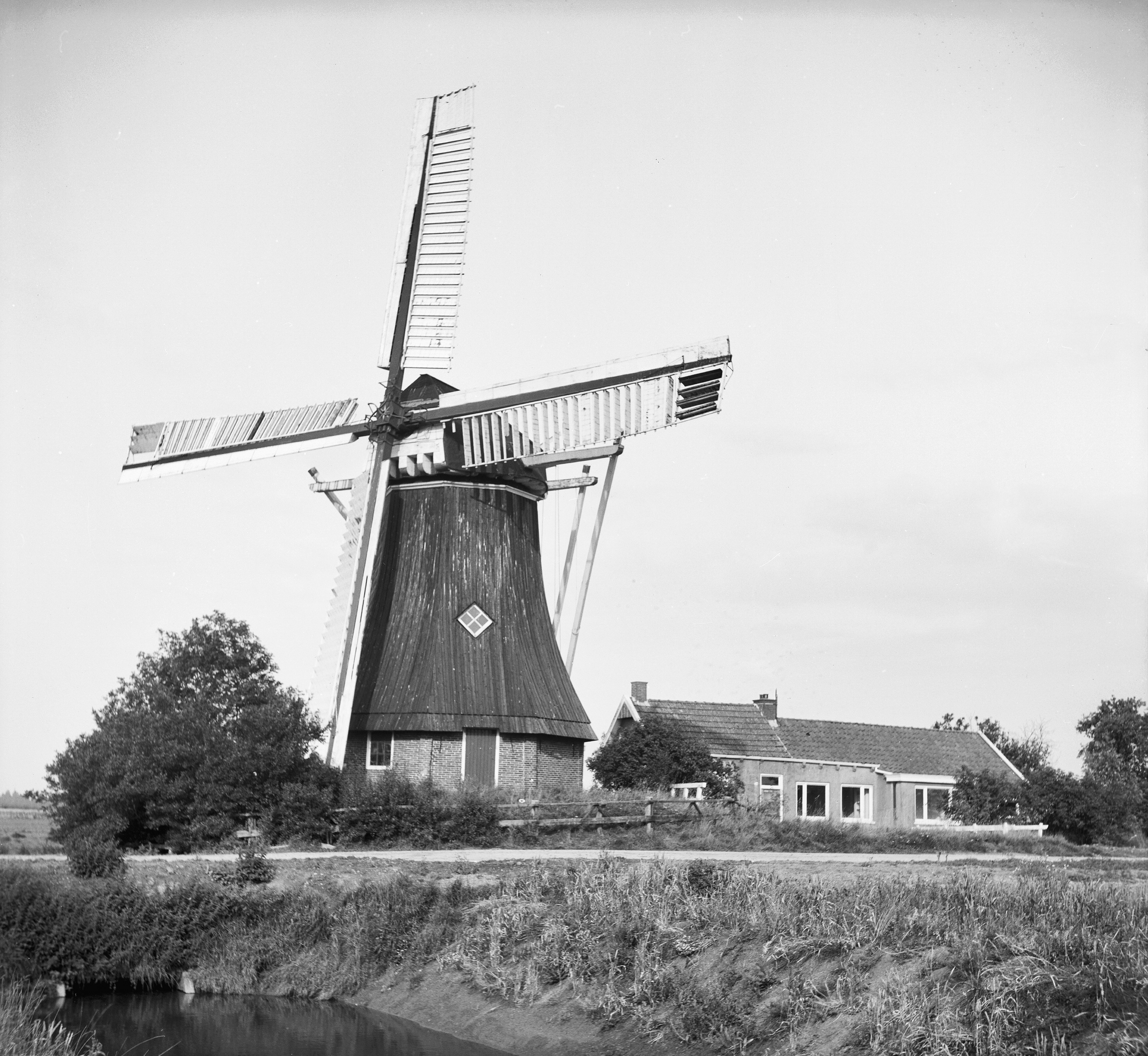
- Windmill De Dellen in 1977

- Location of 't Waar in the province of Groningen 't Waar (Netherlands)
- Coordinates: 53°13′31″N 6°57′7″E
- Country: Netherlands
- Province: Groningen
- Municipality: Oldambt

Area
  - Total: 0.49 km^{2} (0.19 sq mi)
- Elevation: 0.1 m (0.33 ft)

Population (2021)
  - Total: 115
  - Density: 230/km^{2} (610/sq mi)
- Time zone: UTC+1 (CET)
  - Summer (DST): UTC+2 (CEST)
- Postal code: 9942
- Dialing code: 0598

't Waar (Dutch pronunciation: [ət ˈʋaːr]) is a village in the province of Groningen in the Netherlands. It is located in the municipality of Oldambt, just north of the village of Nieuw-Scheemda.

== History ==
The villages was first mentioned in 1781 as 't Waar, and means sluice. It refers to a sluice constructed in 1622 in the Termunterzijldiep to regulate the water flow.

't Waar was home to 451 people in 1840. Between 1910 and 1934, there was a joint railway station with Nieuw-Scheemda on the Zuidbroek to Delfzijl railway line. On 15 April 1945, the village celebrate its liberation when German soldiers threw hand grenades into the crowd killing five civilians and one Polish soldier. In 1995, a memorial was placed on the site.

't Waar was part of the municipality of Scheemda until 1990 when it became part of Nieuwolda. Since 2010, it is part of Oldambt.
