= Nieuw-Scheemda =

- Village
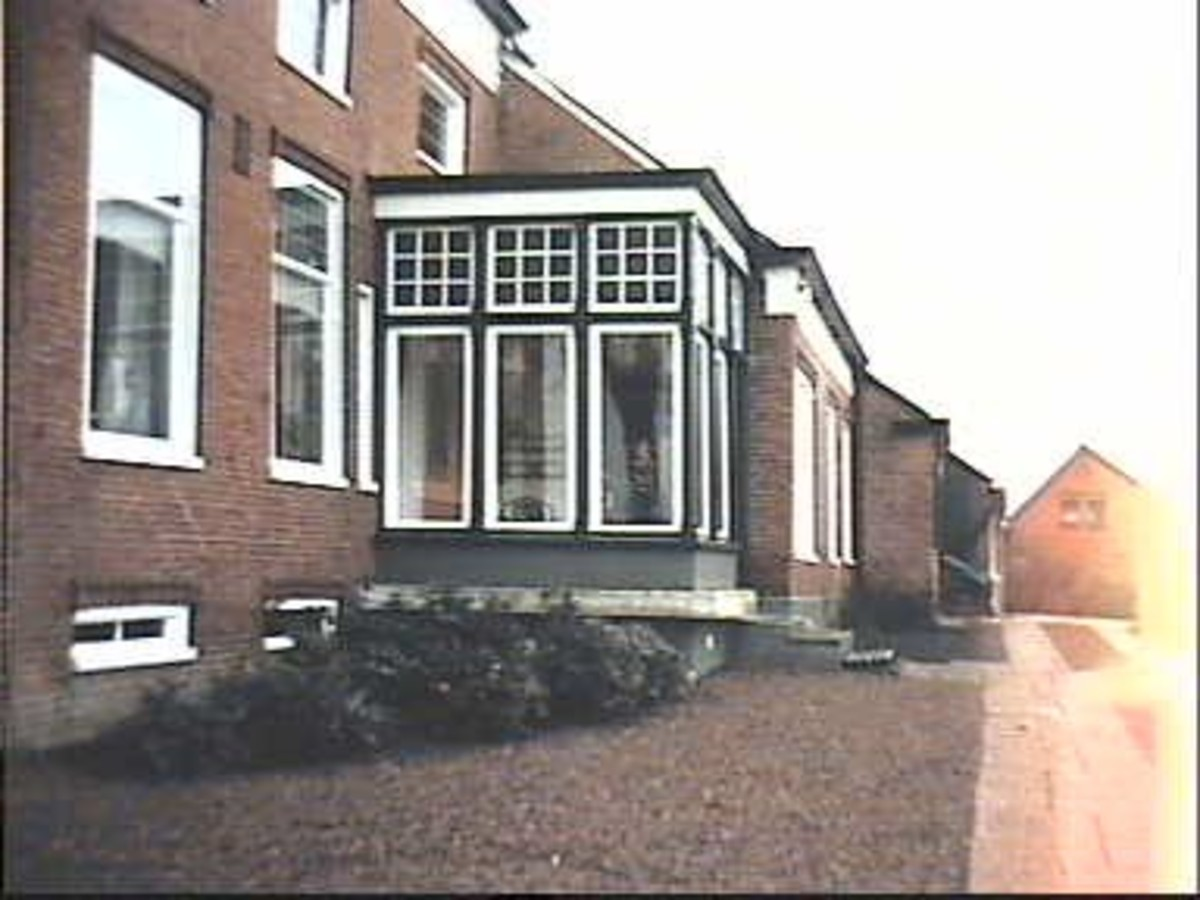
- Sunroom at a farm in Nieuw-Scheemda

- Location in province of Groningen in the Netherlands Nieuw-Scheemda (Netherlands)
- Coordinates: 53.2094°N 6.9428°E
- Country: Netherlands
- Province: Groningen
- Municipality: Oldambt
- Established: 1659

Area
  - Total: 0.68 km^{2} (0.26 sq mi)
- Elevation: 0 m (0 ft)

Population (2021)
  - Total: 235
  - Density: 350/km^{2} (900/sq mi)
- Time zone: UTC+1 (CET)
  - Summer (DST): UTC+2 (CEST)
- Postal code: 9943
- Dialing code: 0597
- Website: Nieuw-scheemda.nl

Nieuw-Scheemda (also: Scheemderhamrik; Gronings: Nij Scheemte) is a village in the Dutch province of Groningen. It is a part of the municipality of Oldambt. The village has grown together with 't Waar, however both are considered separate entities even though they share facilities.

== History ==
Nieuw-Scheemda was established in 1659 as a daughter settlement of Scheemda. In 1545, a first dike was built along the Dollart. In 1597, a second dike was constructed which resulted in more than 1,000 hectares (2,500 acres) of additional land to be cultivated. Nieuw-Scheemda is located in the reclaimed land. In 1661, the church of the village was constructed.

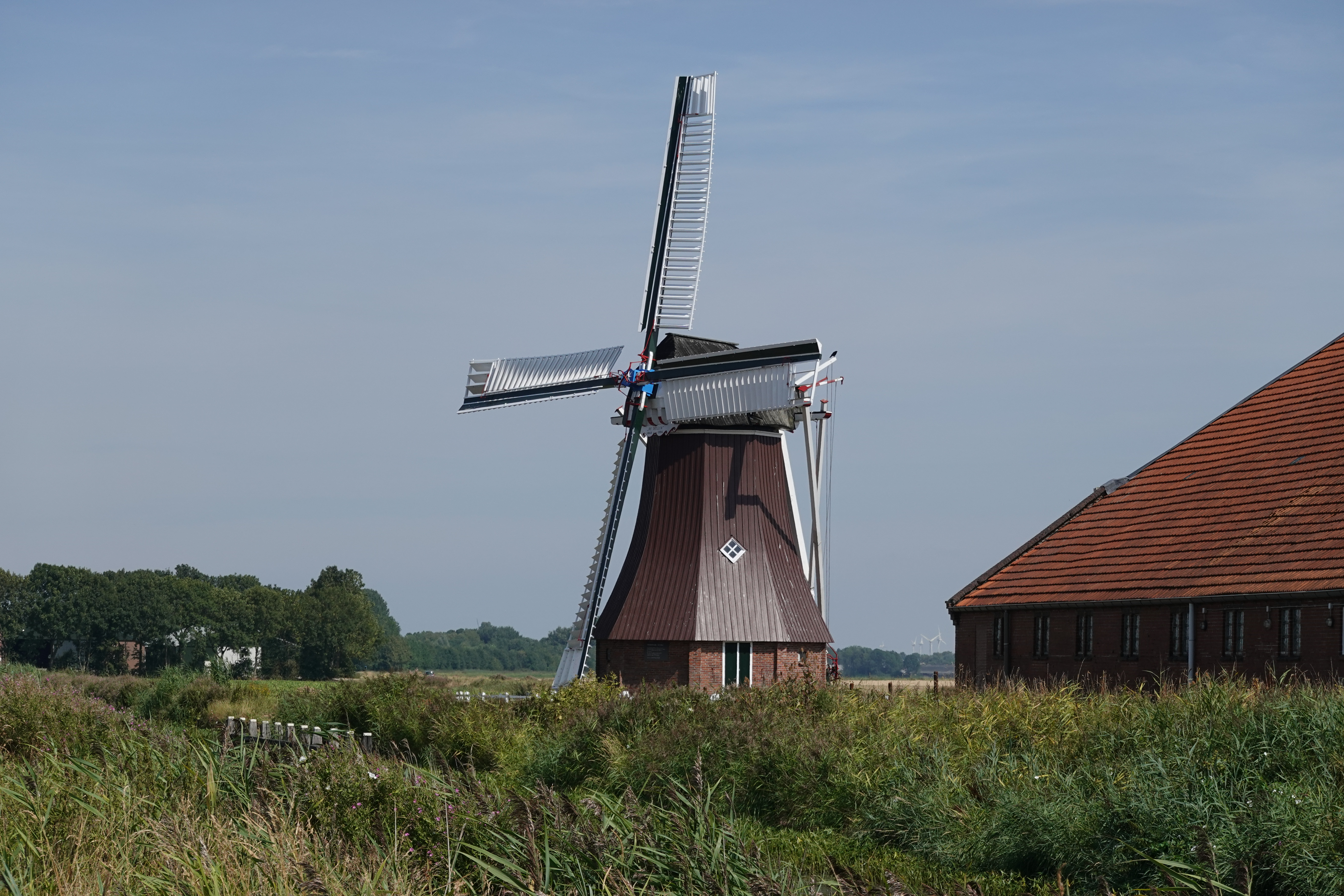
De Dellen

There are three polder mills in Nieuw-Scheemda. It contains the Paaltjasker Nieuw-Scheemda, the only remaining tjasker in Groningen which was constructed in 1992 by the municipality Scheemda. The polder mill de Dellen is an 1855 windmill which used to be located in 't Waar, however the polder had fallen dry and it was decided to move the mill 1.5 kilometres (0.93 mi) to the Tichelwaark polder where it functions as an emergency backup in case the pumping station fails.

Between 1910 until 1934, a railway line and train station was located in Nieuw-Scheemda, however only the coffee house has remained. In 2009, the municipality of Scheemda merged into Oldambt.
