= Richard Klinkhamer =

Dutch murderer (1937–2016)

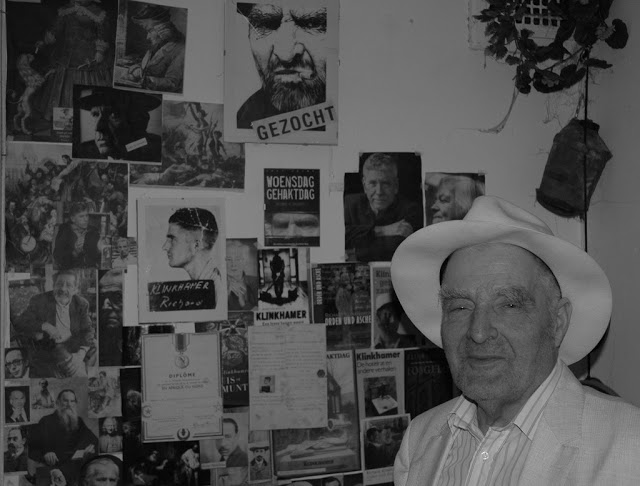
- Born: 15 March 1937; Ermelo, Netherlands
- Died: January 2016 (aged 78); Amsterdam, Netherlands
- Occupation: Writer
- Spouse: Hannelore (m. 1948; died 1991)
- Writing career
- Language: Dutch

Richard Klinkhamer (Dutch: [ˈriɕɑrt ˈklɪŋkˌɦaːmər]; 15 March 1937 – January 2016) was a Dutch writer of crime fiction who killed his wife in 1991 and went on to write a book about how he could have committed the crime. In 2000, he was sentenced to seven years in prison for manslaughter after killing his wife and hiding her body.

== Murder conviction ==
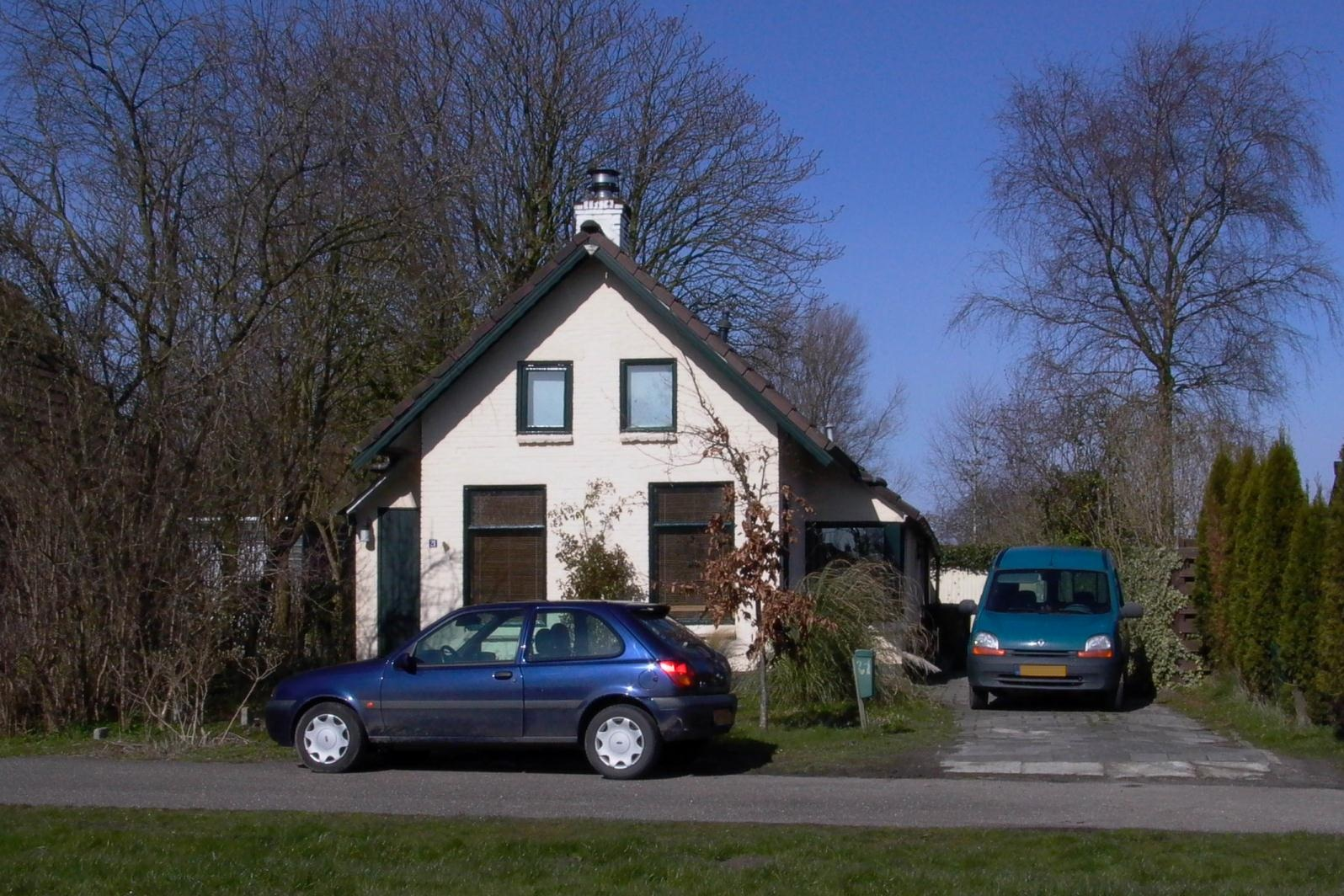
The Klinkhamers' former home, circa 2008

In 1991 Klinkhamer's wife, Hannelore (née Godfrinon), went missing from their home in Hongerige Wolf. A year later Klinkhamer went to his publisher with the manuscript for Woensdag Gehaktdag (lit. 'Wednesday, Mince Day'), which detailed seven ways in which he could have killed his wife. One scenario had him disposing of her body by pushing her flesh through a mincer, then feeding it to the pigeons. The manuscript was rejected by his publisher, Willem Donker, as being "too gruesome". Klinkhamer became the primary suspect in the police investigation for the disappearance of Hannelore: he was questioned several times and detained once. Nevertheless, the investigation yielded no concrete evidence against the writer.

In 1997 Klinkhamer sold the residence he had shared with his wife and moved to Amsterdam with a new girlfriend. Details of Klinkhamer's manuscript began to surface in the Dutch underground press, allowing him to become a minor celebrity and participate to the literary party circuit.

In 2000, the new occupants of Klinkhamer's former home started renovation on the garden, and work crews discovered the skeletal remains of his wife in clay beneath a concrete floor in the garden shed. Shortly thereafter he was arrested and charged with his wife's murder, to which he confessed. In 2001 Klinkhamer was sentenced to seven years in prison. He was released from prison in 2003 for good behavior. Klinkhamer died in January 2016, aged 78.

== Bibliography ==
- (1983) Gehoorzaam als een hond ISBN 90-236-5535-4
- (1983) De hotelrat en andere verhalen ISBN 90-236-5581-8
- (1993) Losgeld ISBN 90-6100-390-3
- (1996) Kruis of munt ISBN 90-5526-047-9
- (2007) Woensdag Gehaktdag ISBN 978-90-77895-91-7

== See also ==
- If I Did It: Confessions of the Killer
