= Oostwold Airfield =

Oostwold Airfield Vliegveld Oostwold
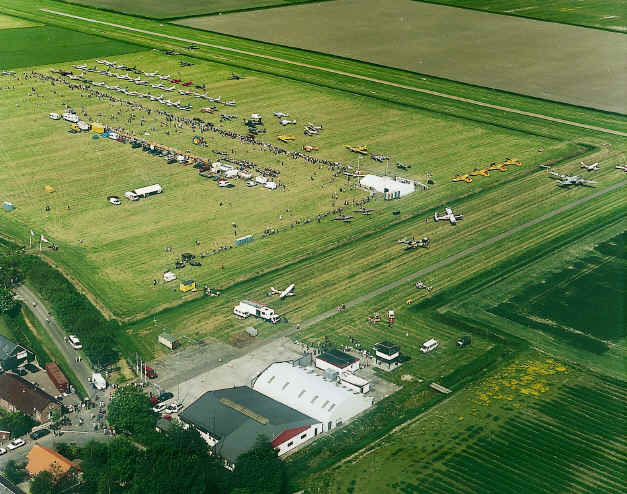
- IATA: none; ICAO: EHOW

Summary
- Airport type: Public
- Operator: Stichting Vliegveld Oostwold / Oldambt
- Serves: Winschoten, Netherlands
- Location: Oostwold
- Elevation AMSL: 3 ft / 1 m
- Coordinates: 53°12′29″N 007°01′54″E
- Website: www.Oostwold-Airport.nl

Map
- Location in the Netherlands

Runways
| Direction | Length | | Surface |
| Direction | m | ft | Surface |
|---|---|---|---|
| 07/25 | 880 | 2,887 | Grass, partial concrete |

Oostwold Airfield (Dutch: Vliegveld Oostwold), (ICAO: EHOW) also known as Groningen Airport Oostwold, is a small general aviation aerodrome in Oostwold, a village in municipality of Oldambt in the province of Groningen in the Netherlands. The airfield is 3 NM (5.6 km; 3.5 mi) north of the city of Winschoten. It has one runway, 07/25, with a length of 880 meters (2,887) feet. It has a grass surface, with a narrow concrete strip available for the first 600 meters (1,968 feet) in the 25 direction. Except for flights from Schengen countries, no international flights are allowed.
