= Hongerige Wolf =

- Hamlet
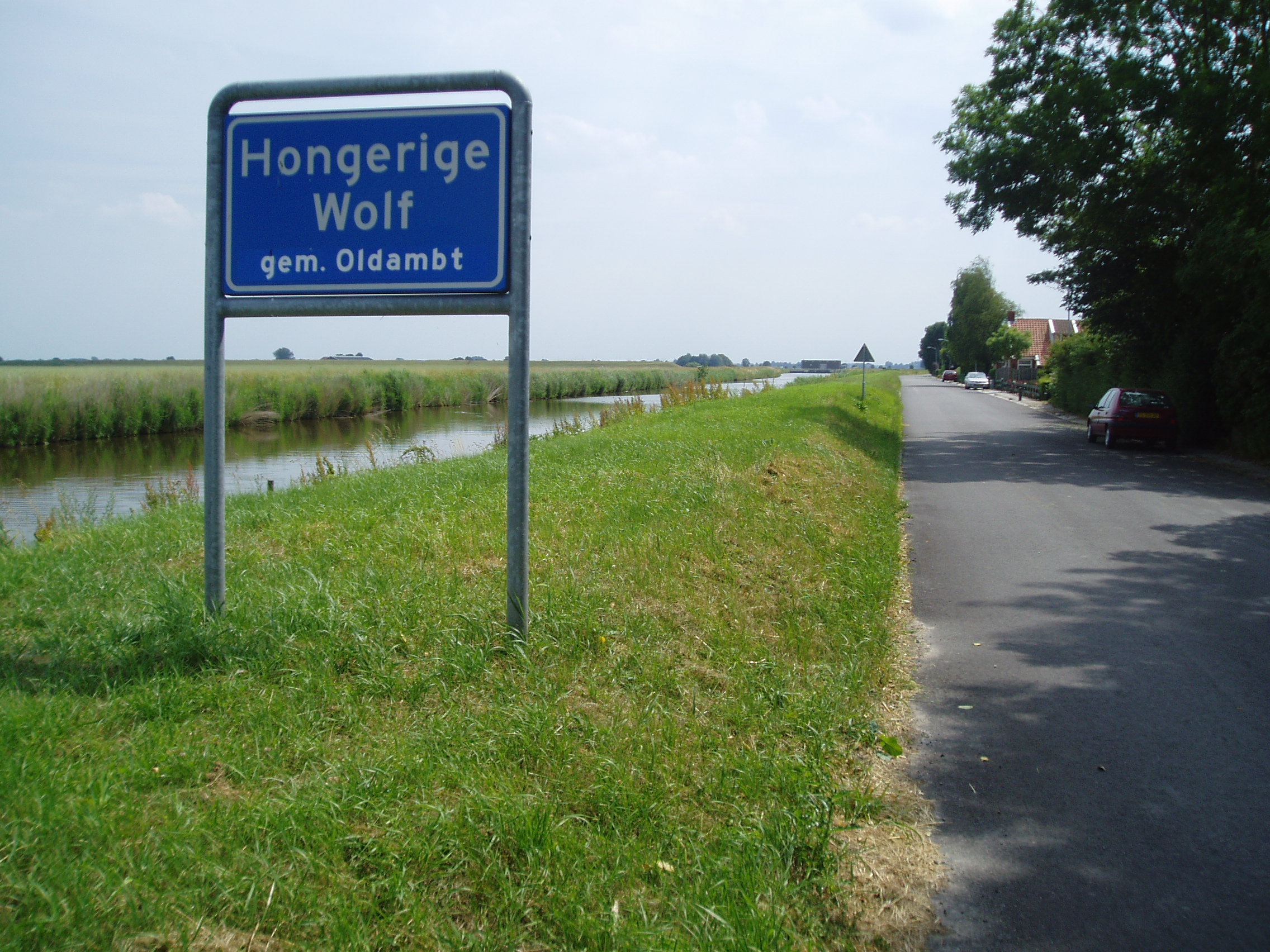
- Hongerige Wolf in 2010

- Location of Hongerige Wolf in Groningen in the Netherlands Hongerige Wolf (Netherlands)
- Coordinates: 53°13′N 7°8′E
- Country: Netherlands
- Province: Groningen
- Municipality: Oldambt

Population (1997)
  - Total: 30
- Time zone: UTC+1 (CET)
  - Summer (DST): UTC+2 (CEST)
- Postcode: 9684

Hongerige Wolf (Dutch pronunciation: [ˈɦɔŋərəɣə ˈʋɔl(ə)f]; Hungry Wolf) is a hamlet with a population of 30 in the municipality of Oldambt in the Netherlands.

== Overview ==
The origin of the name is unclear. It first appeared in a 1877 newspaper as "zoogedaamde Hongerige Wolf" (so-called Hungry Wolf). It is probably related to an inn in the hamlet with the same name. Nevertheless, the name stuck and the hamlet is nowadays known as Hongerige Wolf. It ceased to be a statistical designation, therefore, the latest population update is from 1997.

From 1991 onwards, Hongerige Wolf received national attention when Hannelore Klinkhamer disappeared. Her husband Richard Klinkhamer was prime suspect, however no evidence or body could be found. He moved in 1997, and in 2000, his wife's remains were discovered below the concrete floor of the garden shed. Klinkhamer was sentenced to seven years for manslaughter.

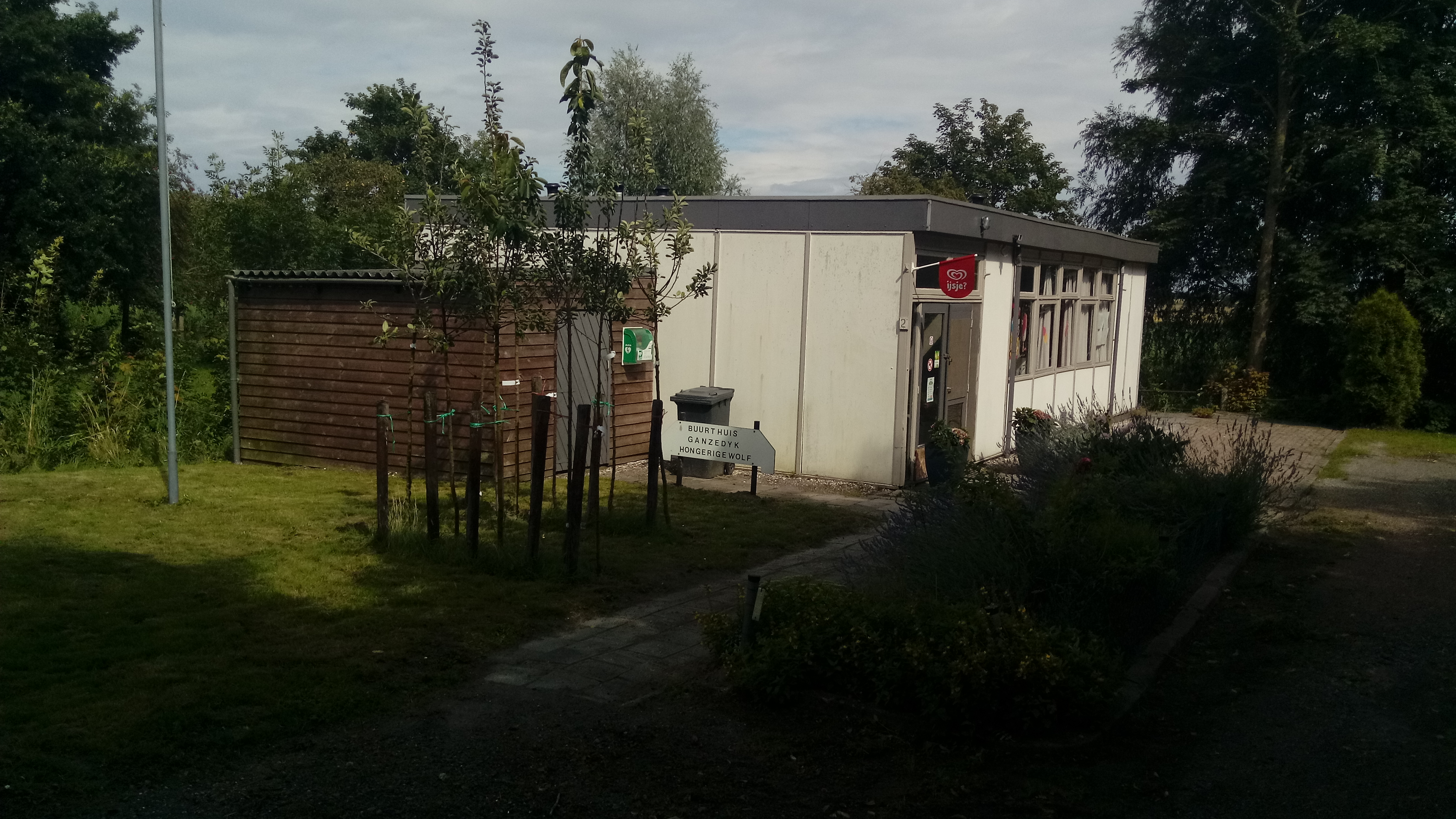
Neighbourhood centre Hongerige Wolf

Since 2011, an annual festival of arts and culture named Hongerige Wolf is being organized here.

In 2019, Hongerige Wolf won the award for most beautiful place name with 30% of the votes.
