= Jan Krajenbrink =

Dutch politician (1941–2020)

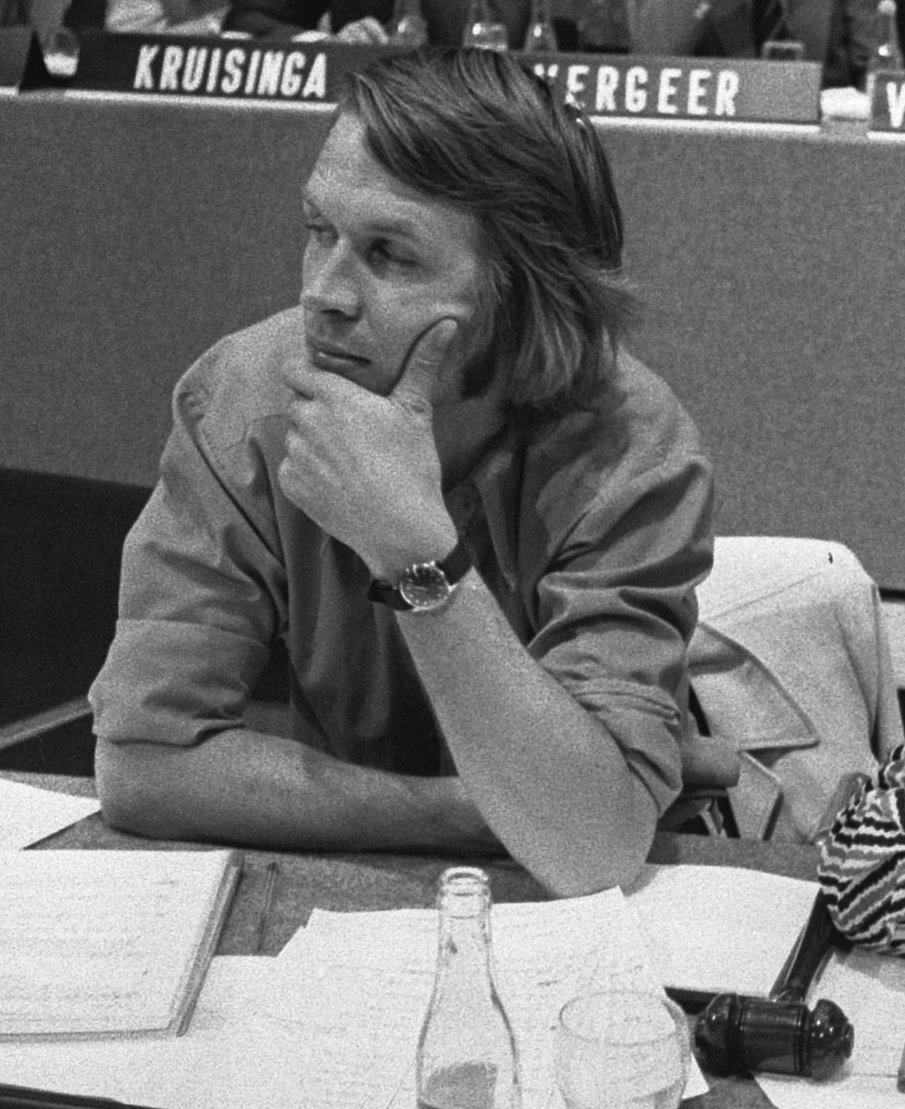
- Jan Krajenbrink (1975)

House of Representatives
- In office 10 June 1981 – 1 February 1994

Personal details
- Born: Jan Gerrit Henry Krajenbrink; 16 July 1941 Oostwold, Netherlands
- Died: 29 June 2020 (aged 78) Leiden, Netherlands
- Party: ARP, CDA

Jan Gerrit Henry Krajenbrink (16 July 1941 – 29 June 2020) was a Dutch politician. He was a member of the political parties ARP and later CDA. For the CDA he was a member at the House of Representatives (1981-1994) and afterwards mayor of Woudenberg until 2002.

== Career ==
Krajenbrink was born in Oostwold. He graduated in Law at the University of Groningen in 1965. He became Deputy Inspector at Dienst der Domeinen. Three years later he became a policy officer at the Dr. Abraham Kuyper Foundation; the ARP scientific office. Together with Piet Steenkamp (KVP) he was actively involved in the difficult merger of ARP, KVP and CHU into CDA. From 1973 he was the general secretary of the 'federal CDA'; until the three parties formally merged into the CDA in October 1980. From 1975 to 1980 he was city councilor in Bleiswijk. Krajenbrink was for CDA a House of Representatives member from 1981 to 1994. Subsequently, he was mayor of Woudenberg until 2002.

Krajenbrink died in Leiden on 29 June 2020.
