= Nieuwolda =

- Village
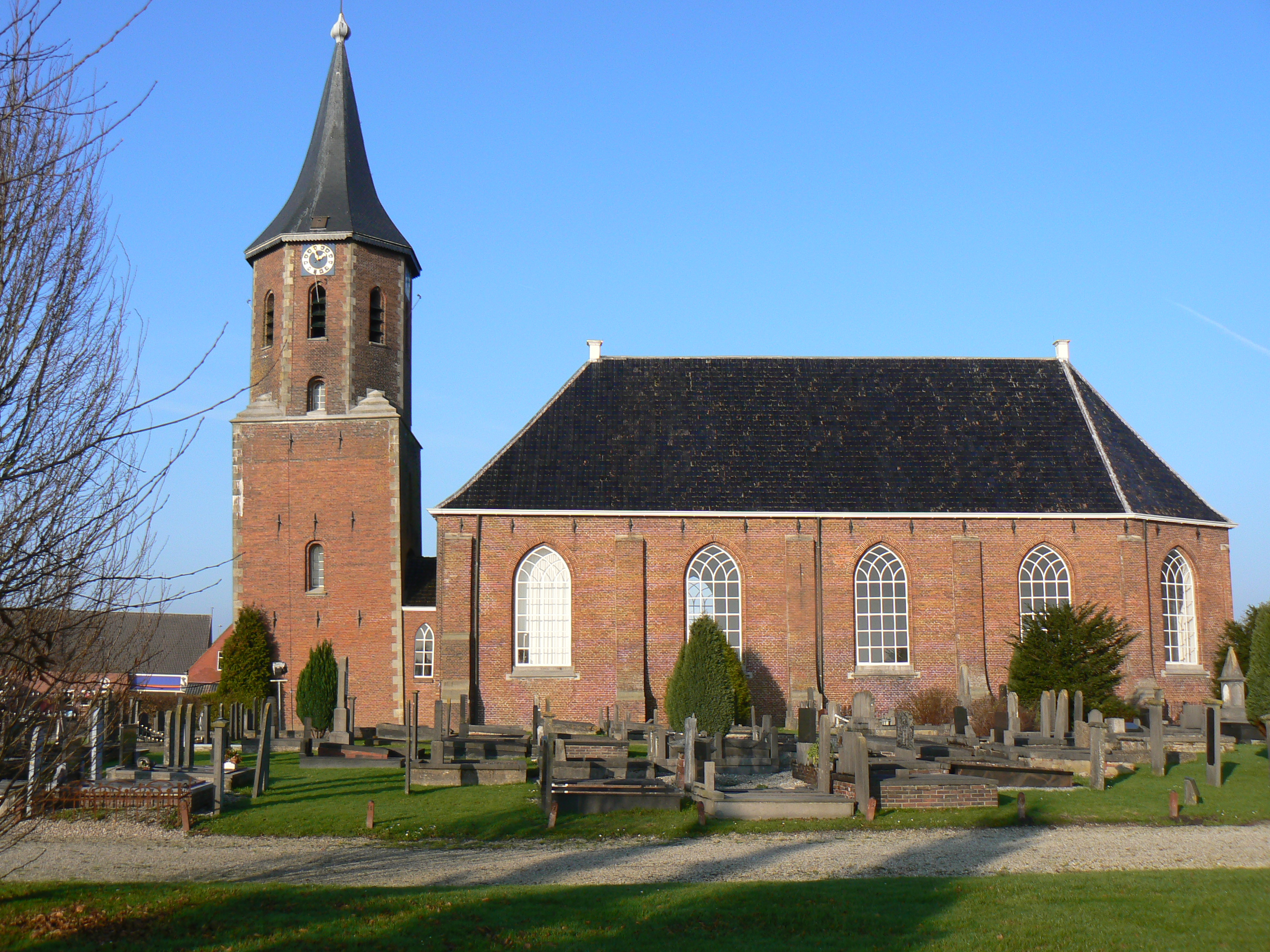
- Protestant Church in 2007

- Location of Nieuwolda in the province of Groningen Nieuwolda (Netherlands)
- Coordinates: 53°14′41″N 6°58′33″E
- Country: Netherlands
- Province: Groningen
- Municipality: Oldambt

Area
  - Total: 28.97 km^{2} (11.19 sq mi)
- Elevation: −0.3 m (−0.98 ft)

Population (2021)
  - Total: 1,350
  - Density: 46.6/km^{2} (121/sq mi)
- Time zone: UTC+1 (CET)
  - Summer (DST): UTC+2 (CEST)
- Postal code: 9944
- Dialing code: 0596

Nieuwolda is a village in the Dutch province of Groningen. It is located in the municipality of Oldambt, about 9 km southeast of Delfzijl.

Nieuwolda was a separate municipality until 1990, when it was merged with Scheemda.

== History ==
The village was first mentioned in 1711 as Midde en Nieuwolda, and means "new woods". Nieuw (new) was added to distinguish between Midwolda. Nieuwolda is a road village which developed as a satellite of Midwolda after the Dollart dike was constructed in 1545.

The Dutch Reformed church was built in 1718 and a tower was added in 1765. The weather vane is a mermaid as a reference to the reclaimed land from the Dollart. The pumping station De Hoogte was constructed in 1892 and was powered by a steam engine. In 1920, it was converted to an electric engine. It became obsolete in 1976. It has been restored and in use as a museum.

Nieuwolda was home to 1,315 people in 1840. It was a separate municipality until 1990, when it was merged with Scheemda. In 2010, it became part of Oldambt.

== Gallery ==
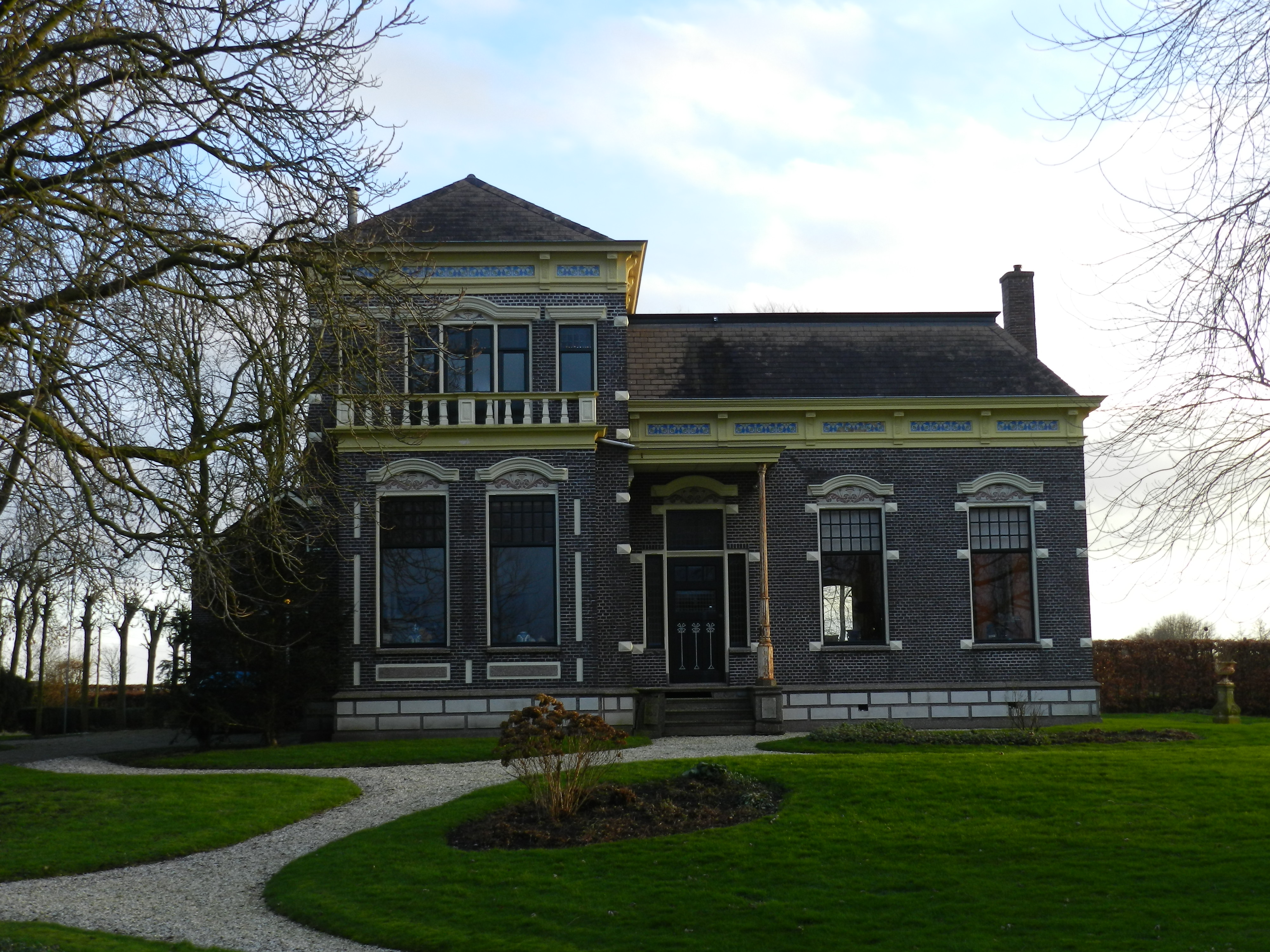
Farm in Nieuwolda

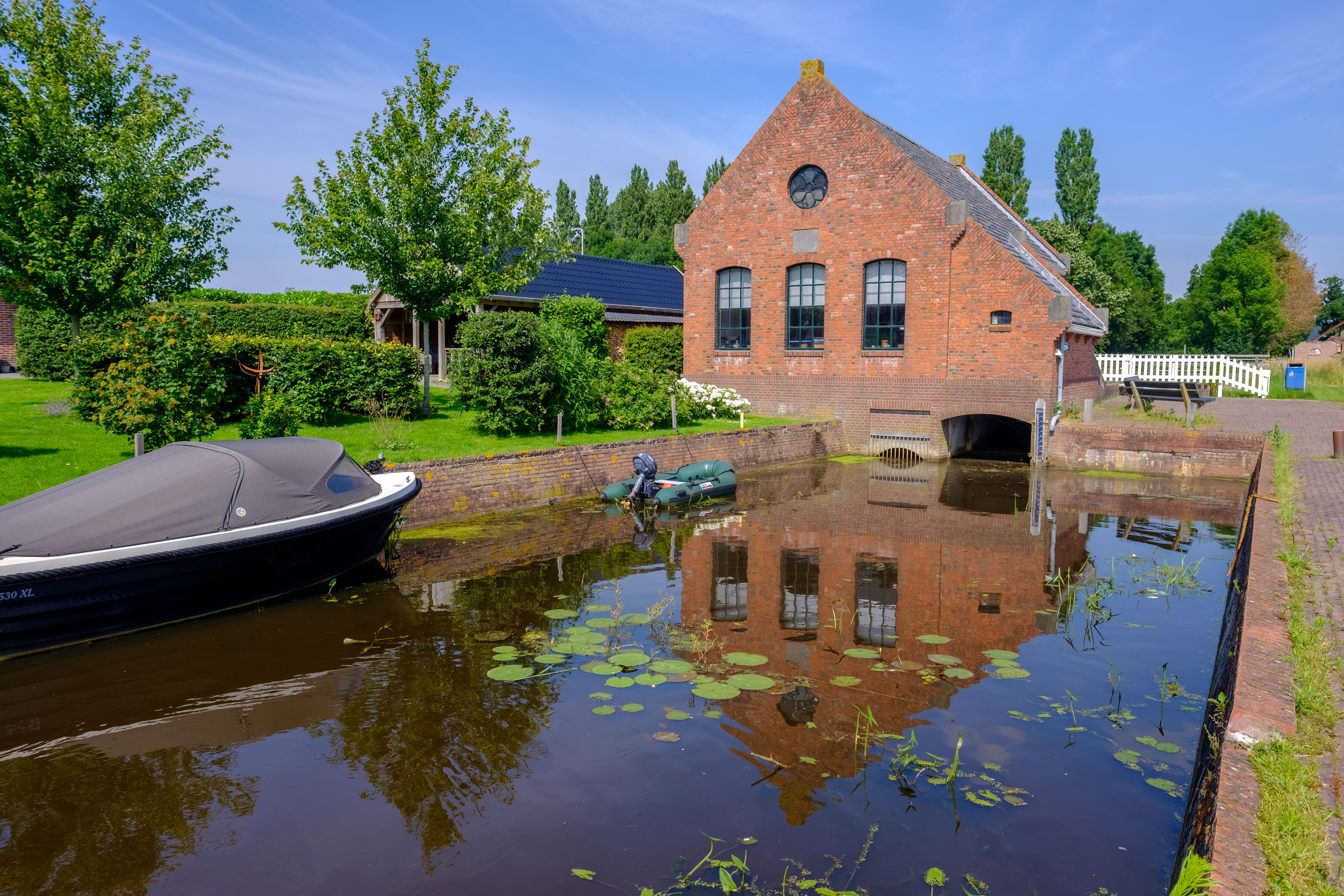
Pumping station De Hoogte

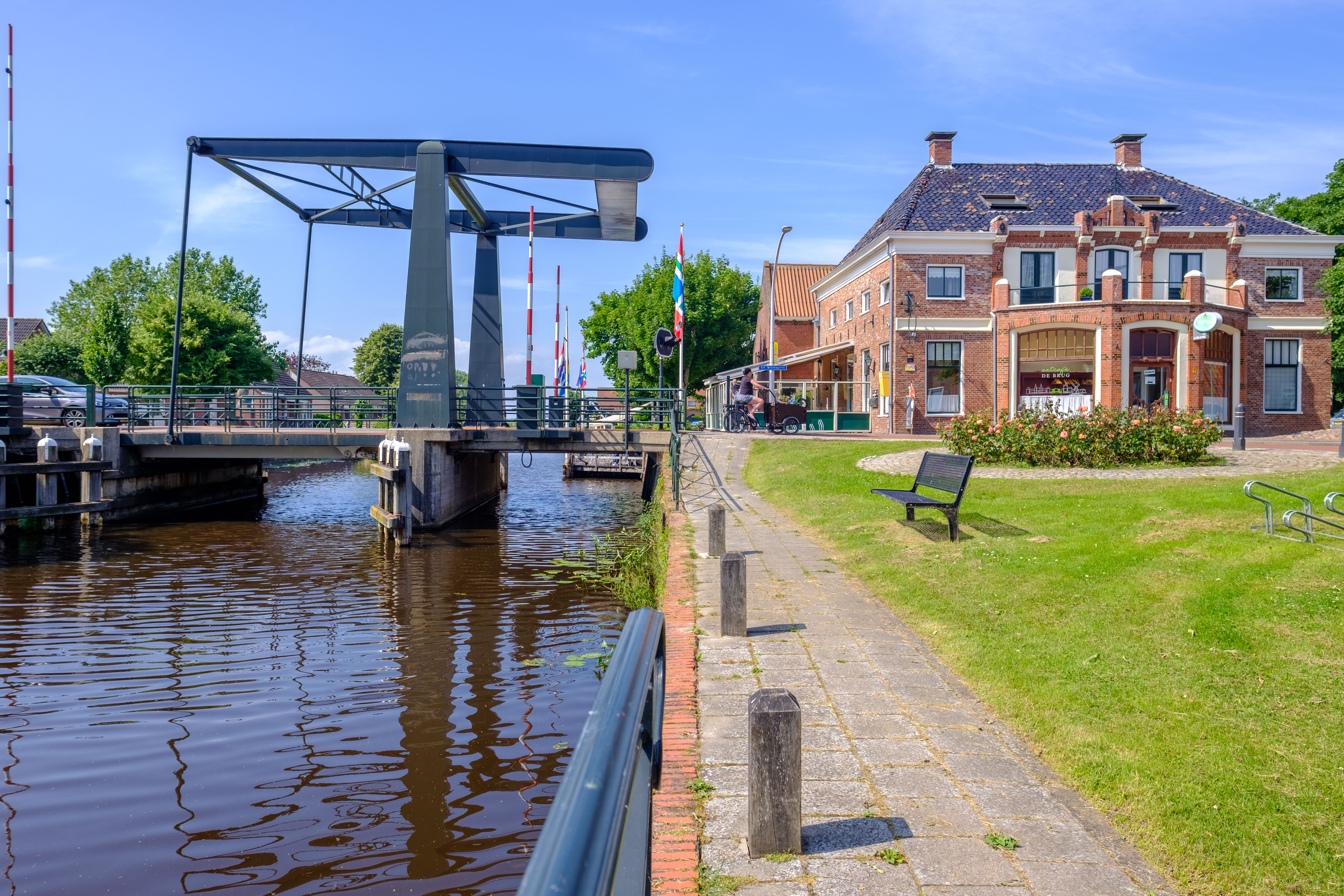
Draw bridge in Nieuwolda

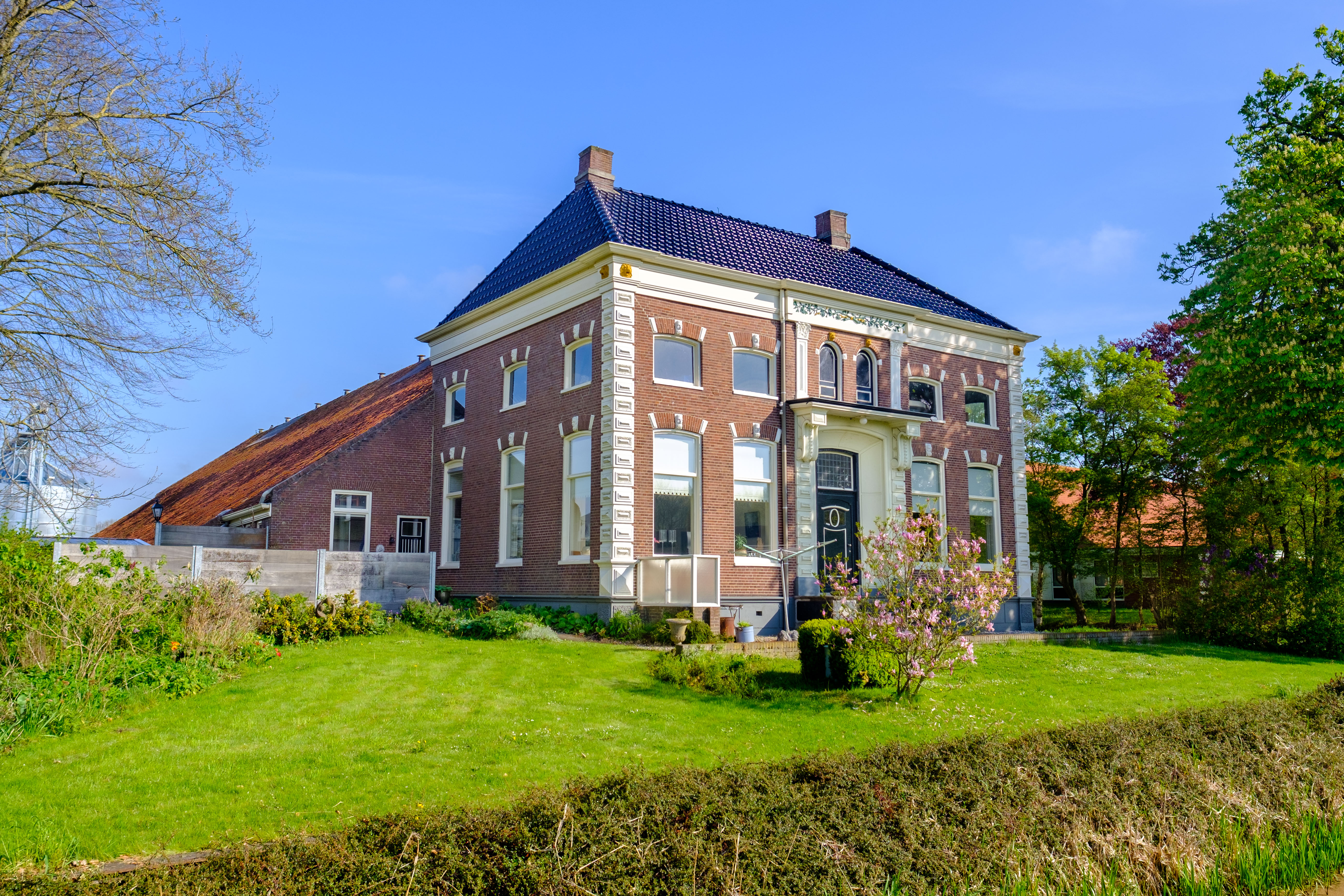
Farm in Nieuwolda
