= Oldambt (municipality) =

- Municipality
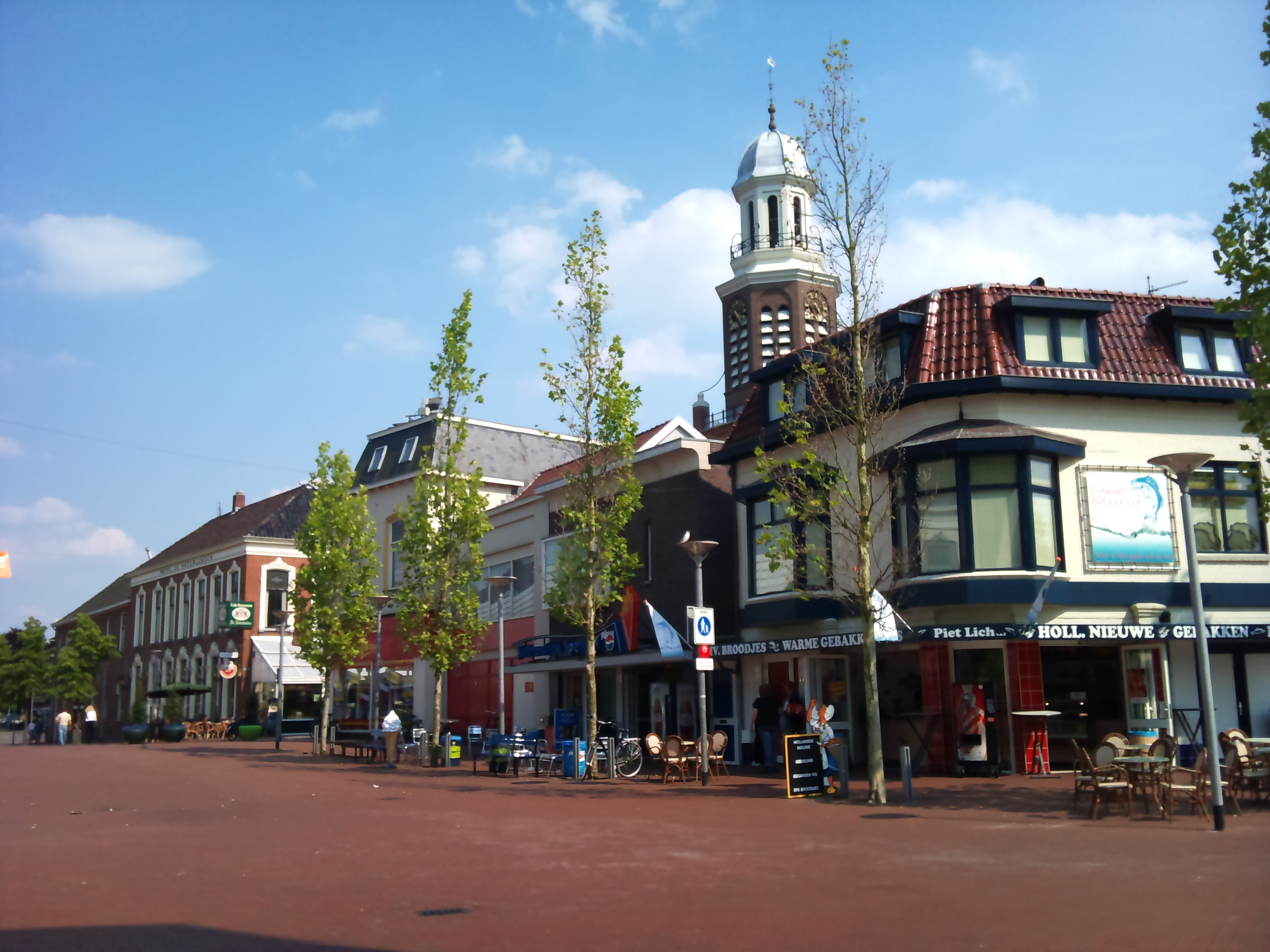
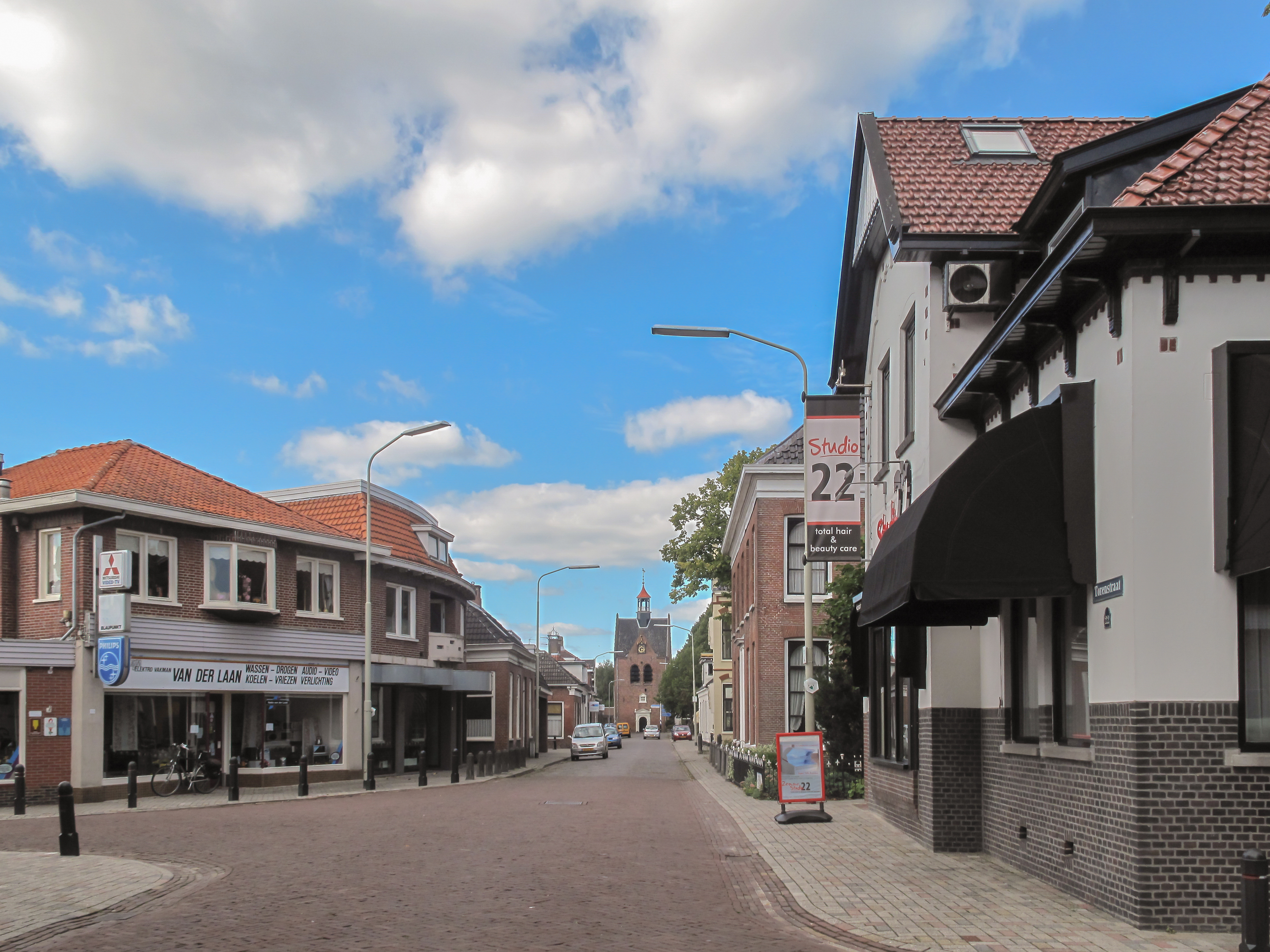
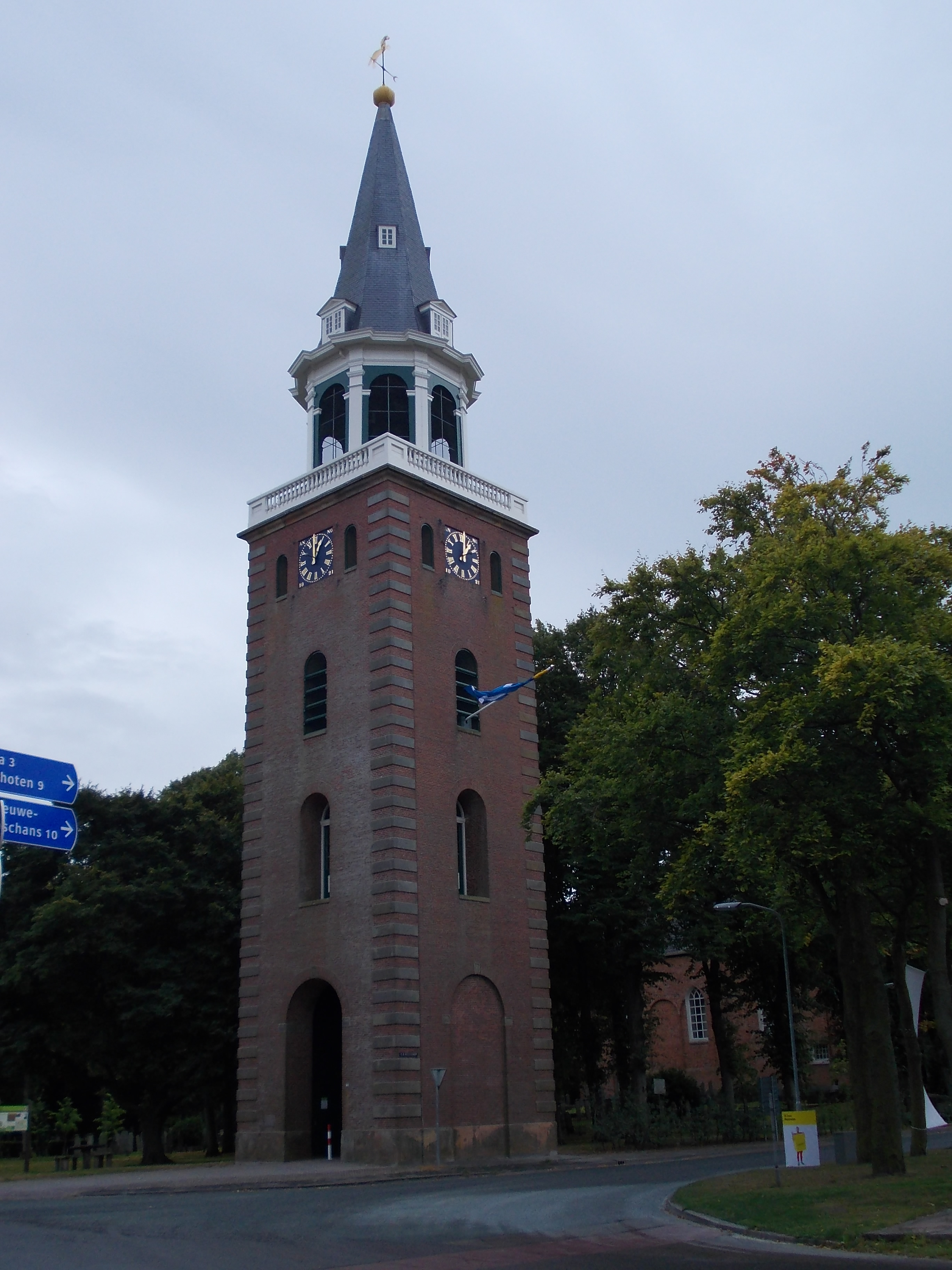
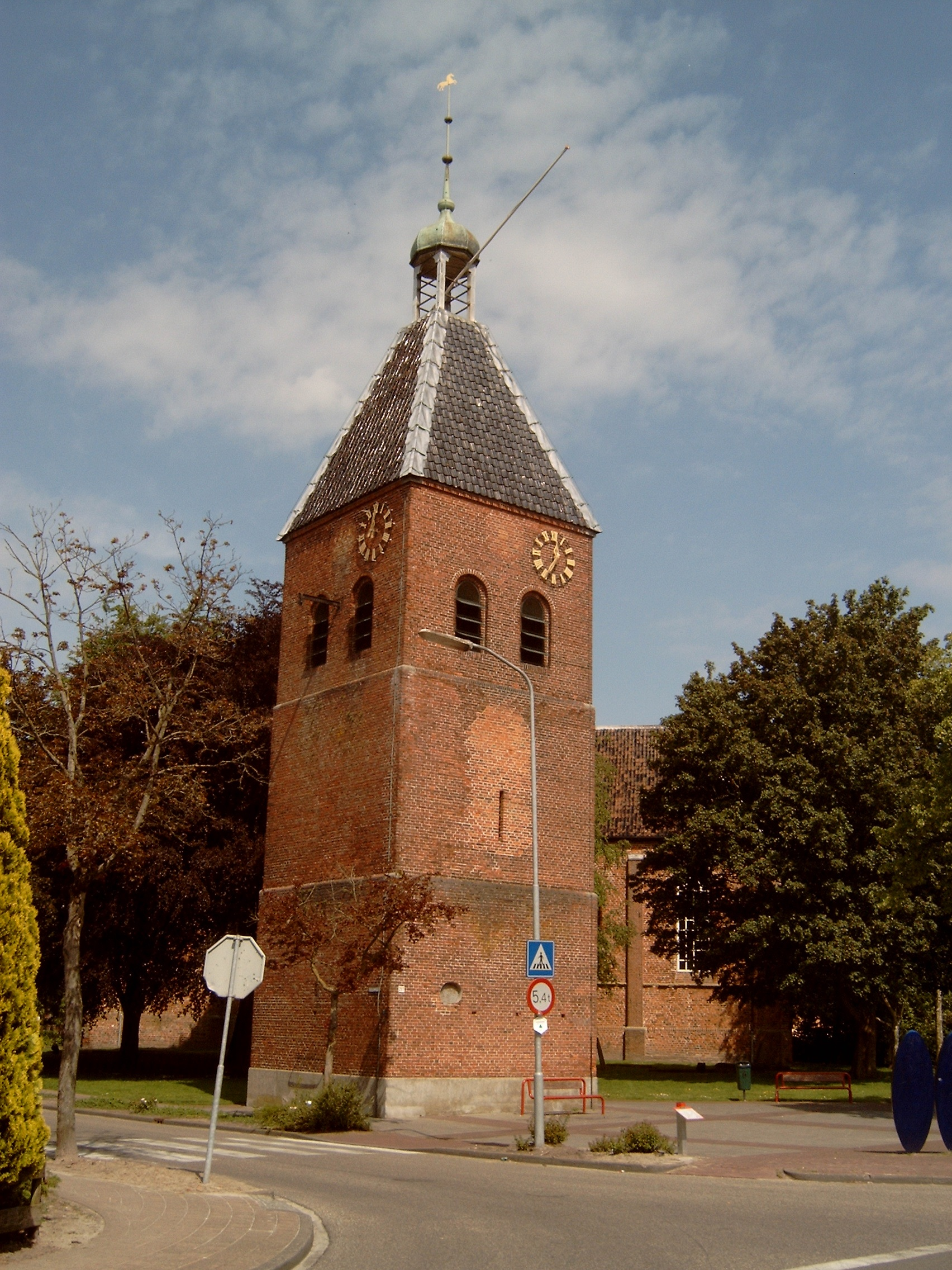
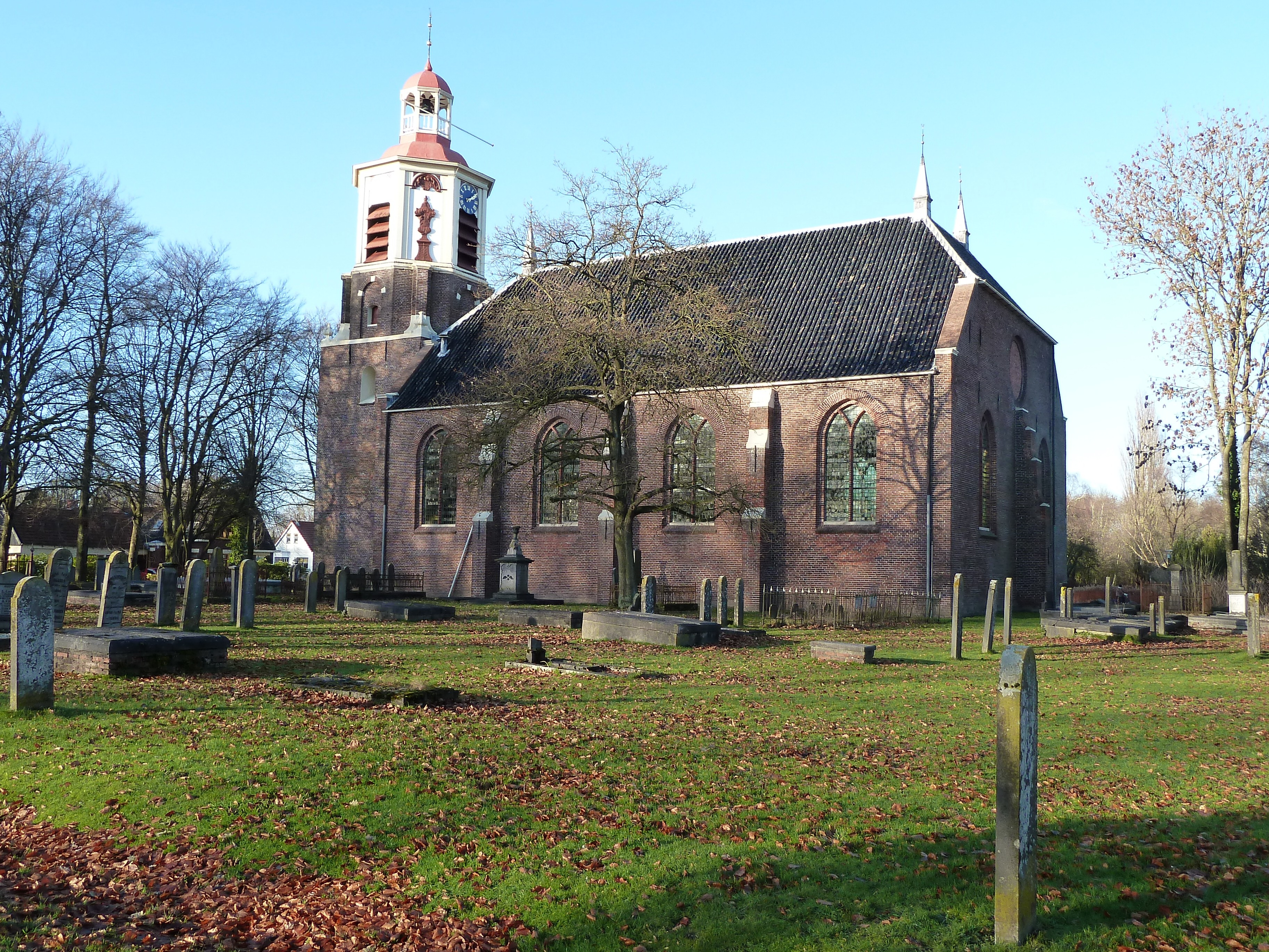
- Winschoten Scheemda Finsterwolde Beerta Midwolda

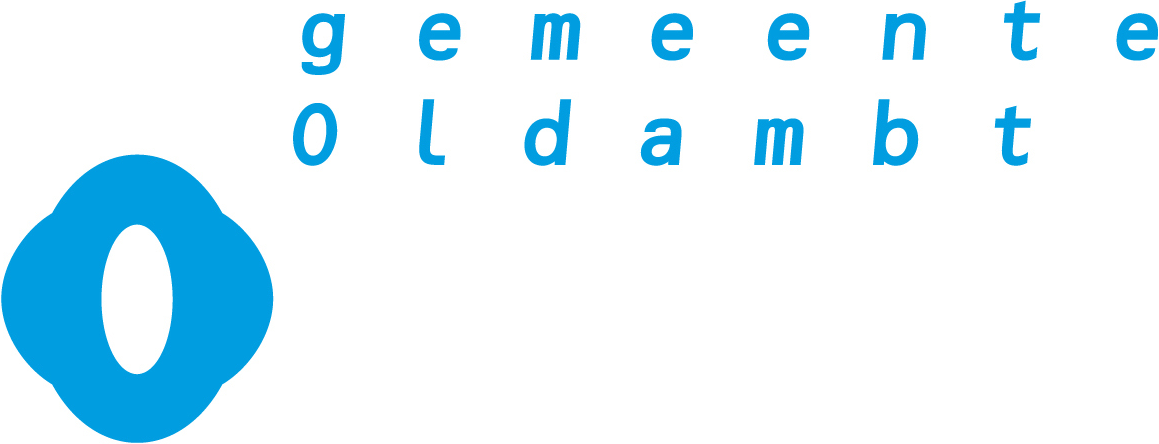
- Flag Coat of arms Brandmark

- Location of Oldambt in Groningen in the Netherlands
- Coordinates: 53°9′N 7°2′E
- Country: Netherlands
- Province: Groningen
- Established: 1 January 2010

Government
  - Body: Municipal council
  - Mayor: Cora-Yfke Sikkema (GL)

Area
  - Total: 295.96 km^{2} (114.27 sq mi)
  - Land: 226.66 km^{2} (87.51 sq mi)
  - Water: 69.30 km^{2} (26.76 sq mi)
- Elevation: 2 m (6.6 ft)

Population (January 2021)
  - Total: 38,277
  - Density: 169/km^{2} (440/sq mi)
- Time zone: UTC+1 (CET)
  - Summer (DST): UTC+2 (CEST)
- Postcode: Parts of 9600 and 9900 ranges
- Area code: 0596–0598
- Website: gemeente-oldambt.nl

Oldambt (Dutch pronunciation: [ɔlˈdɑm(p)t]) is a municipality with a population of 38,277 in the province of Groningen in the Netherlands. It was established in 2010 by merging the municipalities of Reiderland, Scheemda, and Winschoten. It contains the city of Winschoten and these villages:

- Bad Nieuweschans
- Beerta
- Blauwestad
- Drieborg
- Finsterwolde
- Heiligerlee
- Midwolda
- Nieuw-Beerta
- Nieuwolda
- Nieuw-Scheemda
- Oostwold
- Scheemda
- 't Waar
- Westerlee

== History ==
The name "Oldambt" from "Ol dambt" meaning "the old fill" is derived from land reclamation efforts, starting after the catastrophic floodings of the 13th century.

The municipality of Oldambt was established 1 January 2010, as a merger of the former municipalities of Reiderland, Scheemda and Winschoten.

== Geography ==
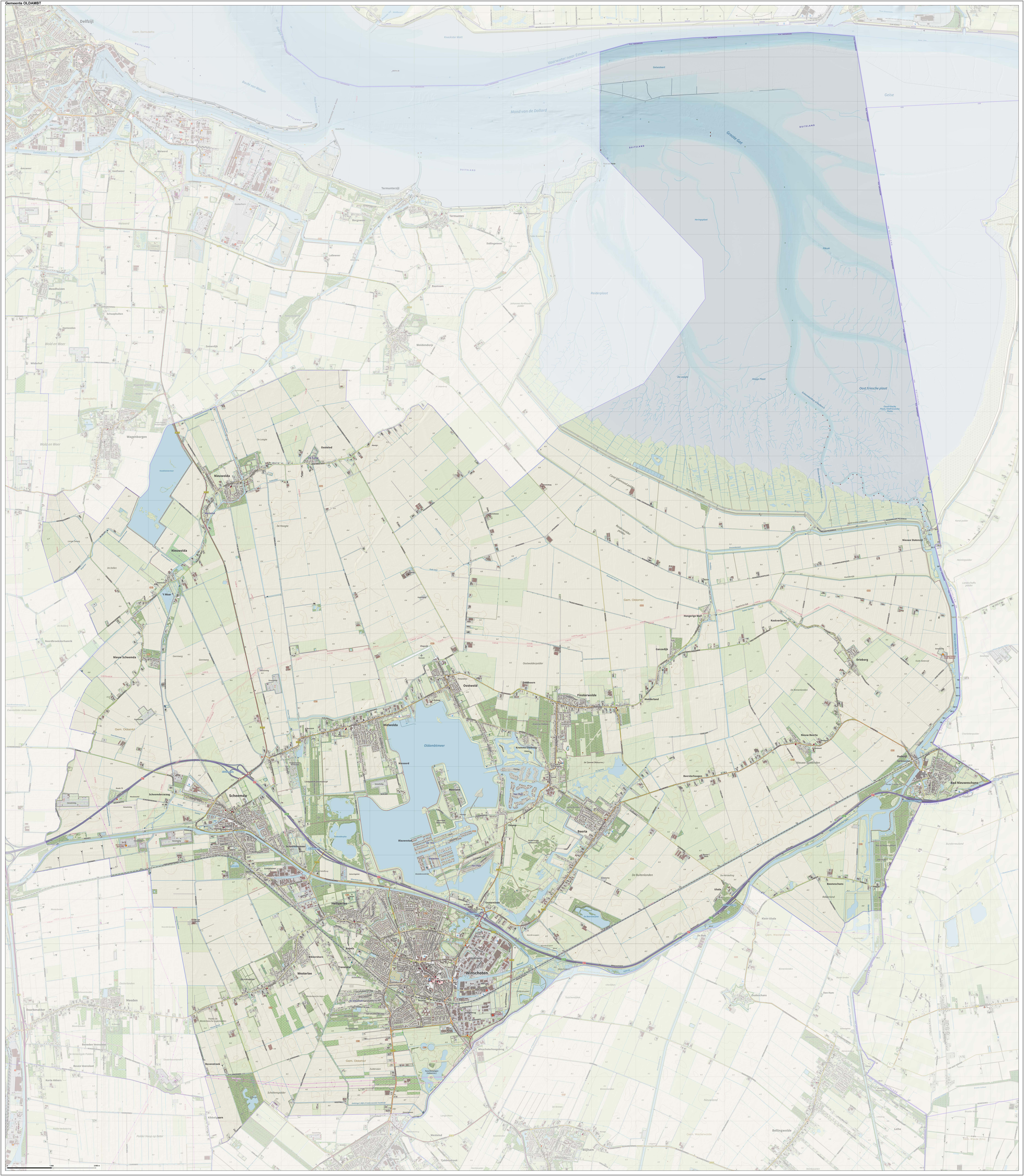
Topography of Oldambt in 2015

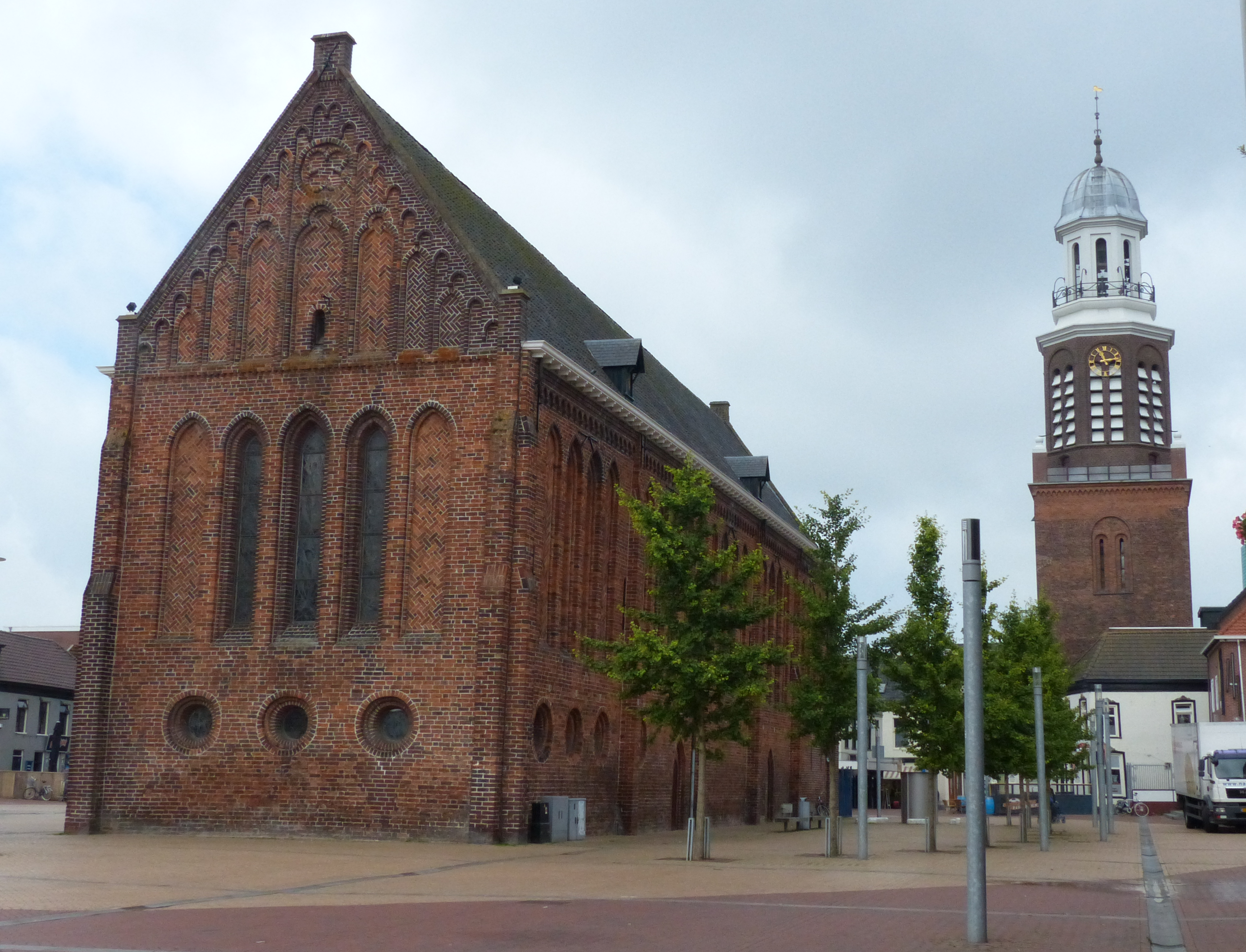
Marktplein church Winschoten and tower 'Ol witte'

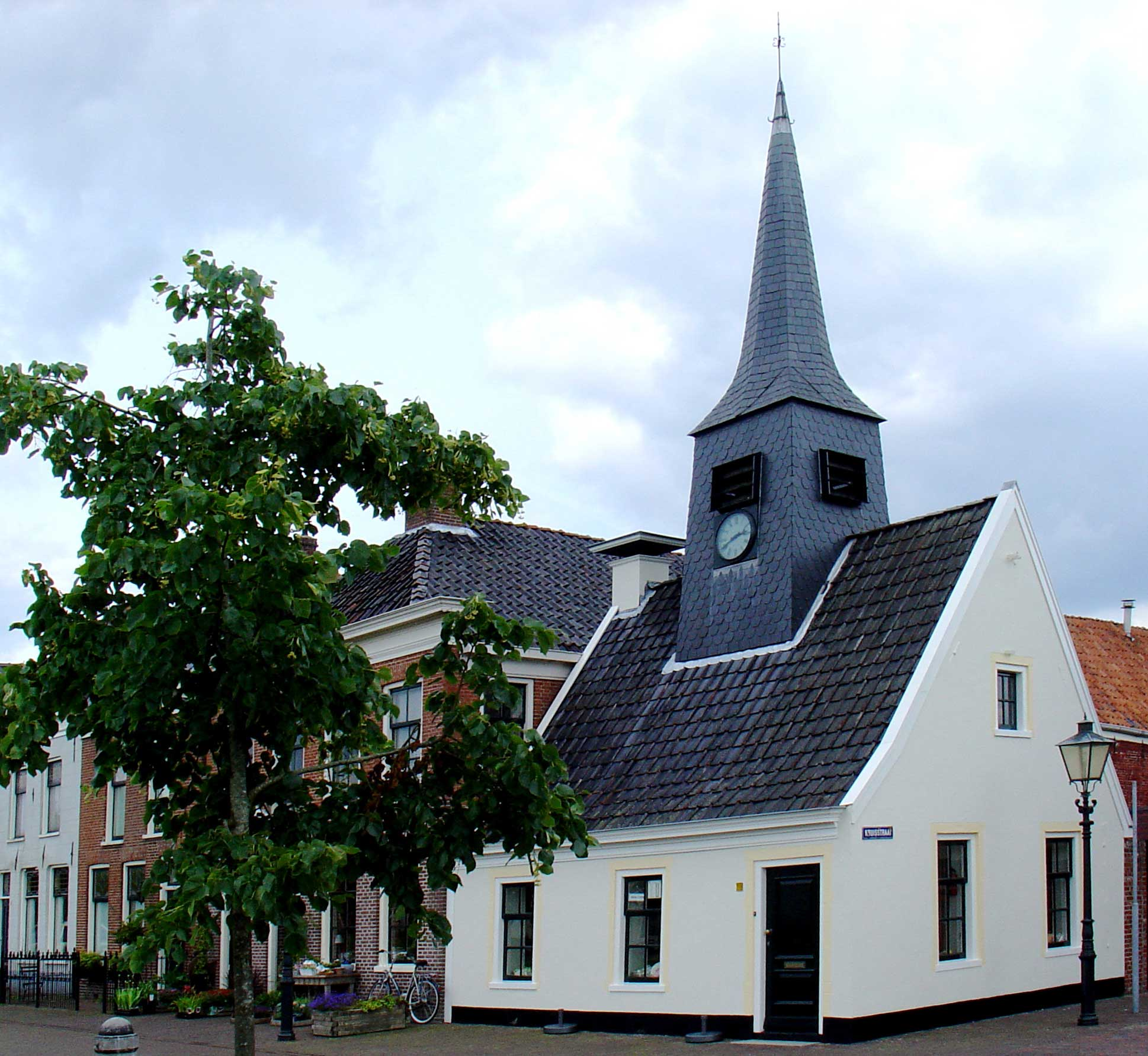
Guard building in Bad Nieuweschans

Oldambt is located at 53°9′N 7°2′E in the northeast of the province of Groningen in the northeast of the Netherlands on the border with Germany. Near Bad Nieuweschans is the easternmost point of the Netherlands. The municipality falls within the region of Oldambt and the western part falls within the region of Rheiderland.

The municipality is bordered by the Dutch municipalities of Delfzijl (in the north), Slochteren (northwest), Menterwolde (west), Pekela (southwest), and Bellingwedde (south), and by the German municipalities of Bunde (east), Jemgum (northeast), and Emden (north).

The municipality contains the city of Winschoten, the villages of Bad Nieuweschans, Beerta, Blauwestad, Drieborg, Finsterwolde, Heiligerlee, Midwolda, Nieuw-Beerta, Nieuwolda, Nieuw-Scheemda, Oostwold, Scheemda, 't Waar, and Westerlee, and the hamlet Hongerige Wolf.

In the north of the municipality is part of the Dollart in the Wadden Sea, which is a UNESCO World Heritage Site since 2009. In the center is the Oldambtmeer, an artificial lake of more than 800 ha.

== Demographics ==
As of 2021, Oldambt has a population of 38,277 and a population density of 169/km^{2} (440/sq mi). Oldambt is a developing municipality, in the heart of the region it is building a new housing area with more than 300 houses already: Blauwestad around the artificial lake Oldambtmeer of 800 hectares.

== Government ==
The government seat is in the city of Winschoten.

Mayor	Party	Period	Remarks
Martin Zijlstra	PvdA	2010	acting
Pieter Smit	D66	2010–2018	died in office
Rika Pot	PvdA	2018	acting
Cora Yfke Sikkema	GL	2018–present	

== Transportation ==
The highway A7 (E22) connects the municipality to the city of Groningen in the west and Leer (Germany) in the east. The Harlingen–Nieuweschans railway runs through the municipality with train stations in Scheemda, Winschoten, and Bad Nieuweschans. The trains are currently operated by Arriva and the busses by Qbuzz.

The train stops Heiligerlee and Ulsda were closed in 1934 and 1938.

== Hospital ==
The municipality has the most modern hospital of the province of Groningen, the Ommelander Ziekenhuis Groningen in Scheemda.

== Notable people ==
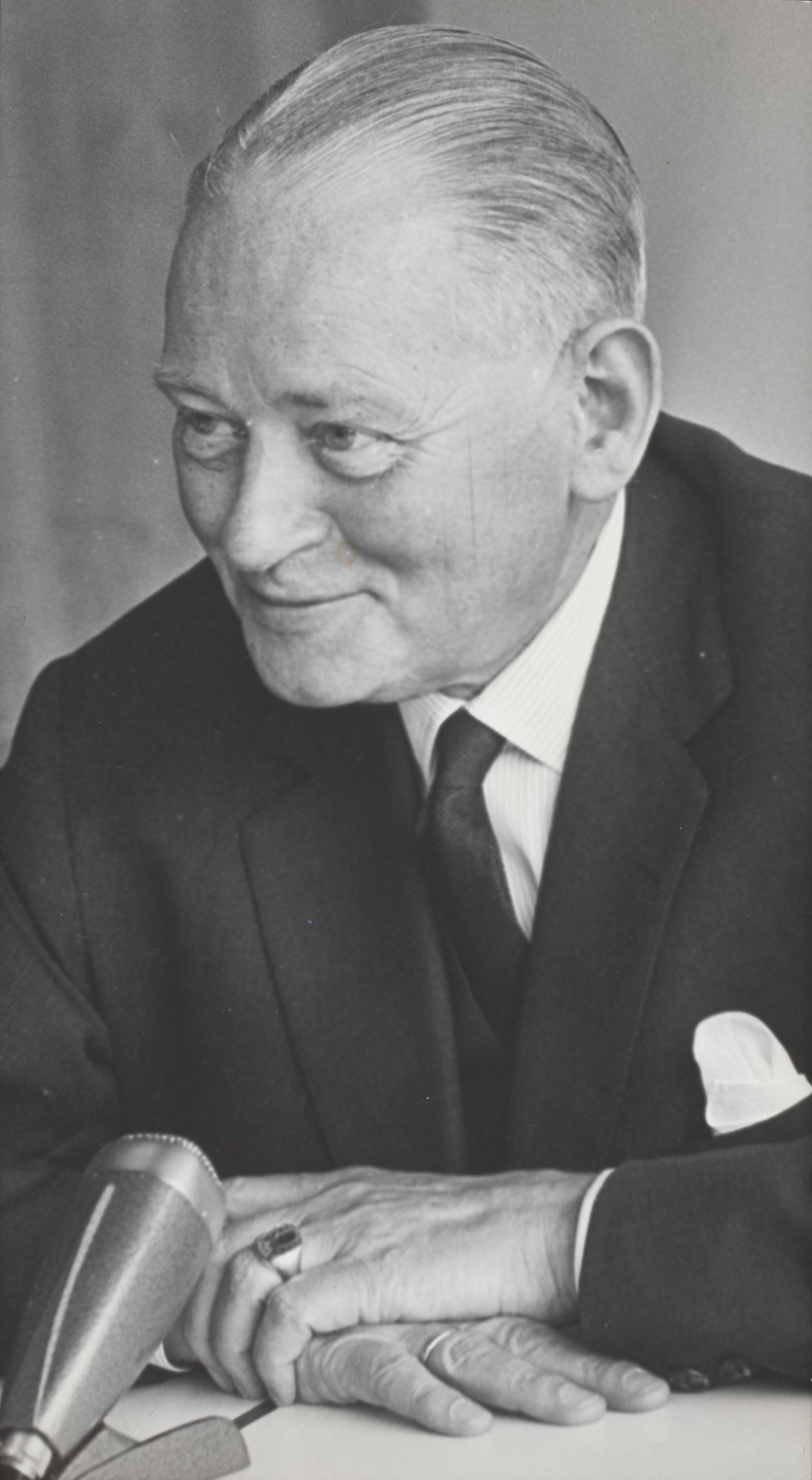
Dirk Stikker, 1964

- Wiebbe Hayes (born in Winschoten c. 1608) a colonial soldier and national hero who sailed on Batavia and after whom Wiebbe Hayes Stone Fort, the oldest European building in Australia, is named
- Dirk Stikker (1897 in Winschoten – 1979) a Dutch politician, diplomat and Secretary General of NATO 1961/1964
- Bernard D. H. Tellegen (1900 in Winschoten – 1990) a Dutch electrical engineer and inventor of the pentode and the gyrator
- Herman Makkink (1937 in Winschoten – 2013) a Dutch sculptor, graphic artist and illustrator
- Bas Jan Ader (1942 in Winschoten – 1975) a Dutch conceptual and performance artist and photographer
- Jos Silvis (born 1953 in Winschoten) a judge at the European Court of Human Rights 2012/2016 and then attorney general at the Supreme Court of the Netherlands
- Marcel Hensema (born 1970 in Winschoten) a Dutch film actor

=== Sport ===
- Levi Benima (1838 in Nieuweschans – 1922) a Dutch chess master
- Rynie Wolters (1842 in Nieuweschans – 1917) the first Dutch professional baseball player
- Jan de Bruine (1903 in Winschoten – 1983) a Dutch equestrian and silver medallist in show jumping at the 1936 Summer Olympics
- Arie Haan (born 1948 in Finsterwolde) a Dutch football manager and former player with 419 club caps
- Jurrie Koolhof (1960 in Beerta – 2019) a Dutch international football striker with 417 club caps and manager.
- Marnix Kolder (born 1981 in Winschoten) a Dutch professional footballer with over 500 club caps

== Gallery ==
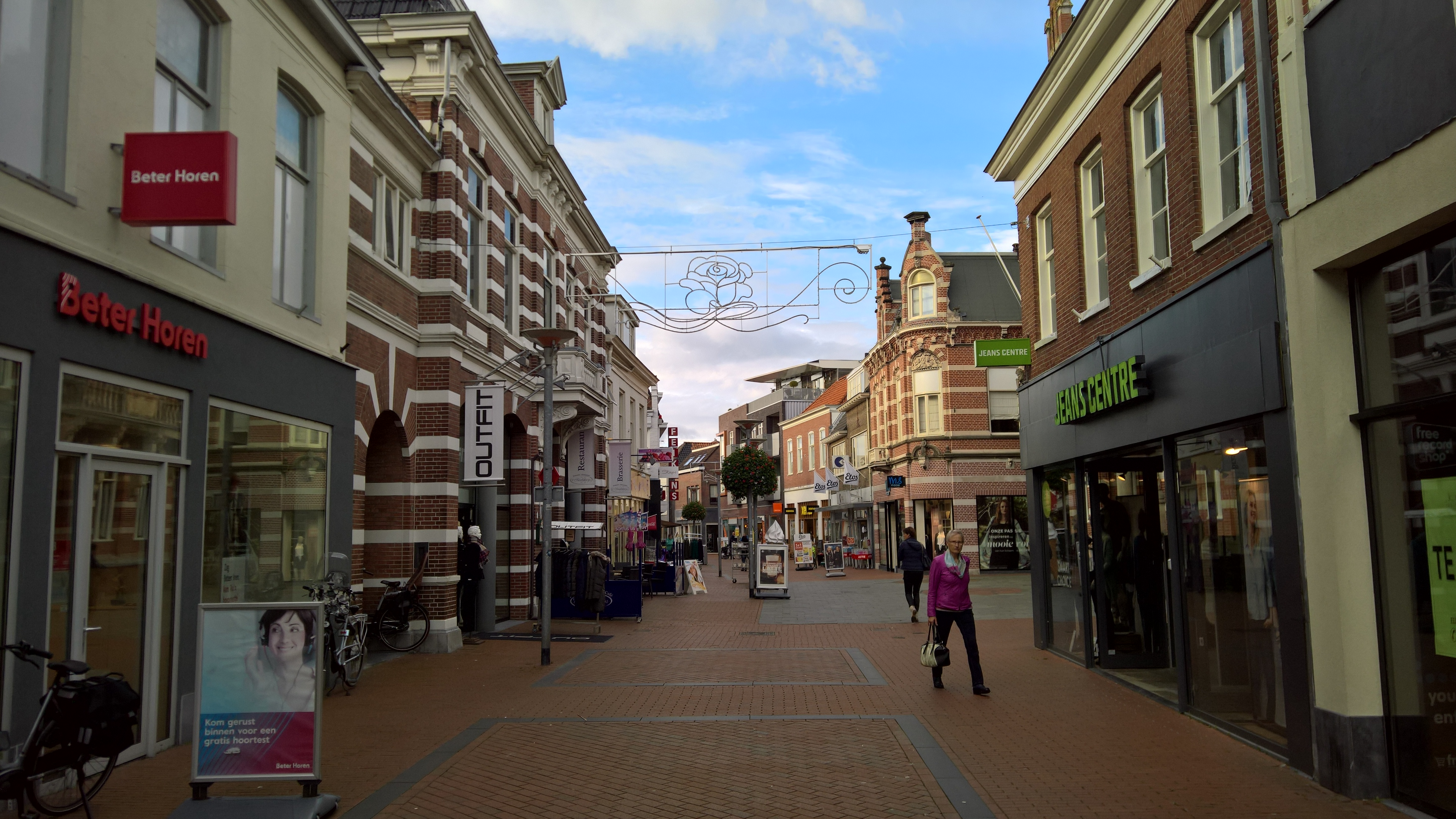

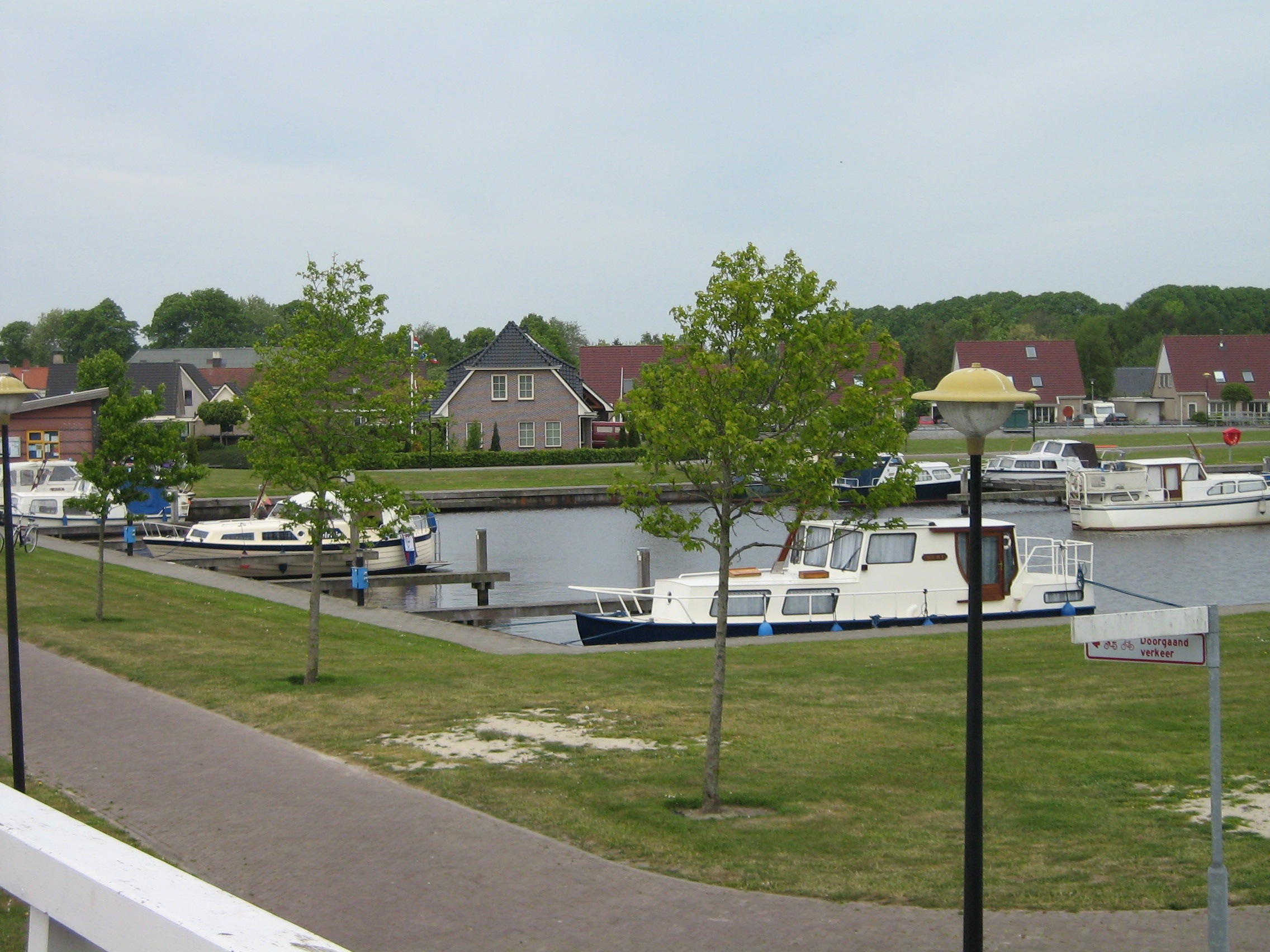

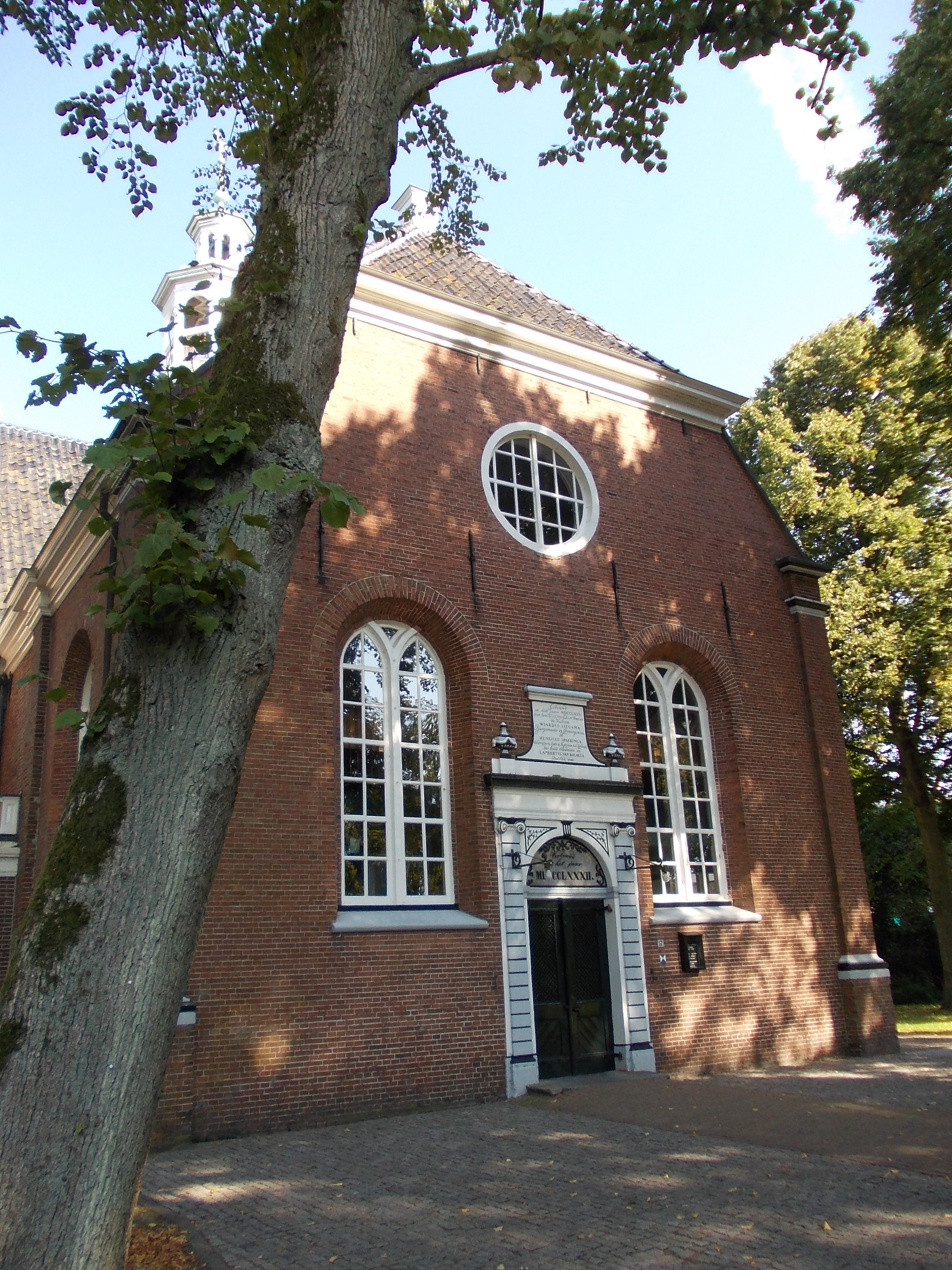

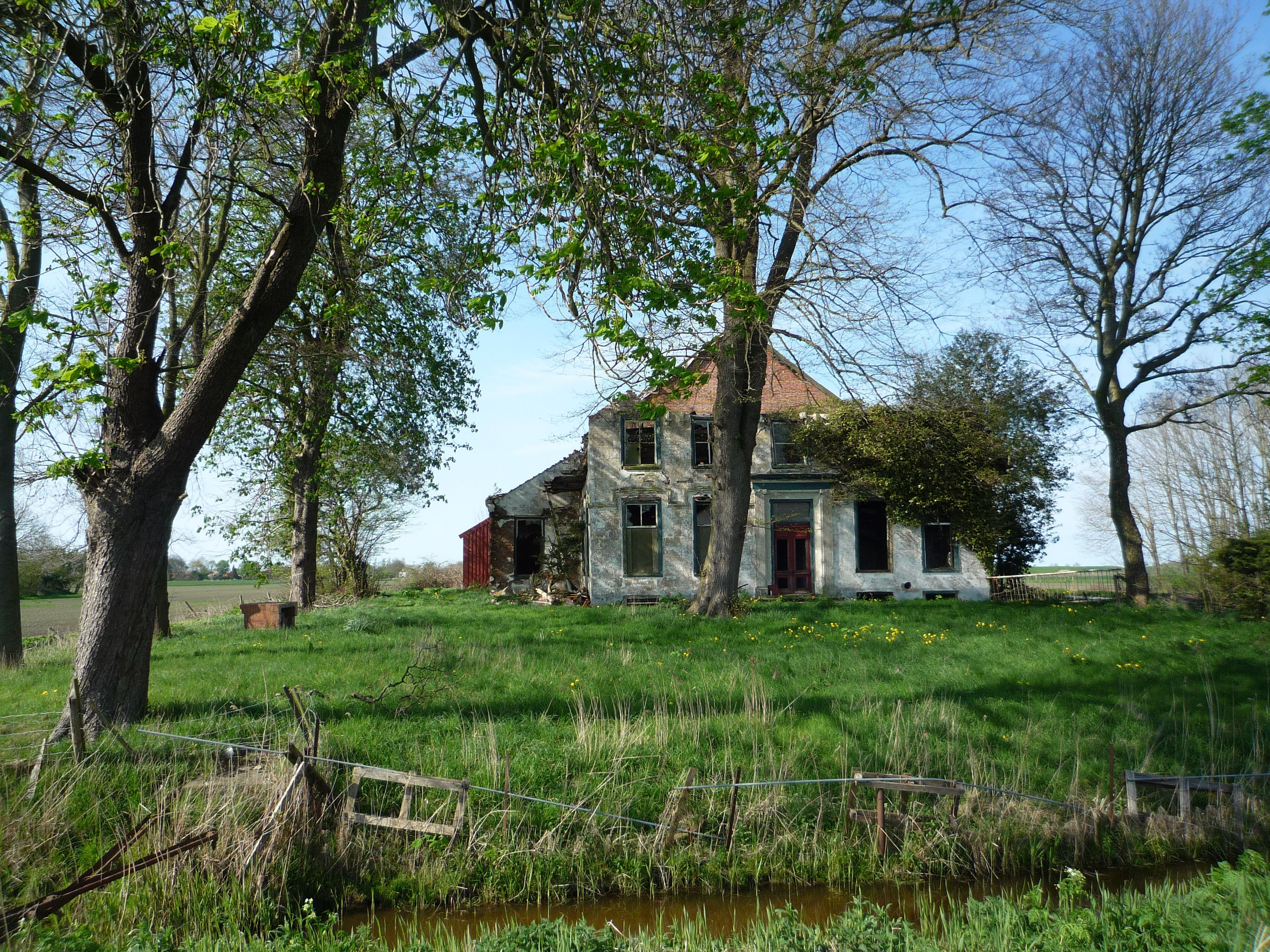
