= Oostwold, Oldambt =

Oostwold
- Village
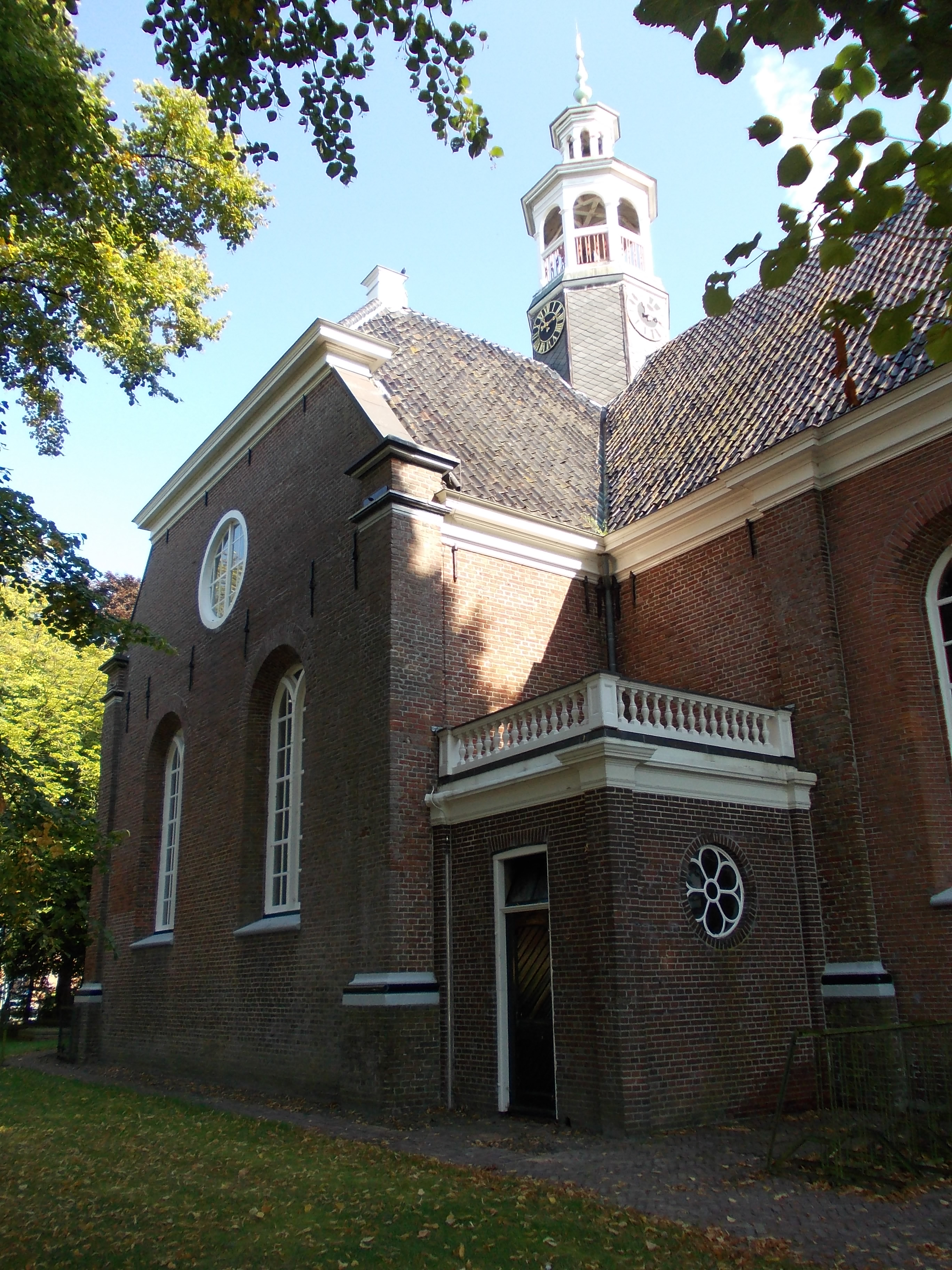
- Protestant Church in 2012

- Location on a map of Groningen (province)
- Coordinates: 53°12′09″N 07°02′40″E
- Country: Netherlands
- Province: Groningen
- Municipality: Oldambt

Area
  - Total: 1.22 km^{2} (0.47 sq mi)
- Elevation: 0.3 m (0.98 ft)

Population (2019)
  - Total: 960
  - Density: 790/km^{2} (2,000/sq mi)
- Time zone: UTC+1 (CET)
  - Summer (DST): UTC+2 (CEST)
- Postal code: 9682
- Dialing code: 0597

Oostwold is a village in the municipality of Oldambt in the province of Groningen in the Netherlands. The village is home to the Oostwold Airport. The village had a population of 960 people as of 2019.

== History ==
The village was first mentioned in 1273 as Astawalda, and means "eastern woods". East is relative to Midwolda. Oostwold is a road village which developed on the edge of the former peninsula of Winschoten. 1545 the Dollart dike was constructed to the north of the village.

The first church was demolished in 1543. In 1598, a new church was built which was replaced between 1775 and 1776 by the current church. The church is known for its Freytag organ from 1811 which attract organists from around the world who are allowed to play the organ for a while.

Oostwold was home to 605 people in 1840. In 1960, Oostwold Airport was established for agricultural air planes, however it shifted to small air planes. In 2010, it became part of the Oldambt.

== Notable people ==
- Jan Krajenbrink (1941-2020), politician and mayor.

== Gallery ==
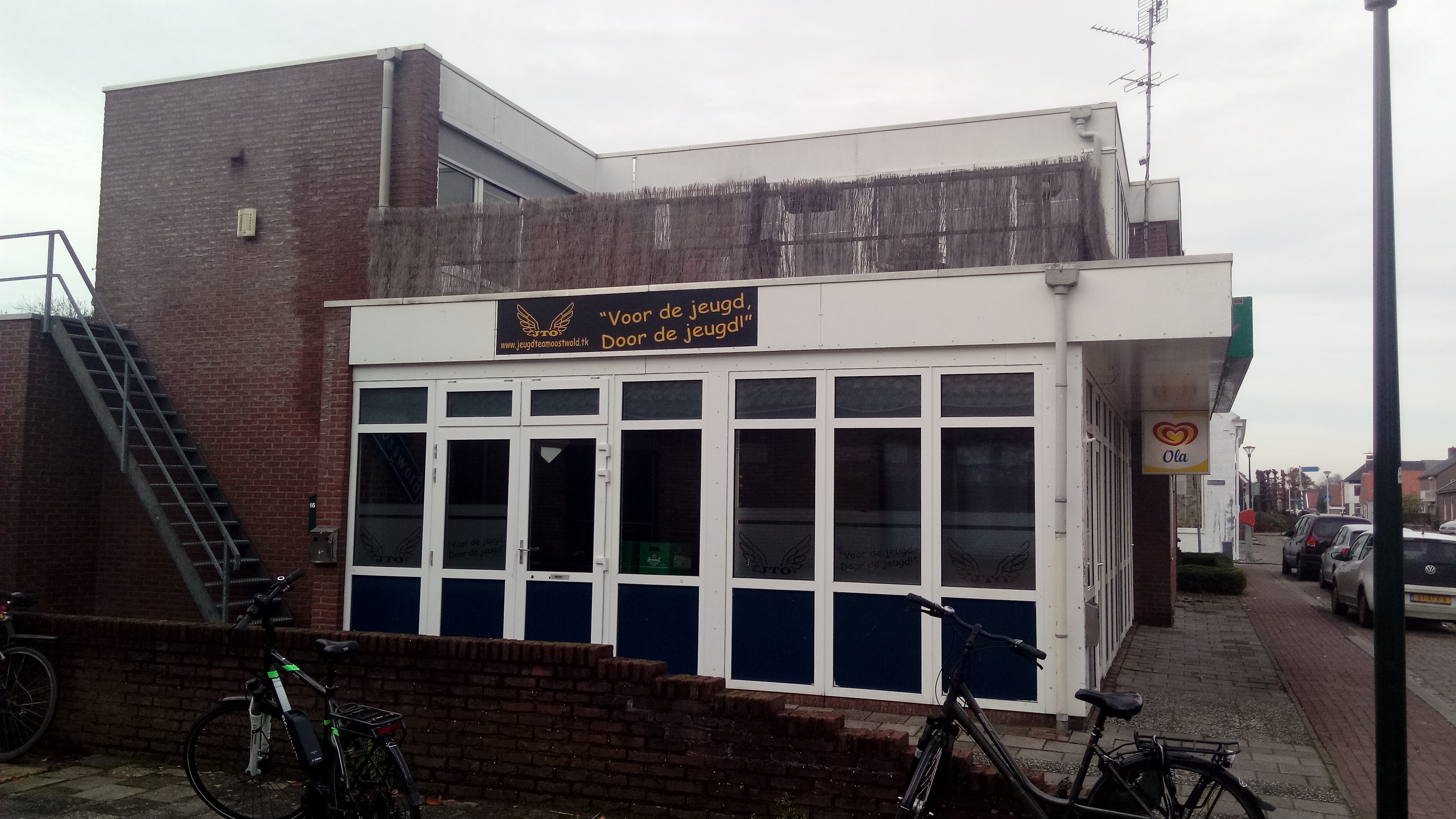
Youth centre

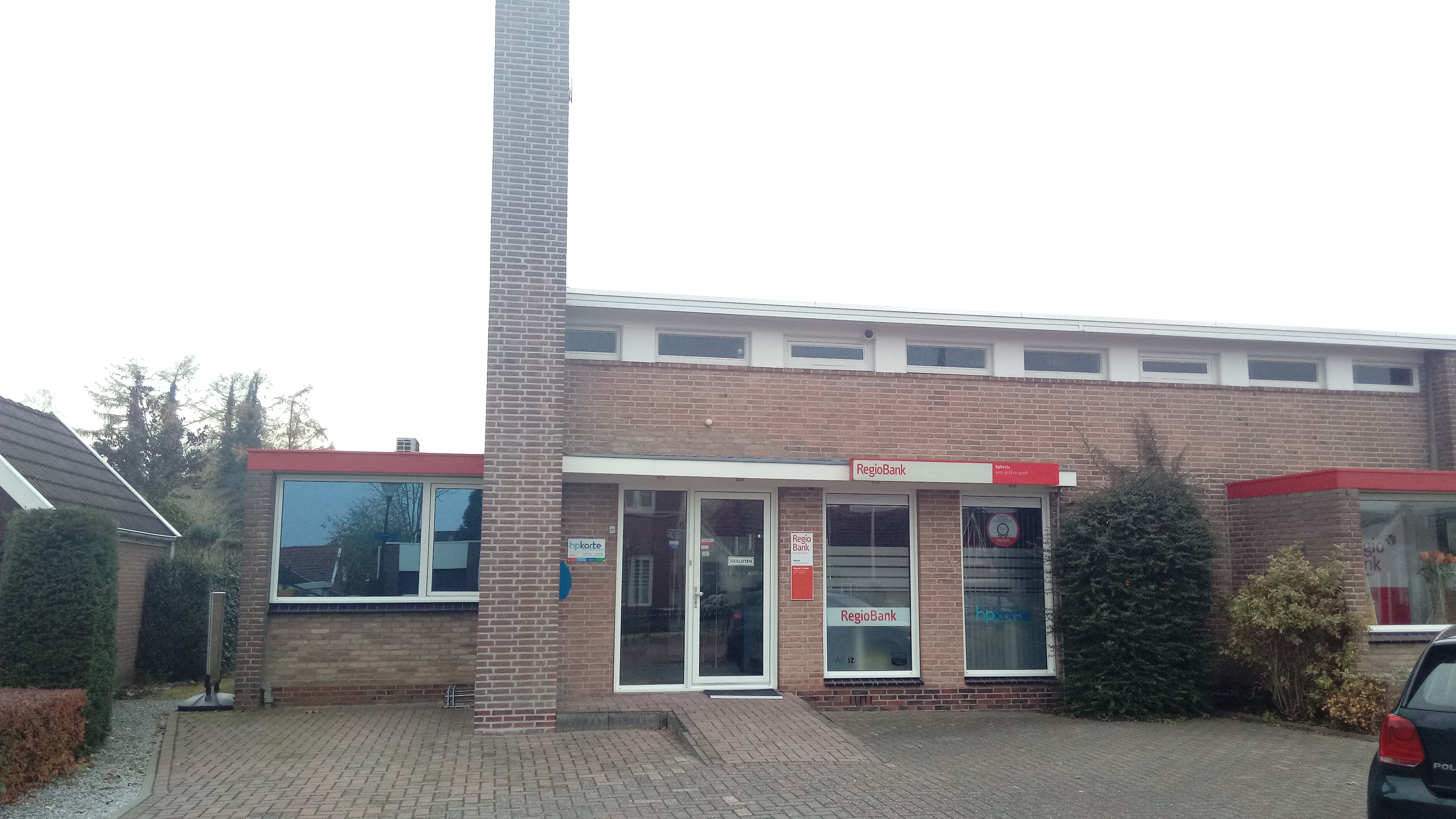
Bank

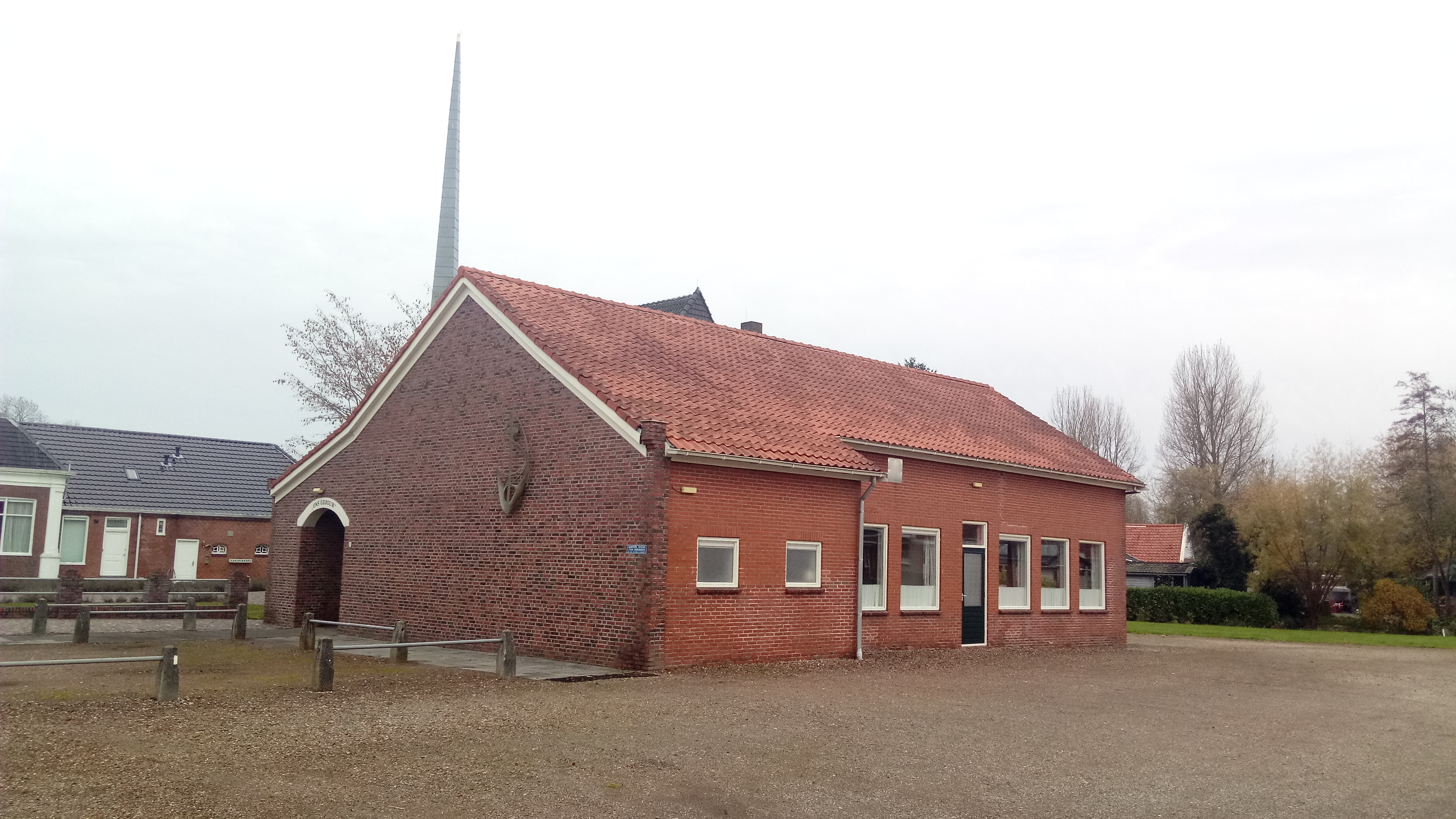
Christian community centre

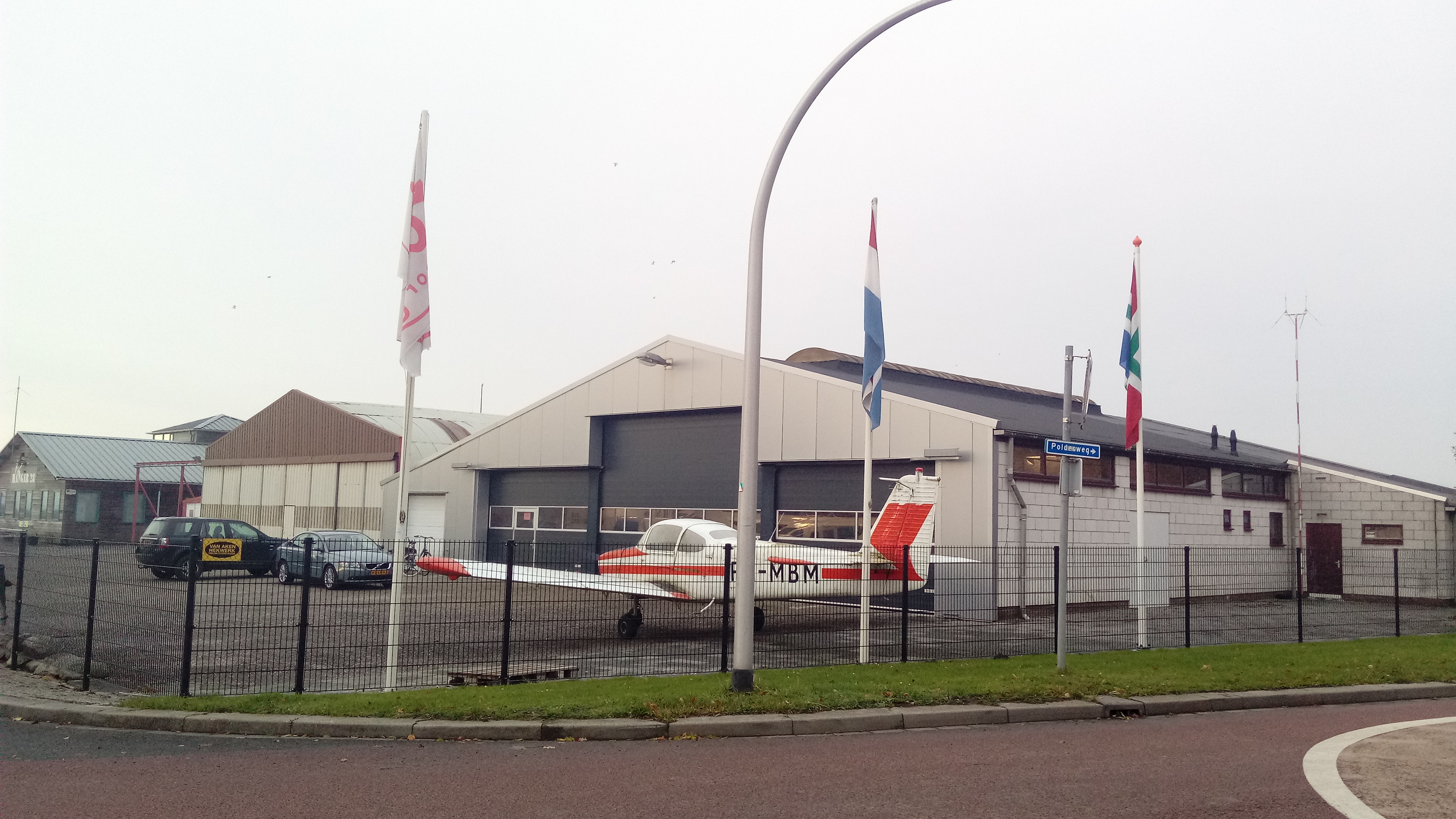
Airport Oostwold-Oldambt
