= Koert Stek =

Dutch communist politician (1926–2012)

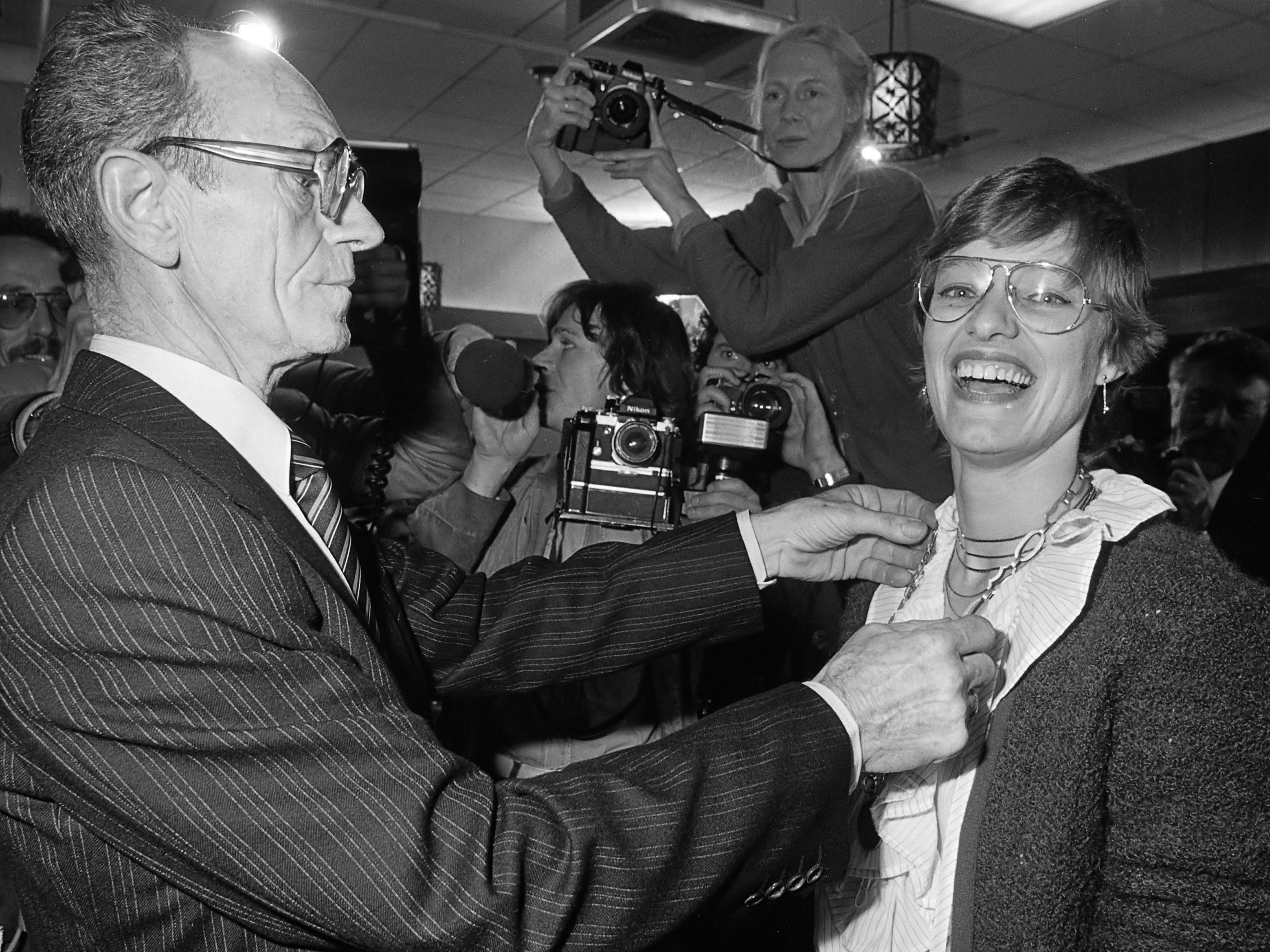
- Stek installs Hanneke Jagersma as mayor of Beerta, 1982

Member of the municipal executive of Reiderland
- In office 1994–1998

Member of the municipal council of Reiderland
- In office 1990–1998

Member of the municipal executive of Beerta
- In office 1973–1989

Member of the provincial executive of Groningen
- In office 1970–1978

Member of the municipal council of Beerta
- In office 1953–1970; 1978–1989

Personal details
- Born: 10 November 1926 Drieborg, Netherlands
- Died: 14 October 2012 (aged 85) Winschoten, Netherlands
- Party: NCPN
- Other political affiliations: CPN (1945–1991)
- Spouse: Tjakkie Stek-Wolthers
- Children: 2

Koert Stek (10 November 1926 – 14 October 2012) was a Dutch communist politician and administrator. He served on the provincial executive of Groningen, and on the municipal councils and executives of Beerta and Reiderland.

== Political career ==
Stek was first elected to the municipal council of Beerta in the 1953 municipal elections, representing the Communist Party of the Netherlands (CPN). In the 1959–1960 academic year, the party sent him and three other cadres to the Soviet Union for political-ideological training at the Higher Party School in Moscow.

Stek represented the CPN in Beerta as a municipal councillor for nearly three decades, serving as an alderman for half of that time. In the 1970s, he served eight years as a deputy on the provincial executive of Groningen. In the 1989 municipal reorganization elections, Stek was elected to the council of the new municipality of Reiderland, where he would serve another four years as an alderman.

Stek held strong objections to the CPN's direction in the lead-up to its merger with the other Rainbow parties, and he refused to join the new GroenLinks. Together with Hans Heres, Albert Schwertmann, and other like-minded individuals, he founded the New Communist Party–NCPN, which he represented until his retirement from politics. Upon his departure as a councilor and alderman in 1998, he was named an honorary citizen of Reiderland.

== Personal life ==
Koert Stek's father, Luppo Stek, was also a politician for the CPN and had been involved with the International Red Aid and the Dutch resistance during World War II. His arrest and subsequent death in Buchenwald concentration camp motivated Koert and two of his brothers to also join the CPN in 1945. One of them, Kees Stek (1915–2005), served as a municipal councilor in Dordrecht for nearly 30 years and became a member of GroenLinks following the party merger.

Stek was married to Tjaaktje Kampgine "Tjakkie" Stek-Wolthers (1927–2020). The couple had two daughters. Before the war, he had worked as a laborer and in the early post-war years as a groundworker in the Carel Coenraadpolder.

Stek died in Winschoten on 14 October 2012, aged 85.
