= Hans Heres =

Dutch communist politician (1945–2018)

Member of the municipal executive of Reiderland
- In office 1993–2001

Member of the municipal council of Reiderland
- In office 1990–2009

Member of the municipal executive of Beerta
- In office 1973–1978; 1988–1989

Member of the municipal council of Beerta
- In office 1970–1989

Personal details
- Born: Hans Loert Heres; 10 December 1945 Flachsmeer, Allied-occupied Germany
- Died: 28 December 2018 (aged 73) Beerta, Netherlands
- Party: NCPN
- Other political affiliations: CPN

Hans Loert Heres (10 December 1945 – 28 December 2018) was a Dutch communist politician and administrator who served as a municipal councilor and alderman in Beerta and Reiderland. Heres was considered one of the leading figures of communism in East Groningen.

== Political career ==
At the age of eighteen, Heres joined the Communist Party of the Netherlands (CPN), and in the 1970 municipal elections, he was elected to the municipal council of Beerta. He served as an alderman from 1973 to 1978 and again from 1988 until the municipal reorganization of Beerta in January 1990.

Dissatisfied with the 1991 merger of the CPN with the other Rainbow parties to form GroenLinks, Heres, along with Koert Stek, Albert Schwertmann, and other like-minded individuals, founded the New Communist Party–NCPN. In the 1994 municipal elections, the party secured a majority on the council of Reiderland, winning over fifty percent of the vote and seven out of the thirteen available seats. Heres and Stek became aldermen.

In 2001, he resigned following a motion of no confidence concerning the Blauwestad construction project, which the NCPN had initially supported. He remained a member of the municipal council until Reiderland was incorporated into the new municipality of Oldambt. In the 2009 municipal reorganization elections leading up to merger, the NCPN failed to win any seats, unlike its ideological counterparts, the United Communist Party and the Socialist Party.

== Personal life ==
Hans Heres was born in the British occupation zone in Germany, the son of a Dutch foreign laborer who had been deployed there during World War II. His father was a member of the CPN and served on the municipal council of Beerta in the years following the war. Like his father, Heres became a groundworker.

Heres died from lung cancer on 28 December 2018, at the age of 73. He was cremated in Winschoten.
