= Ruud Vreeman =

Dutch politician

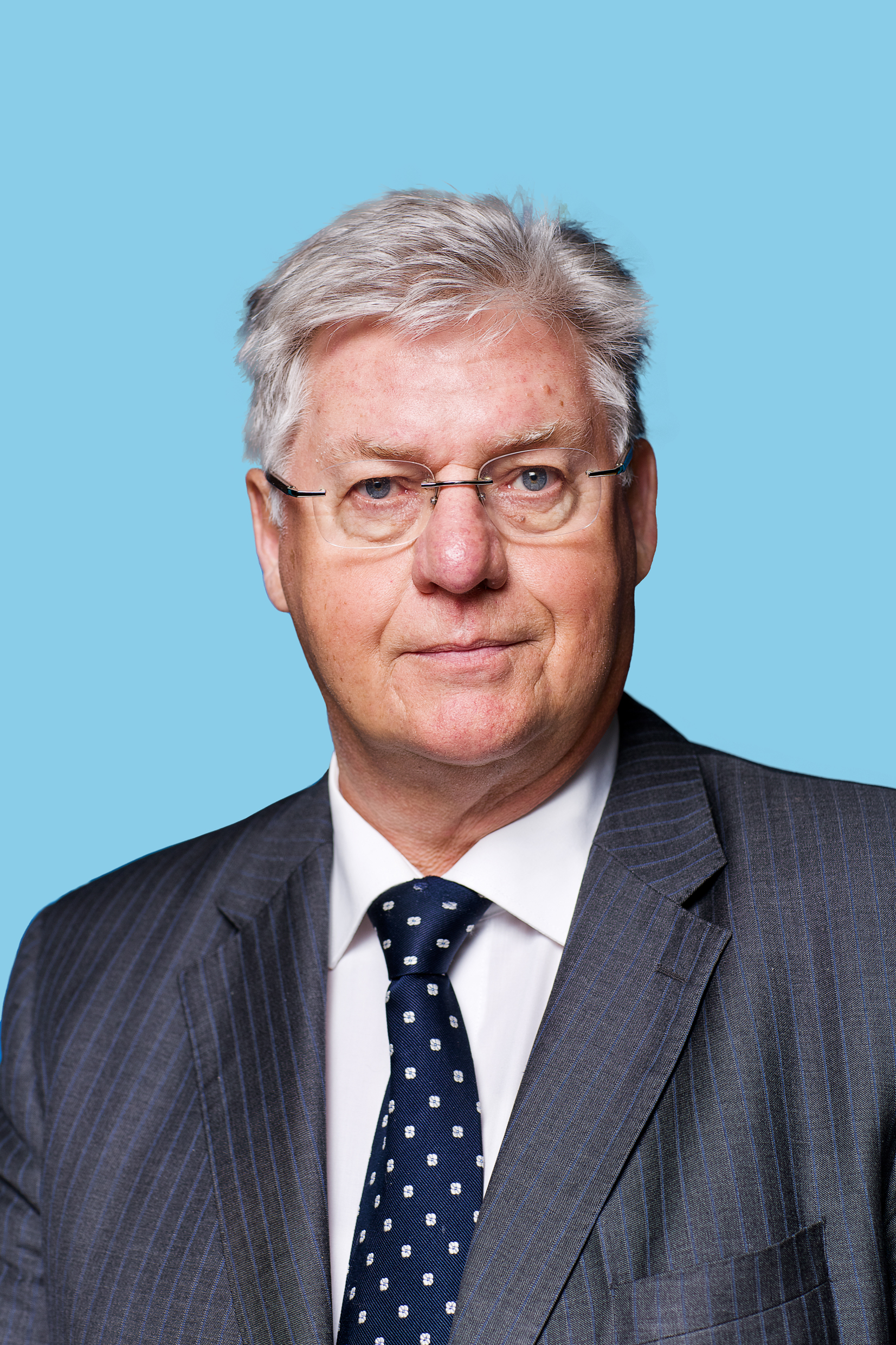
- Ruud Vreeman in 2015

Member of the Senate
- In office 9 June 2015 – 1 December 2016
- Parliamentary group: Labour Party

Mayor of Groningen
- In office 1 November 2013 – 1 January 2015; Ad interim
- Preceded by: Peter Rehwinkel
- Succeeded by: Peter den Oudsten

Mayor of Tilburg
- In office 28 June 2004 – 4 November 2009
- Preceded by: Johan Stekelenburg
- Succeeded by: Ivo Opstelten (Ad interim)

Mayor of Zaanstad
- In office 1 December 2016 – 27 September 2017; Ad interim
- Preceded by: Geke Faber
- Succeeded by: Jan Hamming
- In office 18 March 1997 – 28 June 2004
- Preceded by: Theo Quené
- Succeeded by: Hans Kombrink (Ad interim)

Member of the House of Representatives
- In office 17 May 1994 – 18 March 1997
- Parliamentary group: Labour Party

Chairman of the Labour Party
- In office 3 August 1998 – 20 February 1999; Ad interim
- Leader: Wim Kok
- Preceded by: Karin Adelmund
- Succeeded by: Marijke van Hees
- In office 13 March 1992 – 15 February 1997 Serving with Felix Rottenberg
- Leader: Wim Kok
- Preceded by: Frits Castricum (Ad interim)
- Succeeded by: Karin Adelmund

Personal details
- Born: Rudolf Lourens Vreeman; 31 December 1947 (age 78) Zwolle, Netherlands
- Party: Labour Party
- Spouse: Ronny Vreeman (m. 1972)
- Children: 2 children
- Education: University of Groningen (Bachelor of Social Science, Master of Social Science); Delft University of Technology (Doctor of Philosophy)
- Occupation: Politician · Trade union leader · Corporate director · Nonprofit director · Sport administrator · Media administrator · Author

Rudolf Lourens "Ruud" Vreeman (born 31 December 1947) is a Dutch politician of the Labour Party (PvdA) and trade union leader.

== Decorations ==
Honours
Ribbon bar	Honour	Country	Date	Comment
	Officer of the Order of Orange-Nassau	Netherlands	30 April 2008	

Party political offices
Preceded by Frits Castricum; Ad interim	Chairman of the Labour Party; 1992–1997; 1998–1999; Ad interim With: Felix Rottenberg (1992–1997)	Succeeded by Karin Adelmund
Preceded by Karin Adelmund	Chairman of the Labour Party; 1992–1997; 1998–1999; Ad interim With: Felix Rottenberg (1992–1997)	Succeeded by Marijke van Hees
Political offices
Preceded by Theo Quené	Mayor of Zaanstad; 1997–2004; 2016–2017; Ad interim	Succeeded by Hans Kombrink; Ad interim
Preceded by Geke Faber	Mayor of Zaanstad; 1997–2004; 2016–2017; Ad interim	Succeeded by Jan Hamming
Preceded by Johan Stekelenburg	Mayor of Tilburg; 2004–2009	Succeeded by Ivo Opstelten; Ad interim
Preceded by Peter Rehwinkel	Mayor of Groningen; Ad interim 2013–2015	Succeeded by Peter den Oudsten
Sporting positions
Unknown	President of the Netherlands Ice; Hockey Association; 2011–present	Incumbent
