= Ivo Opstelten =

Dutch politician (born 1944)

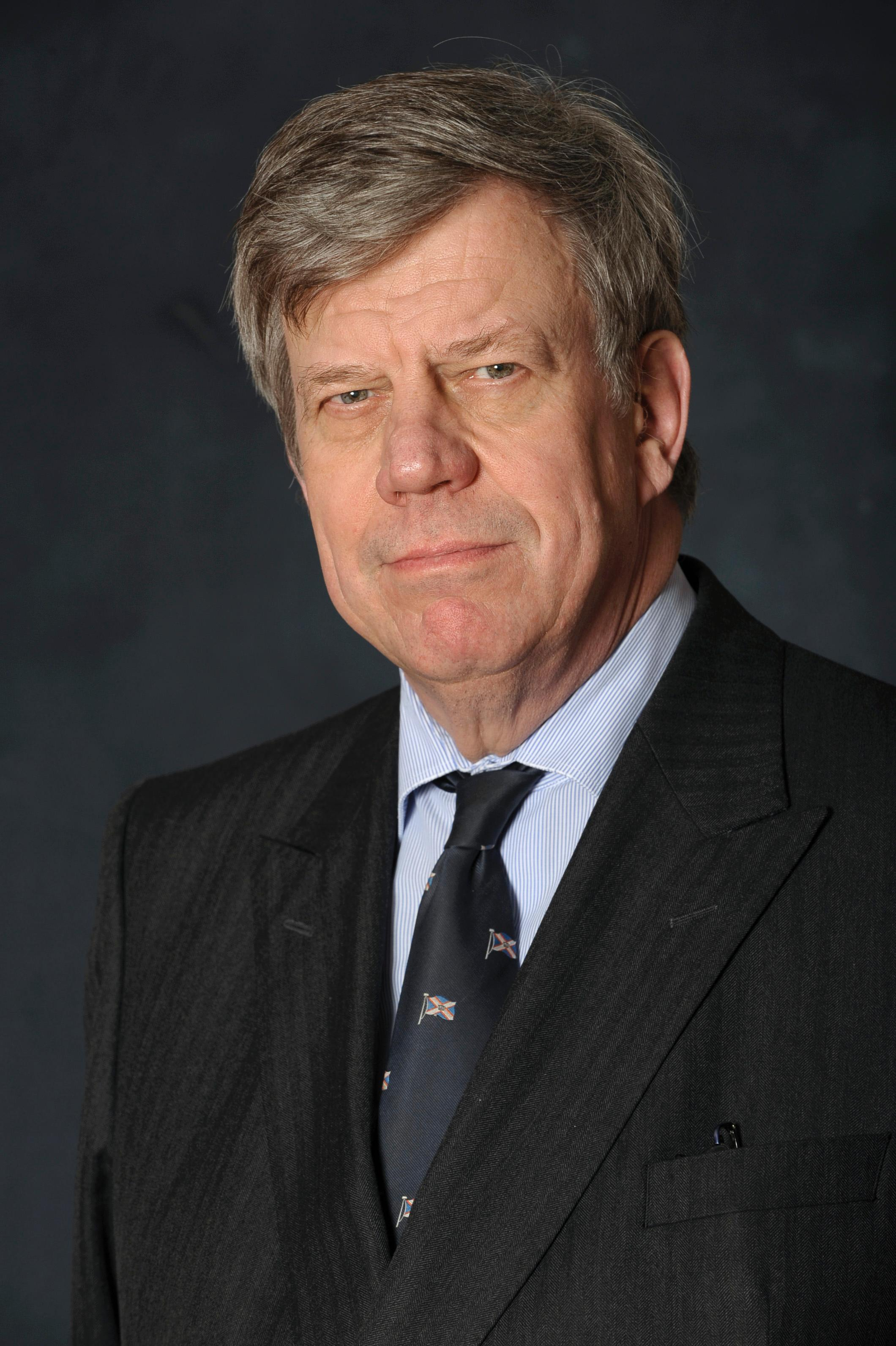
- Opstelten in 2011

Minister of Security and Justice
- In office 14 October 2010 – 10 March 2015
- Prime Minister: Mark Rutte
- Preceded by: Ernst Hirsch Ballin as Minister of Justice
- Succeeded by: Stef Blok (Ad interim)

Chairman of the People's Party for Freedom and Democracy
- In office 23 May 2008 – 14 October 2010
- Leader: Mark Rutte
- Preceded by: Jan van Zanen
- Succeeded by: Benk Korthals

Mayor of Tilburg
- In office 4 November 2009 – 16 July 2010; Ad interim
- Preceded by: Ruud Vreeman
- Succeeded by: Peter Noordanus

Mayor of Rotterdam
- In office 16 February 1999 – 1 January 2009
- Preceded by: Bram Peper
- Succeeded by: Ahmed Aboutaleb

Mayor of Utrecht
- In office 1 November 1992 – 16 February 1999
- Preceded by: Lien Vos-van Gortel
- Succeeded by: Annie Brouwer-Korf

Mayor of Beerta
- In office 1 December 1983 – 1 March 1984; Ad interim
- Preceded by: Hanneke Jagersma
- Succeeded by: Hanneke Jagersma

Mayor of Delfzijl
- In office 1 December 1980 – 1 September 1987
- Preceded by: Paul Scholten
- Succeeded by: Ed Haaksman

Mayor of Doorn
- In office 1 October 1977 – 1 December 1980
- Preceded by: Anton van Harinxma thoe Slooten
- Succeeded by: Henk Goudsmit

Mayor of Dalen
- In office 26 August 1972 – 1 October 1977
- Preceded by: Frits Fontein
- Succeeded by: Joost Hoffscholte

Personal details
- Born: Ivo Willem Opstelten; 31 January 1944 (age 82) Rotterdam, Netherlands
- Party: People's Party for Freedom and Democracy (since 1966)
- Spouse: Mariette Dutilh (m. 1970)
- Children: 4 daughters
- Education: Leiden University (Bachelor of Laws, Master of Laws)
- Occupation: Politician · Civil servant · Jurist · Nonprofit director · Television presenter

Ivo Willem Opstelten (born 31 January 1944) is a retired Dutch politician and jurist. He is a member of the People's Party for Freedom and Democracy (VVD).

Opstelten applied at Leiden University in May 1963 majoring in Law and obtaining a Bachelor of Laws degree in June 1965 before graduating with a Master of Laws degree in July 1969. Opstelten worked as a civil servant for the municipality of Vlaardingen from January 1970 until Augustus 1972. In Augustus 1972 Opstelten was nominated as Mayor of Dalen, taking office on 26 August 1972. In September 1977 Opstelten was nominated as Mayor of Doorn, he resigned as Mayor of Dalen the same day he was installed as Mayor of Doorn, taking office on 1 October 1977. In November 1980 Opstelten was nominated as Mayor of Delfzijl, he resigned as Mayor of Doorn the same day he was installed as Mayor of Delfzijl, taking office on 1 December 1980. Opstelten served as acting Mayor of Beerta from 1 December 1983 until 1 March 1984 during a parental leave of Hanneke Jagersma. In August 1987 Opstelten was appointment as Director-General of the department for Public Safety and Security of the Ministry of the Interior, he resigned as Mayor of Delfzijl of the same day he was installed as Director-General on 1 September 1987. In October 1992 Opstelten was nominated as Mayor of Utrecht, he resigned as Director-General the same day he was installed as Mayor of Utrecht, taking office on 1 November 1992. In January 1999 Opstelten was nominated as Mayor of Rotterdam, he resigned as Mayor of Utrecht the same day he was installed as Mayor of Rotterdam, serving from 16 February 1999 until 1 January 2009. Opstelten served as Chairmen of the People's Party for Freedom and Democracy from 23 May 2008 until 14 October 2010. Opstelten served as acting Mayor of Tilburg from 4 November 2009 until 16 July 2010 following the resignation of Ruud Vreeman.

After the election of 2010 Opstelten was appointed as Informateur for the cabinet formation of 2010. Following the cabinet formation Opstelten was appointed as Minister of Security and Justice in the Cabinet Rutte I, taking office on 14 October 2010. The Cabinet Rutte I fell on 23 April 2012 after the Party for Freedom (PVV) withdrew their confidence and supply and continued to serve in a demissionary capacity. In May 2012 Opstelten announced that he wouldn't stand for the election of 2012. Following the cabinet formation of 2012 Opstelten continued as Minister of Security and Justice in the Cabinet Rutte II, taking office on 5 November 2012. On 10 March 2015 Opstelten and State Secretary for Security and Justice Fred Teeven resigned after he had misinformed the House of Representatives about the Teevendeal that was mishandled by Teeven during the time he had served as a prosecutor. Opstelten retired after spending 42 years in national politics and became active in the public sector and occupied numerous seats as a corporate director and nonprofit director on several boards of directors and supervisory boards.

== Biography ==
=== Early life ===
Opstelten studied law at Leiden University, where he specialised in constitutional and public law. He graduated in 1969 and worked from 1970 to 1972 at the municipality of Vlaardingen before starting a long-term career as mayor.

=== Politics ===
In 1972 Opstelten began as Mayor of Dalen, at the age of 28 the youngest Mayor of the Netherlands. In 1977 he became Mayor of Doorn. In 1980 he became the Mayor of Delfzijl. In 1983 he became Acting Mayor of Beerta for four months because of the pregnancy of Mayor Hanneke Jagersma. In 1992 he made the switch to the fourth largest Municipality of the Netherlands, Utrecht. In 1999 he was nominated as Mayor of Rotterdam, the second biggest city of the Netherlands. In 2002 he was praised for his handling of the aftermath of the assassination of politician Pim Fortuyn. He served as Mayor of Rotterdam for ten years. He resigned on 1 January 2009. He was succeeded by Ahmed Aboutaleb. On 31 March 2008 he was elected as the new Party chair of the People's Party for Freedom and Democracy. On 6 November 2009 it was announced by Wim van de Donk, the Queen's Commissioner of North Brabant, that Opstelten had accepted the position as Acting Mayor of Tilburg after Mayor Ruud Vreeman's resignation was sought by the City council of Tilburg.

On 4 August 2010 Queen Beatrix nominated Opstelten as fifth informateur in the 2010 Dutch cabinet formation. On September 4, the Queen replaced Opstelten with Herman Tjeenk Willink, the Vice President of the Council of State as the new informateur. On 13 September 2010 he became informateur a second time and on September 28 the negotiations were finished. A coalition agreement was reached between People's Party for Freedom and Democracy and Christian Democratic Appeal to form a minority coalition, supported by the Party for Freedom to obtain a majority. Formateur Mark Rutte asked Opstelten as the Minister of Security and Justice in the new cabinet. Because a Party chair can not serve in the cabinet, he resigned as a Party chair of the People's Party for Freedom and Democracy on 14 October 2010, the day he took office as the new Minister of Security and Justice.

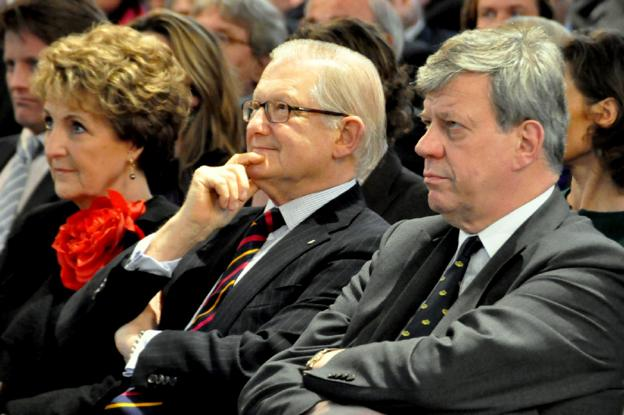
Princess Margriet, Pieter van Vollenhoven and Minister of Security and Justice Ivo Opstelten at a meeting on 7 February 2011.

During his tenure as Minister of Security and Justice, Opstelten was the driving force behind the closure of the majority of The Netherlands' coffeeshops and growshops effectively ending the successful 1970's instituted experiment where soft drugs were tolerated and separated from the hard drugs market. Affiliated with the Christian Democratic Appeal (CDA) party, Opstelten also imposed many restrictions on the legal and regulated prostitution business in the Netherlands also driving a portion of that business underground.

In the week after his resignation from office, he was interviewed about the increased use of heavy firearms by criminals. He said that maybe in the past firearms didn't have the attention of the authorities, but now they rose to the challenge and he was on it. In reality he had quietly disbanded the task force on heavy weapons two months earlier.

==== Resignation from office ====
On 10 March 2015 Opstelten, along with State Secretary Fred Teeven resigned after it was discovered that Teeven, then chief public prosecutor authorized the return of 4.7 million guilders to convicted drugs dealer Cees H. in 2000, without the knowledge of his superior or the tax office.

Throughout 2014, questions had been asked about this drugs deal. Opstelten consistently told parliament that the deal was for 2 million guilders and that they should trust him on that. On 4 March news show Nieuwsuur uncovered evidence that it was actually 4.7 million guilders. Cees H. confirmed this and stated that he did not do the justice department any favor in return, such as testifying. During a press conference on 9 March, Opstelten admitted that convicted drugs baron Cees H. had been paid 4.7 million guilders, not the two million guilders he had consistently told parliament. The next day he resigned. Other politicians were disappointed that he left many questions unanswered by resigning, such as how he could not know the amount despite the deal being orchestrated by his own deputy minister and why the tax service was not involved in the deal.

Preceding the affair which resulted in his resignation, Opstelten was already often accused of not knowing the facts during debates and having difficulty finding words in other cases.

=== Personal ===
Ivo Opstelten is married to Mariette Dutilh (born 1945) and they have four children.

== Decorations ==
Honours
Ribbon bar	Honour	Country	Date	Comment
	Officer of the Order of Orange-Nassau	Netherlands	29 April 2004	

Awards
Ribbon bar	Awards	Organization	Date	Comment
	Honorary Member	People's Party for Freedom and Democracy	29 May 2015	

Party political offices
Preceded by Liesbeth Tuijnman	Vice Chairman of the People's; Party for Freedom and Democracy; 1986–1992	Succeeded by Jan Gmelich Meijling
Preceded by Jan van Zanen	Chairman of the People's Party for Freedom and Democracy; 2008–2010	Succeeded by Benk Korthals
Political offices
Preceded by Frits Fontein	Mayor of Dalen; 1972–1977	Succeeded by Joost Hoffscholte
Preceded by Anton van Harinxma thoe Slooten	Mayor of Doorn; 1977–1980	Succeeded by Henk Goudsmit
Preceded by Paul Scholten	Mayor of Delfzijl; 1980–1987	Succeeded by Ed Haaksman
Preceded by Hanneke Jagersma	Mayor of Beerta; Ad interim 1983–1984	Succeeded by Hanneke Jagersma
Preceded by Lien Vos-van Gortel	Mayor of Utrecht; 1992–1999	Succeeded by Annie Brouwer-Korf
Preceded by Bram Peper	Mayor of Rotterdam; 1999–2009	Succeeded by Ahmed Aboutaleb
Preceded by Ruud Vreeman	Mayor of Tilburg; Ad interim 2009–2010	Succeeded by Peter Noordanus
Preceded by Ernst Hirsch Ballin as Minister of Justice	Minister of Security and Justice; 2010–2015	Succeeded by Stef Blok; Ad interim
Civic offices
Unknown	Director-General of the Department for Public Safety and Security of the Ministry of the Interior; 1987–1992	Unknown
