= Karin Adelmund =

Dutch politician (1949–2005)

Her Excellency Karin Adelmund
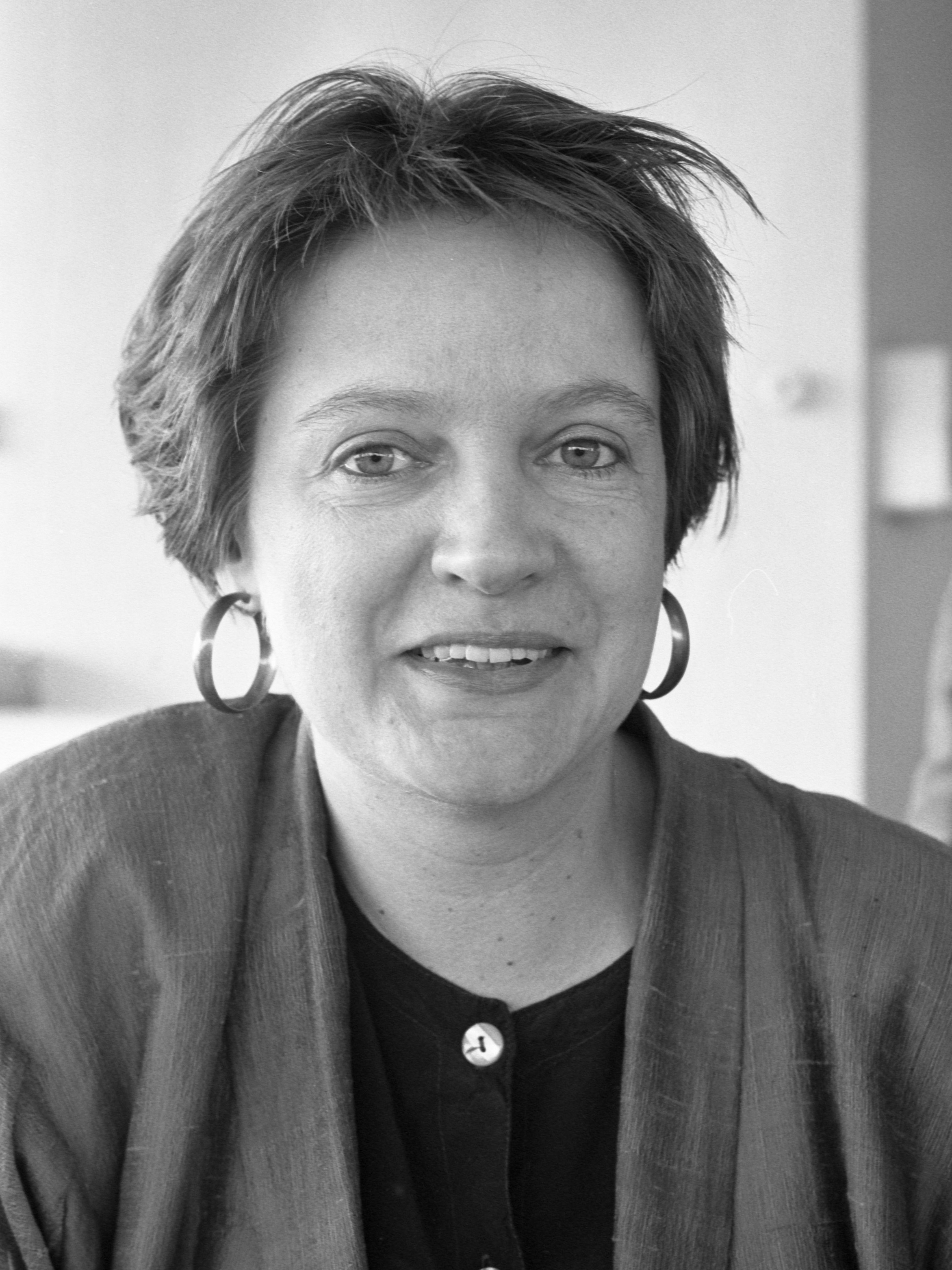
- Karin Adelmund in 1988

State Secretary for Education, Culture and Science
- In office 3 August 1998 – 22 July 2002 Serving with Rick van der Ploeg
- Cabinet: Kok II
- Preceded by: Tineke Netelenbos; Aad Nuis
- Succeeded by: Annette Nijs; Cees van Leeuwen

Chairwoman of the Labour Party
- In office 15 February 1997 – 3 August 1998
- Leader: Wim Kok
- Preceded by: Felix Rottenberg; Ruud Vreeman
- Succeeded by: Ruud Vreeman (ad interim)

Member of the House of Representatives
- In office 23 May 2002 – 21 October 2005
- In office 17 May 1994 – 3 August 1998

Personal details
- Born: Karin Yvonne Irene Jansen Adelmund; 18 March 1949 Rotterdam, Netherlands
- Died: 21 October 2005 (aged 56) Amsterdam, Netherlands
- Party: Labour Party
- Children: 2 children
- Education: University of Amsterdam
- Occupation: Politician · Trade union leader

Karin Yvonne Irene Jansen Adelmund (Dutch pronunciation: [ˈkaːrɪn iˈvɔnə ʔiˈreːnə ˈjɑnsə(n) ˈaːdəlmʏnt]; 18 March 1949 – 21 October 2005) was a Dutch politician of the Labour Party (PvdA) and trade union leader.

== Early life and education ==
Karin Yvonne Irene Jansen Adelmund was born on 18 March 1949 in Rotterdam in the Netherlands. She was the daughter of Fritz Jansen Adelmund and Anna van der Hoven. She had two brothers and three sisters.

She went to Protestant primary and secondary schools in Rotterdam. She then studied at the Public Social Academy (1968–1972) in Rotterdam and she studied social sciences at the University of Amsterdam (1972–1979) in Amsterdam.

== Career ==
Adelmund was a member of the Dutch Labour Party (PvdA). She was a member of the Dutch House of Representatives (1994–1998), chairwoman of the Labour Party (1997–1998), State Secretary of Education, Culture and Science (1998–2002), and again member of the House of Representatives (2002–2005) until her death. She died on 21 October 2005, at the age 56, in Amsterdam.

Party political offices
Preceded by Felix Rottenberg; Ruud Vreeman	Chairwoman of the Labour Party; 1997–1998	Succeeded by Ruud Vreeman; Ad interim
Political offices
Preceded by Tineke Netelenbos; Aad Nuis	State Secretary for Education, Culture and Science; 1998–2002; With: Rick van der Ploeg	Succeeded by Annette Nijs; Cees van Leeuwen
