= Hanneke Jagersma =

Dutch politician

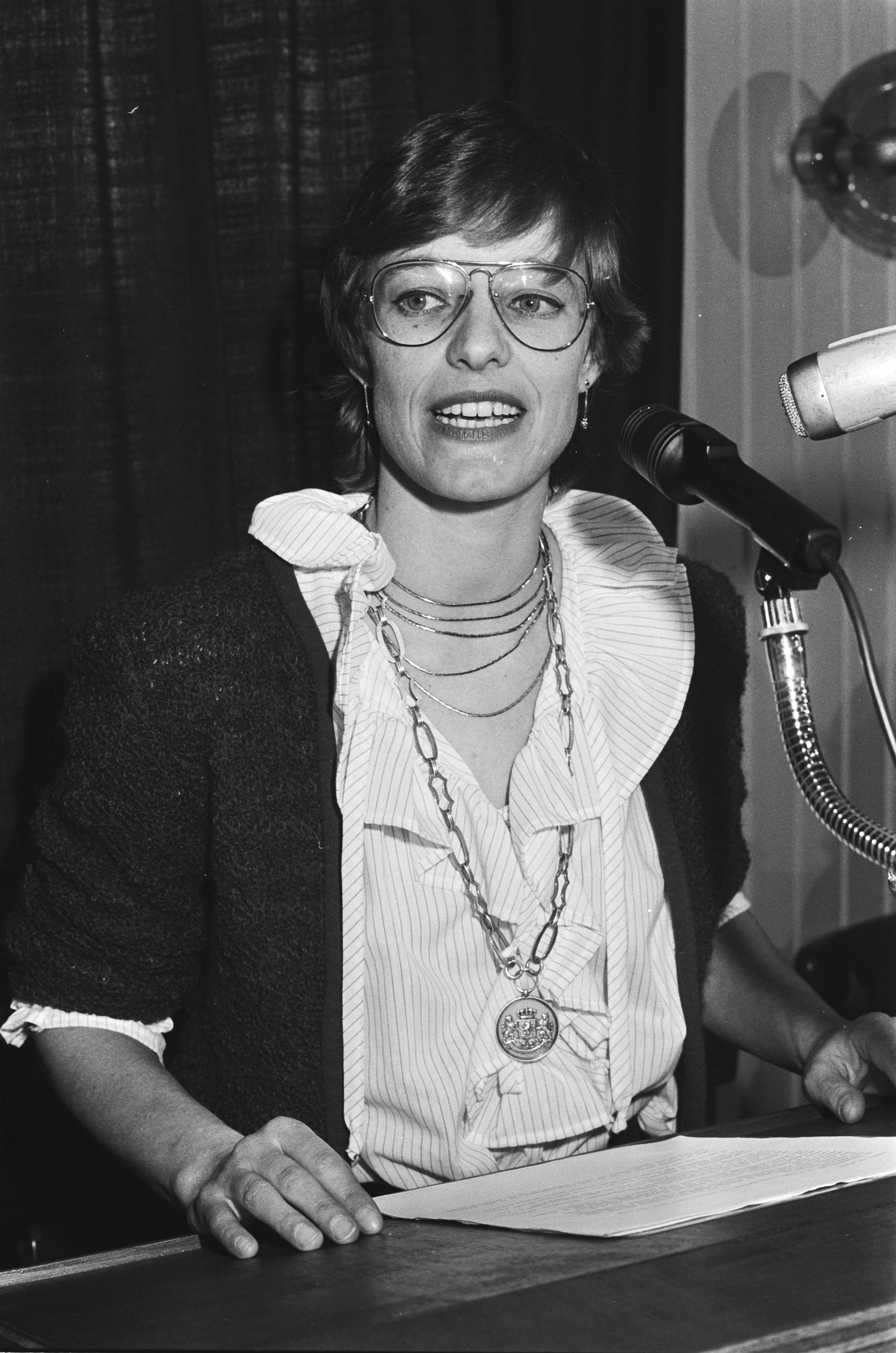
- Hanneke Jagersma in 1982

Mayor of Beerta
- In office 1 April 1982 – 1 January 1990
- Preceded by: Johannes Voslamber
- Succeeded by: Wim Cornelis as mayor of Reiderland

Personal details
- Born: Johanna Jagersma; 1 November 1951 (age 75) Wymbritseradiel, Netherlands
- Party: Communist Party of the Netherlands (1974–1989); Socialist Party (2013–2017)

Johanna "Hanneke" Jagersma (Dutch pronunciation: [joːˈɦɑnaː ˈɦɑnəkə ˈjaːɣərsmaː]; born 1 November 1951) is a Dutch former politician. She was member of the Communist Party of the Netherlands from 1974 to 1989 and mayor of Beerta from 1982 to 1990. She now works for Humanitas, a Dutch care organisation.

== Early life ==
Johanna Jagersma was born on 1 November 1951 in Wymbritseradiel in the Netherlands. She studied at the mulo, the havo, and the social academy. She became a member of the Communist Party of the Netherlands (CPN) in 1974. She worked from 1975 until 1982 as coordinator for elderly care in the municipalities of Finsterwolde, Nieuweschans, and Beerta.

== Politics ==
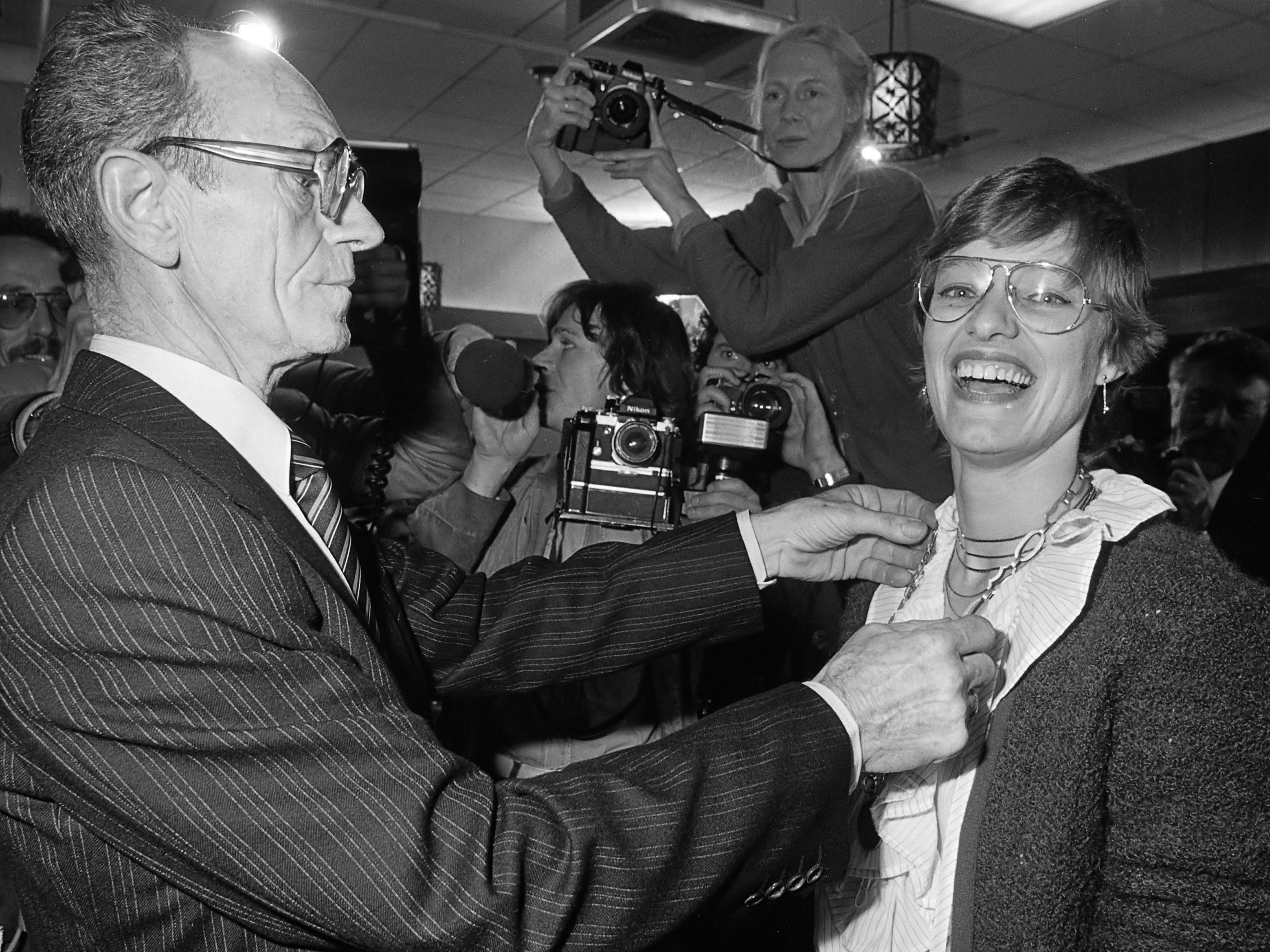
Alderman Koert Stek installs Jagersma as mayor of Beerta in 1982

Jagersma was a member of the States of Groningen from 1978 until 1982, where she was leader of the CPN.

On 1 April 1982, she became mayor of Beerta and was the first communist mayor in the Netherlands. In 1983, she was the first mayor in the Netherlands to receive maternity leave while she was in office. Jagersma did not join GroenLinks, into which the Communist Party merged in 1989. On 1 January 1990, Beerta was merged into Reiderland due to municipal reorganisations, and Jagersma was not appointed mayor of the new municipality.

== After politics ==
Jagersma works as manager for Humanitas, a Dutch care organisation. It was reported in 2013 that she became member of the Socialist Party. She was a member until September 2017.

Political offices
Preceded by Johannes Voslamber	Mayor of Beerta; 1982–1990	Succeeded by Wim Cornelis as mayor of Reiderland
