= Aad Nuis =

Dutch politician and political scientist

His Excellency Aad Nuis
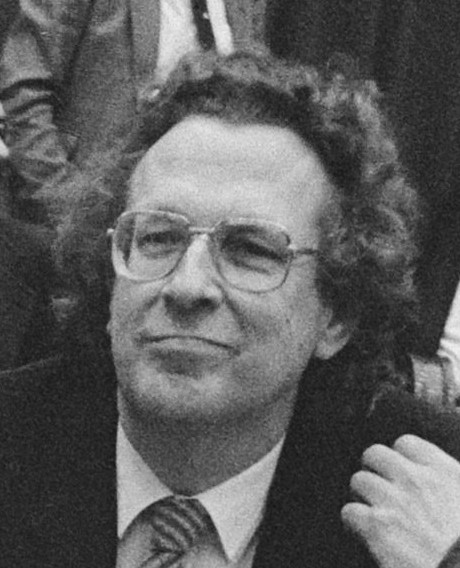
- Aad Nuis in 1986

State Secretary for Education, Culture and Science
- In office 22 August 1994 – 3 August 1998 Serving with Tineke Netelenbos
- Prime Minister: Wim Kok
- Preceded by: Job Cohen as State Secretary for Education and Sciences
- Succeeded by: Karin Adelmund; Rick van der Ploeg

Member of the Senate
- In office 13 September 1983 – 3 June 1986
- Parliamentary group: Democrats 66

Member of the House of Representatives
- In office 3 June 1986 – 22 August 1994
- In office 10 June 1981 – 16 September 1982
- Parliamentary group: Democrats 66

Personal details
- Born: Adrianus Nuis; 18 July 1933 Sliedrecht, Netherlands
- Died: 8 November 2007 (aged 74) Scheveningen, Netherlands
- Party: Democrats 66 (from 1967)
- Spouse: Renate Rubinstein (m. 1963; div. 1978)
- Education: University of Amsterdam (Bachelor of Social Science, Master of Social Science)
- Occupation: Politician · Political scientist · Philologist · Researcher · Journalist · Author · Columnist · Poet · Editor · Critic · Political pundit · Corporate director · Nonprofit director

Military service
- Allegiance: Netherlands
- Branch/service: Royal Netherlands Navy
- Years of service: 1962–1963 (Conscription)
- Rank: Ensign

Adrianus "Aad" Nuis (18 July 1933 – 8 November 2007) was a Dutch politician of the Democrats 66 (D66) party and political scientist.

Nuis completed his military service in New Guinea, and after spending time in Jamaica returned to the Netherlands, where he became part of the anti-monarchist movement. In the 1970s he worked as a literary critic for the Haagse Post. He became more involved in politics in the D66 party.

He served in the States-Provincial of Gelderland between 7 June 1978 and 10 June 1981. He served as Secretary of State for Culture and Media and Minister of Education, Culture and Science in the 1990s.

Nuis was also active as poet, author and translator. His first poetry book Twee schelven hooi was published in 1968, and Nuis was elected to the Maatschappij der Nederlandse Letterkunde. After retiring from politics, he mainly focused on literature and books. In 2000 Nuis became the Chairman of the Dutch Literary Production and Translation Fund, and between 2001 and 2007 Nuis was Chairman of the Koninklijke Vereniging van het Boekenvak (KVB), the organization which represents all recognized Dutch publishers and booksellers. As Chairman of the KVB, Nuis played a leading role in ensuring fixed prices for books, which resulted in the passing of the Law Fixed Book Prices of 2004.

== Decorations ==
Honours
Ribbon bar	Honour	Country	Date	Comment
	Knight of the Order of Orange-Nassau	Netherlands	30 October 1998	

Political offices
Preceded by Job Cohen as State Secretary for Education and Sciences	State Secretary for Education, Culture and Science; 1994–1998; With: Tineke Netelenbos	Succeeded by Karin Adelmund
Preceded by Job Cohen as State Secretary for Education and Sciences	State Secretary for Education, Culture and Science; 1994–1998; With: Tineke Netelenbos	Succeeded by Rick van der Ploeg
