= Tineke Netelenbos =

Dutch politician and businesswoman

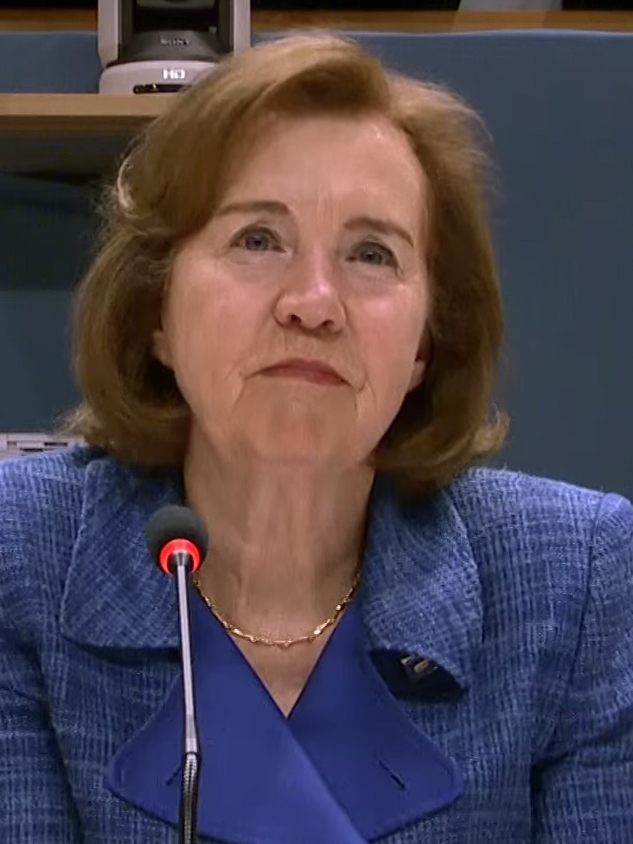
- Tineke Netelenbos in 2015

Mayor of Ede
- In office 7 June 2007 – 21 January 2008; Ad interim
- Preceded by: Roel Robbertsen
- Succeeded by: Cees van der Knaap

Mayor of Haarlemmermeer
- In office 16 October 2006 – 20 April 2007; Ad interim
- Preceded by: Fons Hertog
- Succeeded by: Theo Weterings

Mayor of Oud-Beijerland
- In office 2 May 2005 – 16 October 2006; Acting
- Preceded by: Bart van der Hart
- Succeeded by: Anja Latenstein van Voorst (Ad interim)

Minister of Transport and Water Management
- In office 3 August 1998 – 22 July 2002
- Prime Minister: Wim Kok
- Preceded by: Annemarie Jorritsma
- Succeeded by: Roelf de Boer

State Secretary for Education, Culture and Science
- In office 22 August 1994 – 3 August 1998 Serving with Aad Nuis
- Prime Minister: Wim Kok
- Preceded by: Job Cohen as State Secretary for Education and Sciences
- Succeeded by: Karin Adelmund; Rick van der Ploeg

Member of the House of Representatives
- In office 23 May 2002 – 30 January 2003
- In office 19 May 1998 – 3 August 1998
- In office 10 September 1987 – 22 August 1994
- Parliamentary group: Labour Party

Personal details
- Born: Tine Koomen; 15 February 1944 (age 82) Wormerveer, Netherlands
- Party: Labour Party (from 1972)
- Spouse: Coen Netelenbos (m. 1977)
- Children: 2 children
- Relatives: Margreet Horselenberg (sister)
- Occupation: Politician · Civil servant · Businesswoman · Nonprofit director · Lobbyist · Teacher

Tine "Tineke" Netelenbos-Koomen (born 15 February 1944) is a retired Dutch politician of the Labour Party (PvdA) and businesswoman.

Netelenbos attended a Lyceum in Amsterdam from May 1960 until June 1966. Netelenbos worked as a civics teacher in Amsterdam from August 1966 until September 1987. Netelenbos served on the Municipal Council of Haarlemmermeer from May 1978 until September 1987. Netelenbos served on the Labour Party Executive Board from July 1983 until September 1987.

Netelenbos became a Member of the House of Representatives after the resignation of Harry van den Bergh, taking office on 10 September 1987 serving as a frontbencher chairing the parliamentary committee for Health and spokesperson for Education, Social Work, Disability Affairs, Abortion and deputy spokesperson for Culture, Emancipation and Equality. After the election of 1994 Netelenbos was appointed as State Secretary for Education, Culture and Science in the Cabinet Kok I, taking office on 22 August 1994. After the election of 1998 Netelenbos returned as a Member of the House of Representatives, taking office on 19 May 1998. Following the cabinet formation of 1998 Netelenbos was appointment as Minister of Transport and Water Management in the Cabinet Kok II, taking office on 3 August 1998. The Cabinet Kok II resigned on 16 April 2002 following the conclusions of the NIOD report into the Srebrenica massacre during the Bosnian War and continued to serve in a demissionary capacity. After the election of 2002 Netelenbos again returned as a Member of the House of Representatives, taking office on 23 May 2002. The Cabinet Kok II was replaced by the Cabinet Balkenende I following the cabinet formation of 2002 on 22 July 2002 and she continued to serve in the House of Representatives as a frontbencher chairing the parliamentary committee for Health, Welfare and Sport and spokesperson for Education, Culture, Disability Affairs, Equality and deputy spokesperson for Abortion and Emancipation. In May 2002 Netelenbos was a candidate as the next Queen's Commissioner of North Holland but lost the nomination to Secretary-General of the Ministry of Justice Harry Borghouts. In September 2002 Netelenbos announced that she wouldn't not stand for the election of 2003 and continued to serve until the end of the parliamentary term on 30 January 2003.

Netelenbos semi-retired from national politics and became active in the public sector and occupied numerous seats as a nonprofit director on several boards of directors and supervisory boards (International Institute of Social History, Museum De Cruquius, Floriade 2002, Radio Netherlands Worldwide, Electronic Commerce Platform, Royal Association of Shipowners and the Maritime Research Institute) and served on several state commissions and councils on behalf of the government (Netherlands Vehicle Authority, Advisory Council for Spatial Planning, Council for Culture, Cadastre Agency and Public Pension Funds PFZW). Netelenbos served as acting Mayor of Oud-Beijerland from 2 May 2005 until 16 October 2006 and as ad interim Mayor of Haarlemmermeer from 16 October 2006 until 20 April 2007 following the resignation of Fons Hertog and as ad interim Mayor of Ede from 7 June 2007 until 21 January 2008 after the appointed of Roel Robbertsen as Queen's Commissioner of Utrecht.

== Decorations ==
Honours
Ribbon bar	Honour	Country	Date	Comment
	Officer of the Order of Orange-Nassau	Netherlands	10 December 2002	

Political offices
Preceded by Job Cohen as State Secretary for Education and Sciences	State Secretary for Education, Culture and Science; 1994–1998; With: Aad Nuis	Succeeded by Karin Adelmund
Preceded by Job Cohen as State Secretary for Education and Sciences	State Secretary for Education, Culture and Science; 1994–1998; With: Aad Nuis	Succeeded by Rick van der Ploeg
Preceded by Annemarie Jorritsma	Minister of Transport and Water Management; 1998–2002	Succeeded by Roelf de Boer
Preceded by Bart van der Hart	Mayor of Oud-Beijerland; Acting; 2005–2006	Succeeded by Anja Latenstein van Voorst; Ad interim
Preceded by Fons Hertog	Mayor of Haarlemmermeer; Ad interim 2006–2007	Succeeded by Theo Weterings
Preceded by Roel Robbertsen	Mayor of Ede; Ad interim 2007–2008	Succeeded by Cees van der Knaap
Civic offices
Unknown	Chairwoman of the Supervisory board of Netherlands Vehicle Authority; 2004–2005	Unknown
