= Jan van Zanen =

Dutch politician (born 1961)

His Excellency Jan van Zanen
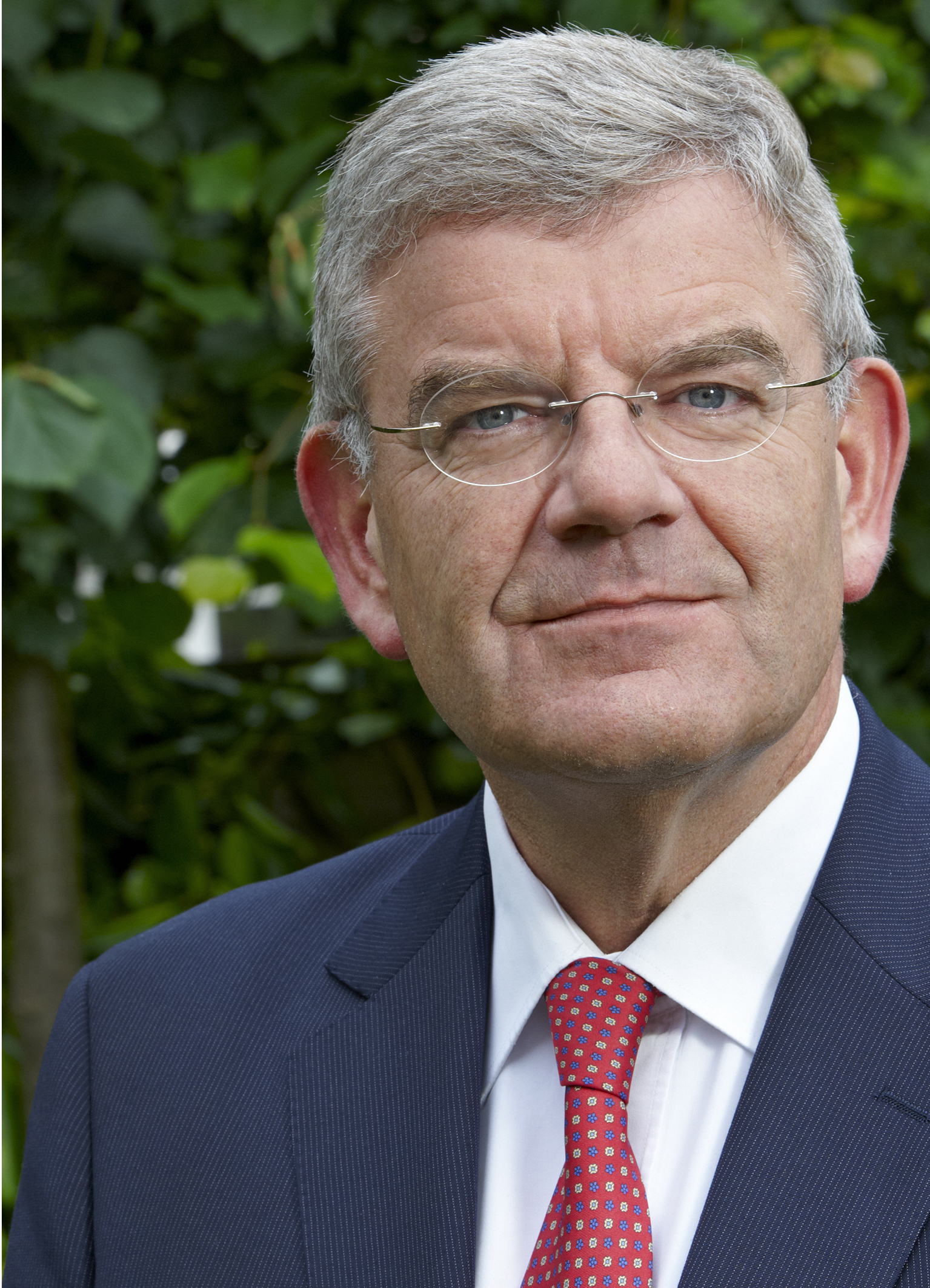
- Van Zanen in 2011

Mayor of The Hague
- Incumbent
- Assumed office 1 July 2020
- Preceded by: Johan Remkes (acting)

Mayor of Utrecht
- In office 1 January 2014 – 1 July 2020
- Preceded by: Aleid Wolfsen
- Succeeded by: Peter den Oudsten (acting)

Mayor of Amstelveen
- In office 1 July 2005 – 1 January 2014
- Preceded by: Harry Kamphuis
- Succeeded by: Fred de Graaf (acting)

Chairman of the People's Party for Freedom and Democracy
- In office 28 November 2003 – 23 May 2008
- Leader: See list: Gerrit Zalm (2003–2004) Jozias van Aartsen (2004–2006) Mark Rutte (2006–2008)
- Preceded by: Bas Eenhoorn
- Succeeded by: Ivo Opstelten

Personal details
- Born: Jan Hendrikus Cornelis van Zanen; 4 September 1961 (age 65) Purmerend, Netherlands
- Party: People's Party for Freedom and Democracy (from 1979)
- Spouse: Marian van den Berg (m. 1991–2014)
- Domestic partner: Simone Richardson (since 2015)
- Children: 1 son and 1 daughter
- Education: Vrije Universiteit Amsterdam (Bachelor of Laws, Master of Laws); Cornell Law School (Master of Studies in Law)
- Occupation: Politician · Civil servant · Jurist · Trade association executive
- Website: Mayor of The Hague (in English)

Military service
- Allegiance: Netherlands
- Branch/service: Royal Netherlands Air Force
- Years of service: 1989–1991 (Conscription); 1991–1996 (Reserve)
- Rank: Second lieutenant
- Battles/wars: Cold War

Jan Hendrikus Cornelis van Zanen (born 4 September 1961) is a Dutch politician who has served as Mayor of The Hague since 1 July 2020. A member of the People's Party for Freedom and Democracy (VVD), he previously served as Mayor of Utrecht (2014–2020) and Amstelveen (2005–2013). Jan van Zanen also was national chairman of the VVD (2003–2008). He was president of the Association of Netherlands Municipalities (VNG) from 2015 until 2023 and was subsequently appointed honorary chairman of the organisation.

== Career ==
Van Zanen grew up in Edam-Volendam and was the national vice president of the Youth Organisation Freedom and Democracy (JOVD). He studied law at VU Amsterdam and at Cornell Law School of Cornell University in Ithaca (New York). Van Zanen completed his military service as a reserve officer with the Royal Netherlands Air Force. From 1991 to 1998, he served as the secretary of the executive board of the national entrepreneurs association, VOG. He represented the VVD in the municipal council of Utrecht from 1990 to 2002. Van Zanen was deputy mayor of public space, finance and economic affairs in Utrecht from 1998 to 2005, and the mayor of Amstelveen from 2005 to 2013.

He was also chairperson of the VVD (2003–2008), as the successor to Bas Eenhoorn. In 1994, Van Zanen wrote a biography about a former VVD chairperson, Haya van Someren-Downer: Haya, vrouw voor vrijheid en democratie. [Haya, woman for freedom and democracy] In 1996, Van Zanen won the Thorbecke Award for political eloquence. On leaving his position as deputy mayor, on 23 June 2005 he was presented with the Silver City Medal of Utrecht. When he resigned as chairperson of the VVD on 23 May 2008, he was presented with the Thorbecke medal by his successor Ivo Opstelten. Following his departure as Mayor of Amstelveen on 20 December 2013, Van Zanen became an honorary citizen of this municipality. On 28 March 2015, the general assembly of the JOVD nominated Van Zanen as honorary member.

=== Mayor of Utrecht ===
From 1 January 2014 to 1 July 2020, he was the 330th mayor of Utrecht. On 3 June 2015, the members of the Association of Netherlands Municipalities (VNG) chose Van Zanen as its new president. In this framework, since 15 November 2019, he has been co-president of the UCLG and executive president of the CEMR. On 18 June 2015, Marcel Guinchard, president of the French Chamber of Commerce, and the French ambassador Laurent Pic presented Van Zanen with the 'Prix de la Personnalité de l'Année 2015'. On 27 May 2016, Japanese ambassador Hiroshi Inomata presented him with an imperial award in the order of the Rising Sun, Golden Rays with Cravatte for his 'exceptional contribution to promoting the relationship and cultural and economic relations between the Netherlands and Japan'.

On 15 November 2016, the French ambassador Philippe Lalliot presented him with the medals associated with the National Order of the Legion of Honour. Van Zanen was decorated for his contribution to relations between France and the Netherlands. This particularly related to his involvement in the Grand Départ of the Tour de France in Utrecht, as well as his role in launching the French-Netherlands economic year in the summer of 2015. On 8 November 2017, he took sick leave following his diagnosis of malignant prostate cancer at the beginning of September of that year. On 30 December 2017, he resumed his work as mayor.

On 8 June 2018, Van Zanen received the Clear Language Award in the category of clearest mayor of the Netherlands. This award is an initiative of the VU Language Centre and is presented annually to a well-known Dutch national with exceptional language skills. On 12 April 2019, governor Bauke Boersma from Rotary International presented Van Zanen with the medals associated with the honorary title Paul Harris Fellow of The Rotary Foundation. '... To reflect our appreciation for the real and meaningful contribution to promoting international relations and friendship between all nations of the world ...'. On 18 July 2019, the municipal council proposed that Van Zanen should be reappointed as mayor. His reappointment formally started on 7 January 2020. On that occasion, he referred to Utrecht as "The city of my dreams". On his retirement as Mayor of Utrecht on 30 June 2020, Van Zanen received the golden city medal.

=== Mayor of The Hague ===
On 1 July 2020, Van Zanen was appointed Mayor of The Hague. On 11 October 2020, during the Utrecht Rainbow Festival, he was presented with the Annie Brouwer-Korf Award 2020 for his contribution to the acceptance and visibility of the LGBTQ+-community. On 12 February 2021, Van Zanen was reappointed for a second term as president of the Association of Netherlands Municipalities following his move from Utrecht to The Hague. On 24 October 2021, the Spanish ambassador María Jesús Alonso Jiménez presented Van Zanen on behalf of King Felipe VI the Orden de Isabel la Católica in the rank of Commander (Encomienda). Van Zanen was decorated for his contribution to the relations between Spain and the Netherlands. On 9 November 2022, during the state visit of the President of Italy, he was appointed Grand Officer of the Order of Merit of the Italian Republic.

On 14 June 2023, Sharon Dijksma succeeded Van Zanen as president of the VNG. Upon stepping down, he was appointed honorary chairman of the organisation. On 21 July 2023, he received the Ukrainian Order of Merit, awarded by President Volodymyr Zelenskyy. On 25 March 2025, he received the Medal of Merit of Lions Clubs International in recognition of his leadership and humanitarian work, including activities connected to the United Nations. On 17 June 2026, during the state visit of the Japanese Imperial couple to the Netherlands, he was promoted within the Order of the Rising Sun from the Third Class (Gold Rays with Neck Ribbon) to the Second Class (Gold and Silver Star).

In November 2025, Van Zanen was nominated for a second term as Mayor of The Hague, commencing on 1 July 2026.

== Personal life ==
Van Zanen is a member of the Dutch Reformed Church. He is divorced and has a daughter and a son, as well as two granddaughters. He was in a relationship with sports administrator and VVD politician Simone Richardson until early 2026.

== Honours ==
- Japan:
  - 5 June 2026: Gold Rays with Neck Ribbon (3rd class) of the Order of the Rising Sun

Party political offices
Preceded by Bas Eenhoorn	Chairman of the People's Party for Freedom and Democracy; 2003–2008	Succeeded by Ivo Opstelten
Political offices
Preceded by Harry Kamphuis	Mayor of Amstelveen; 2005–2014	Succeeded by Fred de Graaf; Acting
Preceded by Aleid Wolfsen	Mayor of Utrecht; 2014–2020	Succeeded by Peter den Oudsten; Acting
Preceded by Johan Remkes; Acting	Mayor of The Hague; 2020–present	Incumbent
Non-profit organization positions
Preceded by Annemarie Jorritsma	Chairman of the Association of Municipalities; 2015–present	Incumbent
