= List of mayors of Utrecht =

This is a list of mayors of Utrecht since the end of the Napoleonic occupation in 1813.

== List ==
- J. van der Velden 1813–1815
- R. A. Schutt 1815–1824
- W. R. Baron van Heeckeren van Brandsenburg 1816–1824
- J. F. Gobius 1818–1821
- J. Borski 1821–1824
- J. van Doelen 1824–1827
- H.M.A.J. van Asch van Wijck 1827–1839
- N. P. J. Kien 1839–1878
- W. R. Boer 1878–1891
- B. Reiger 1891–1908
- A. F. baron van Lynden 1908–1914
- J. P. Fockema Andreae 1914–1933
- G. A. W. ter Pelkwijk 1934–1942 and 1945–1948
- C. van Ravenswaay 1942–1945
- Jhr. C. A. de Ranitz 1948–1970
- H. G. I. Baron Van Tuyll van Serooskerken 1970–1974
- H. J. L. Vonhoff 1974–1980
- M. W. Vos-van Gortel 1980–1992
- I. W. Opstelten 1992–1999
- A. H. Brouwer-Korf 1999–2007
- A. Wolfsen 2008–2014
- J.H.C. van Zanen 2014–2020
- Peter den Oudsten 2020
- Sharon Dijksma since 2020

== See also ==
- Timeline of Utrecht
