= Simone Richardson =

Dutch politician

Member of the House of Representatives
- In office 4 June 2025 – 11 November 2025
- In office 6 September 2022 – 5 December 2023

Personal details
- Born: 6 May 1972 (age 54) Heerlen, Netherlands
- Party: VVD
- Education: University of Groningen

Simone M. Richardson (born 6 May 1972) is a Dutch sports director and politician from the VVD. She stood for election to the House of Representatives in the 2021 general election and entered parliament in 2022 serving until the 2023 general election. She returned for five months in 2025.

== Personal life ==
Richardson is in a relationship with Jan van Zanen.

== Electoral history ==
Electoral history of Simone Richardson
Year	Body	Party	Pos.	Votes	Result		Ref.
Year	Body	Party	Pos.	Votes	Party seats	Individual	Ref.
2021	House of Representatives	People's Party for Freedom and Democracy	47	1,525	34	Lost (Note: Richardson was appointed to the body later during the term due to a vacancy.)	
2023	House of Representatives	People's Party for Freedom and Democracy	32	1,509	24	Lost	
2025	House of Representatives	People's Party for Freedom and Democracy	32	1,123	22	Lost	
