= Drieborg =

- Village
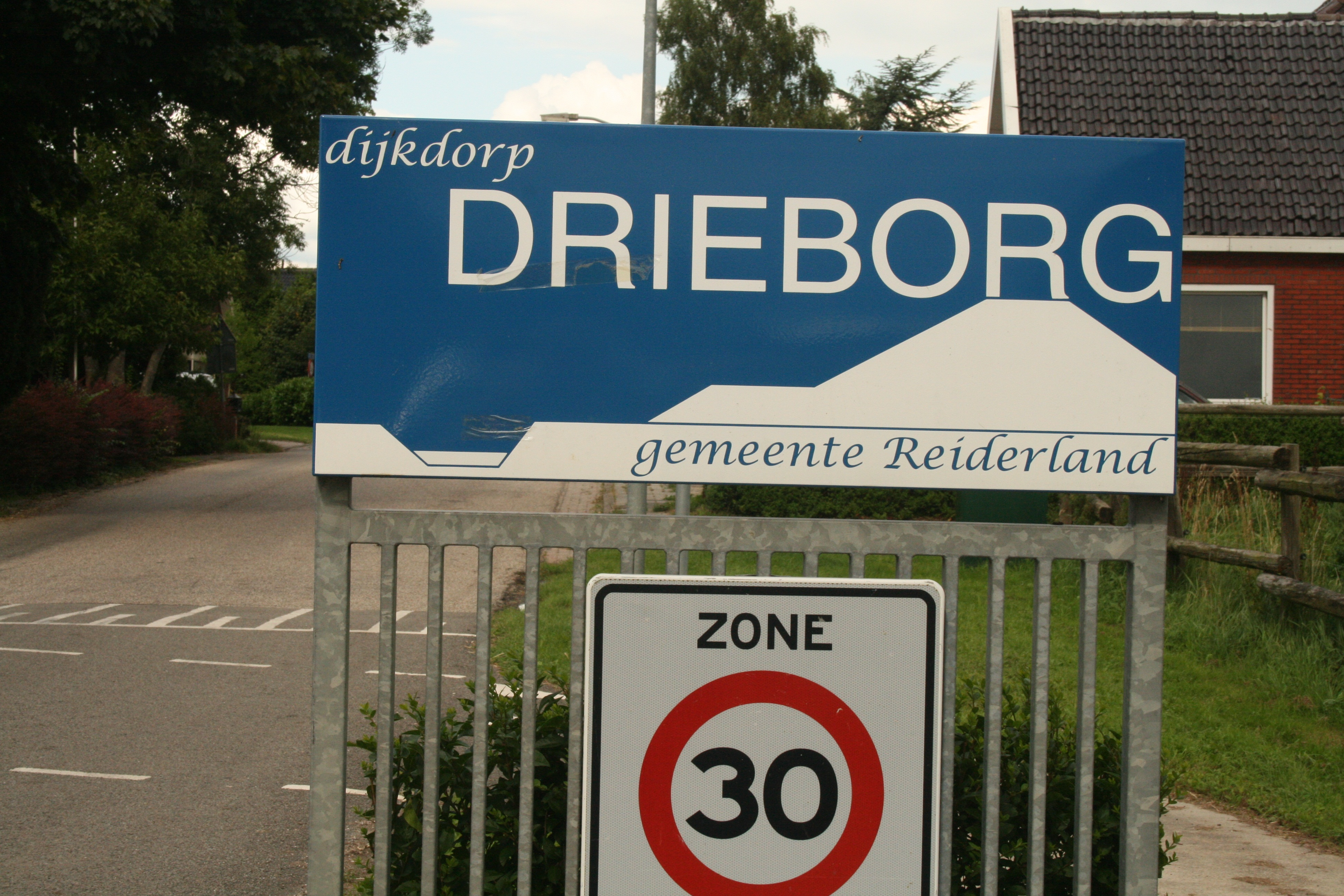
- Drieborg

- Location in province of Groningen in the Netherlands Drieborg (Netherlands)
- Coordinates: 53.2061°N 7.1808°E
- Country: Netherlands
- Province: Groningen
- Municipality: Oldambt

Area
  - Total: 19.90 km^{2} (7.68 sq mi)
- Elevation: 0 m (0 ft)

Population (2021)
  - Total: 470
  - Density: 24/km^{2} (61/sq mi)
- Time zone: UTC+1 (CET)
  - Summer (DST): UTC+2 (CEST)
- Postal code: 9688
- Dialing code: 0597

Drieborg (Dutch: [ˈdribɔr(ə)x]; also Stocksterhorn; Gronings: Drijbörg [ˈdrɛːɪ̯bœːχ]) is a dike village in the Dutch province of Groningen. It is a part of the municipality of Oldambt.

== History ==
The village started along a dike on the Dollart as Stocksterhorn. In 1656, the dike was extended to Nieuweschans. Due to the proximity to the border, a redoubt was constructed in Stocksterhorn. In 1673, the Bishop of Münster conquered the redoubt. On 26 August 1818, the village was first referred to as Drieborg in the Provincial Council of Groningen. The origin of the name is unclear. The most likely explanation is "three boroughs" (fortified settlements), which however cannot be correct. The village used to be a part of the municipality of Beerta.

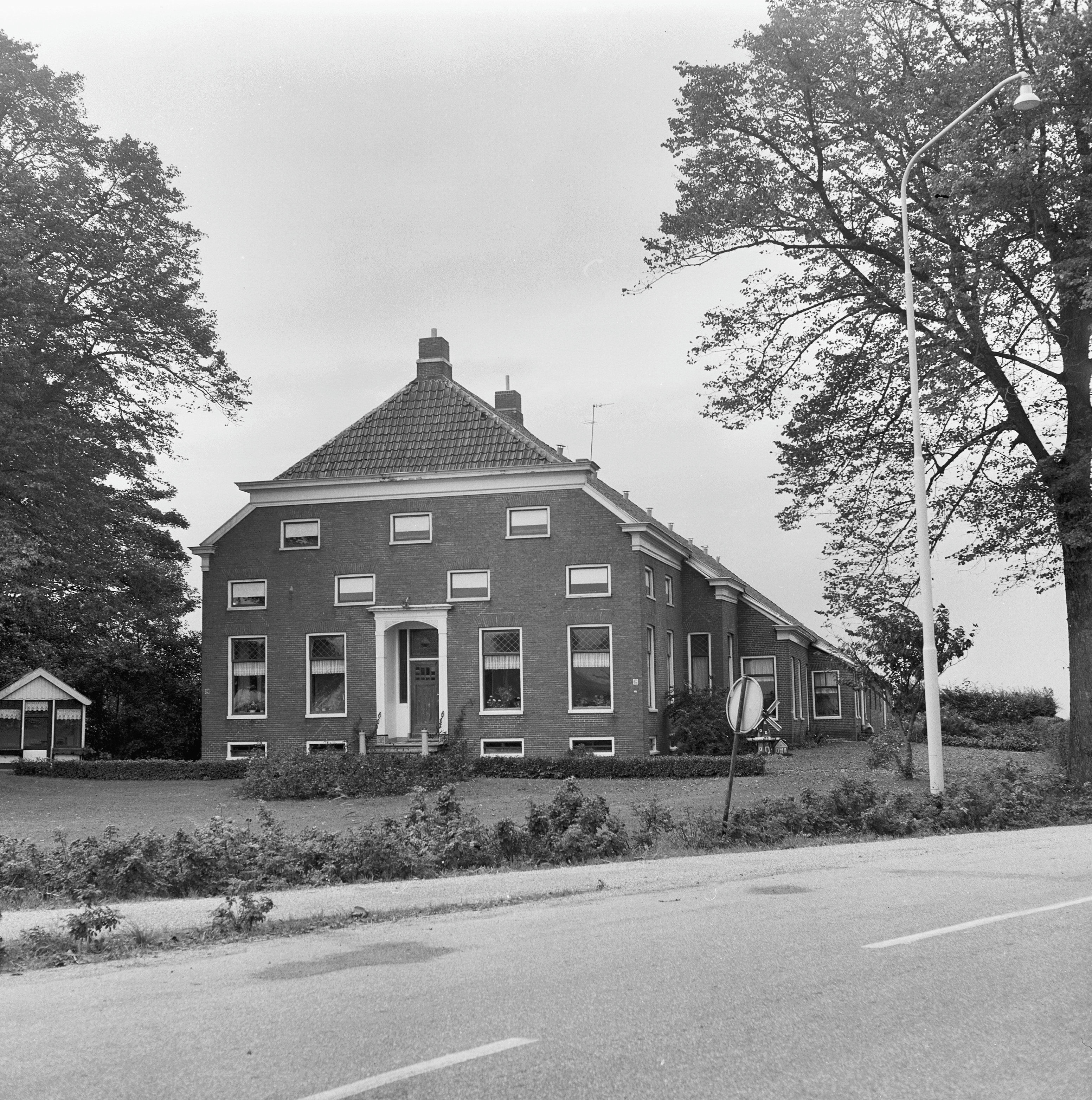
Farm in Drieborg

Drieborg was mainly inhabited by farm workers. During the 20th century, Drieborg was a stronghold of the Communist Party of the Netherlands. In 1929, a widespread farmers' strike was organised in Drieborg. After World War II, 60 of the 170 houses in the village were demolished.

In 1903, a church was built in Drieborg, but was demolished in 1928. Drieborg still has a school. The population of the village is steadily decreasing, but the average income is increasing, although still near the poverty line.

In 1990, the municipality was merged into Reiderland which in turn was merged into Oldambt in 2010.
