= Nieuw-Beerta =

- Village
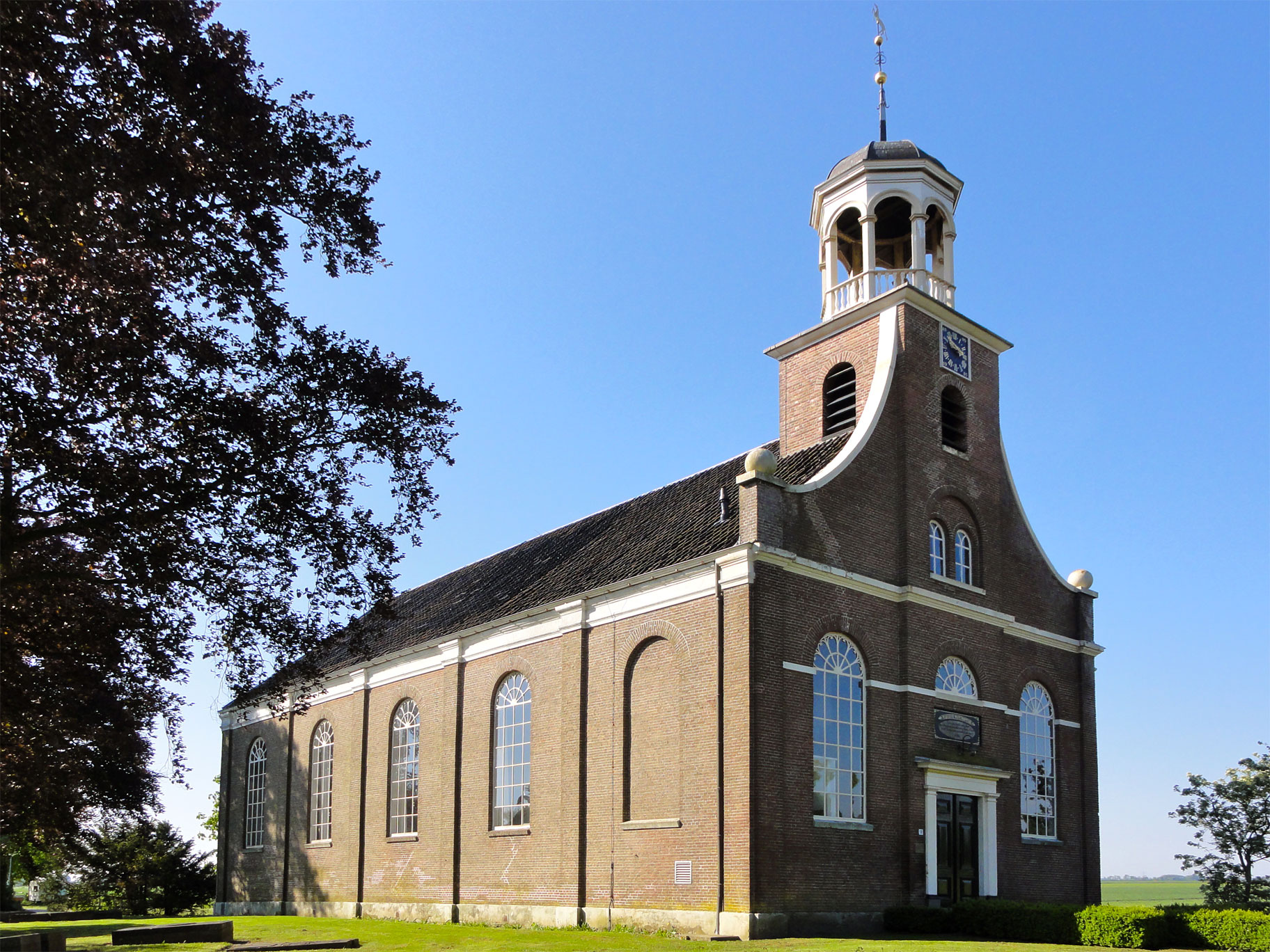
- Protestant Church in 2011

- Location of Nieuw-Beerta in Groningen in the Netherlands
- Coordinates: 53°11′N 7°10′E
- Country: Netherlands
- Province: Groningen
- Municipality: Oldambt

Area (2015)
  - Total: 38 ha (94 acres)
  - Land: 38 ha (94 acres)
  - Water: 0 ha (0 acres)

Population (2015)
  - Total: 120
  - Density: 320/km^{2} (820/sq mi)
- Postal code: 9687
- Area code: 0597

Nieuw-Beerta (Dutch pronunciation: [niu ˈbeːrtaː]) is a village with a population of 120 in the municipality of Oldambt in the east of the province of Groningen in the northeast of the Netherlands.

The Royal Netherlands Meteorological Institute has a weather station in the village.

== History ==
The village was first mentioned in 1660 as Beerter hamrick, and meant "the village dorp belonging to [the village of] Beerta". In 1822, it was first mentioned as Nieuw-Beerta (New Beerta) to distinguish it from Beerta. Nieuw-Beerta is a road village which developed on the dike after the Uiterdijken were poldered in 1657.

The first church was built in 1665, and rebuilt in 1689. The current church dates from 1856. Several villas and farms were built in Jugendstil.

Nieuw Beerta was considered to be home to 753 people in 1840, but probably included a much larger area. The village used to have rich farmers, but following a decline in the late 19th century the contrast between the rich farmers and the poor farm workers caused a five-month long strike in 1929, and the region became a Communist stronghold.

Nieuw Beerta used to be part of the municipality of Beerta until 1990. Since 2010, it is part of the municipality of Oldambt.

== Gallery ==
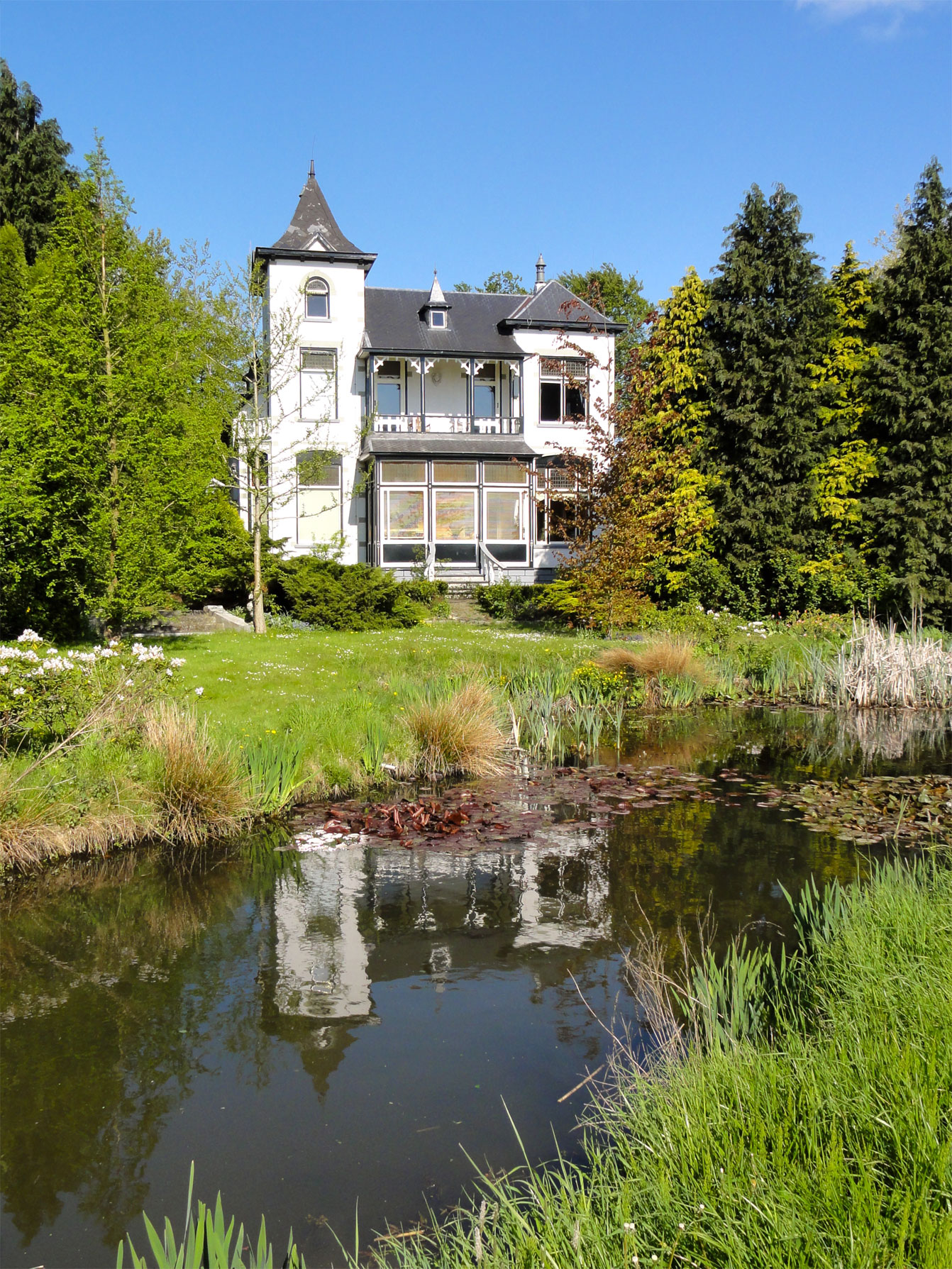
Villa in Nieuw-Beerta

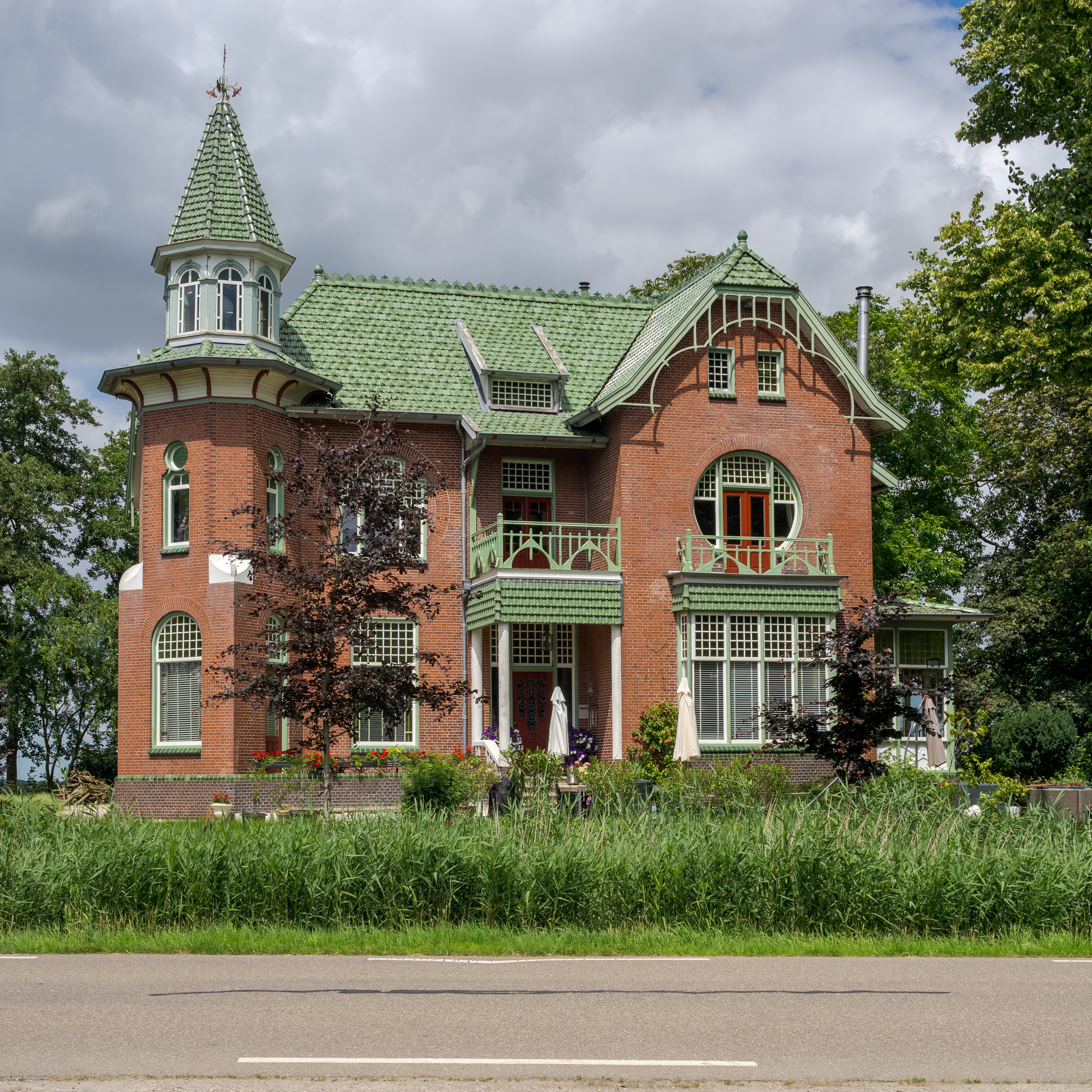
Villa Hoofdweg 81

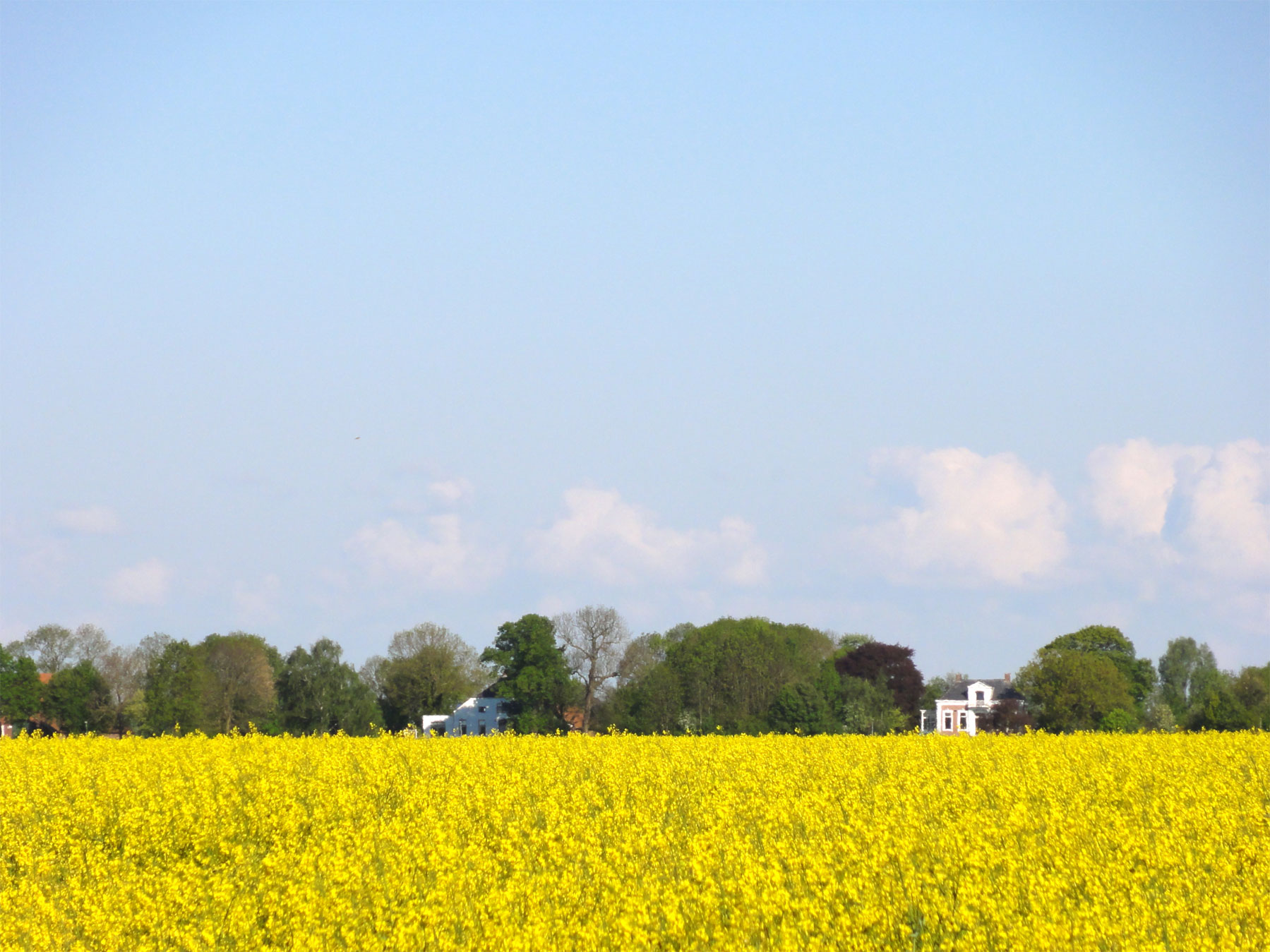
View on Nieuw-Beerta

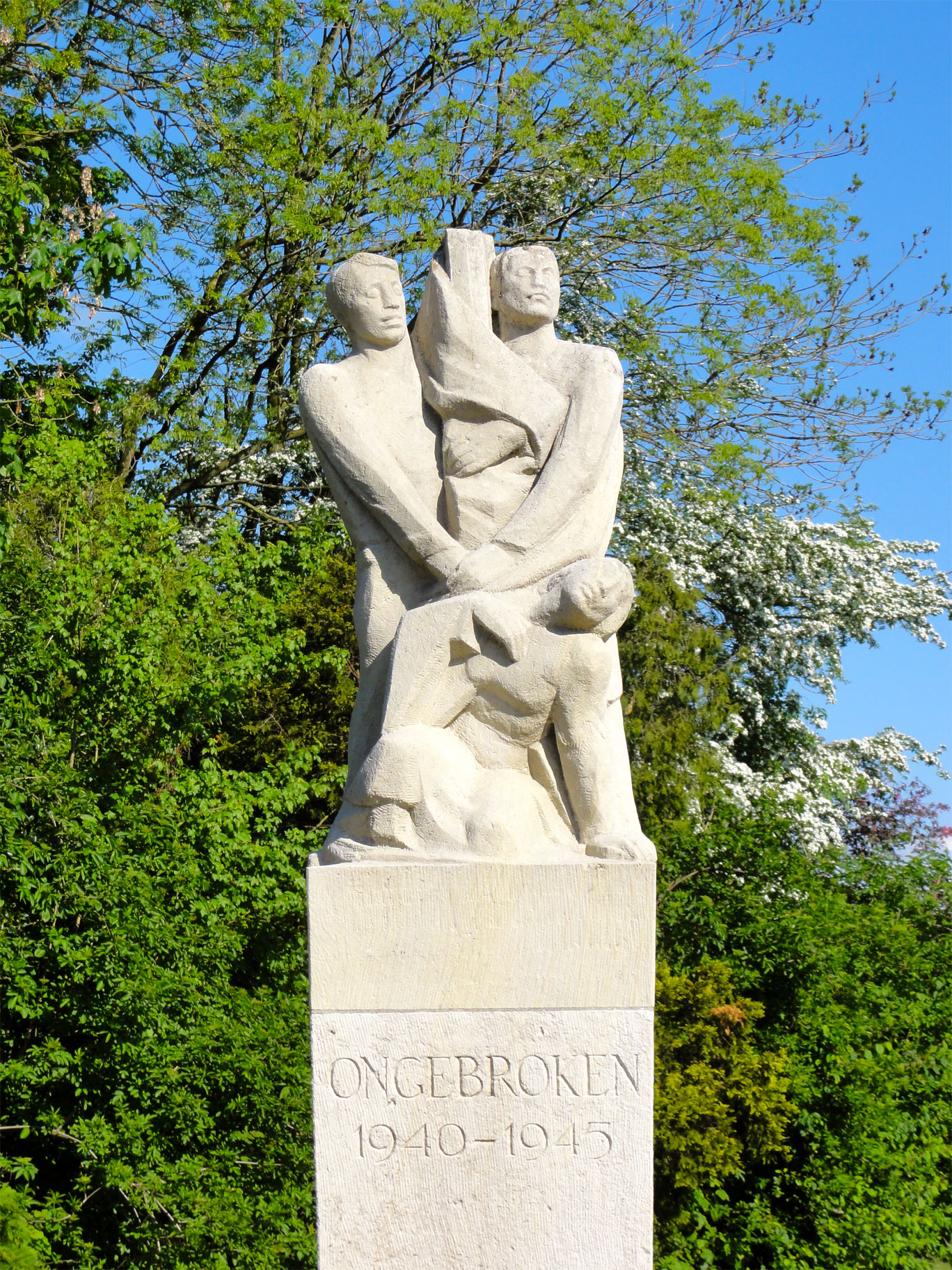
War memorial

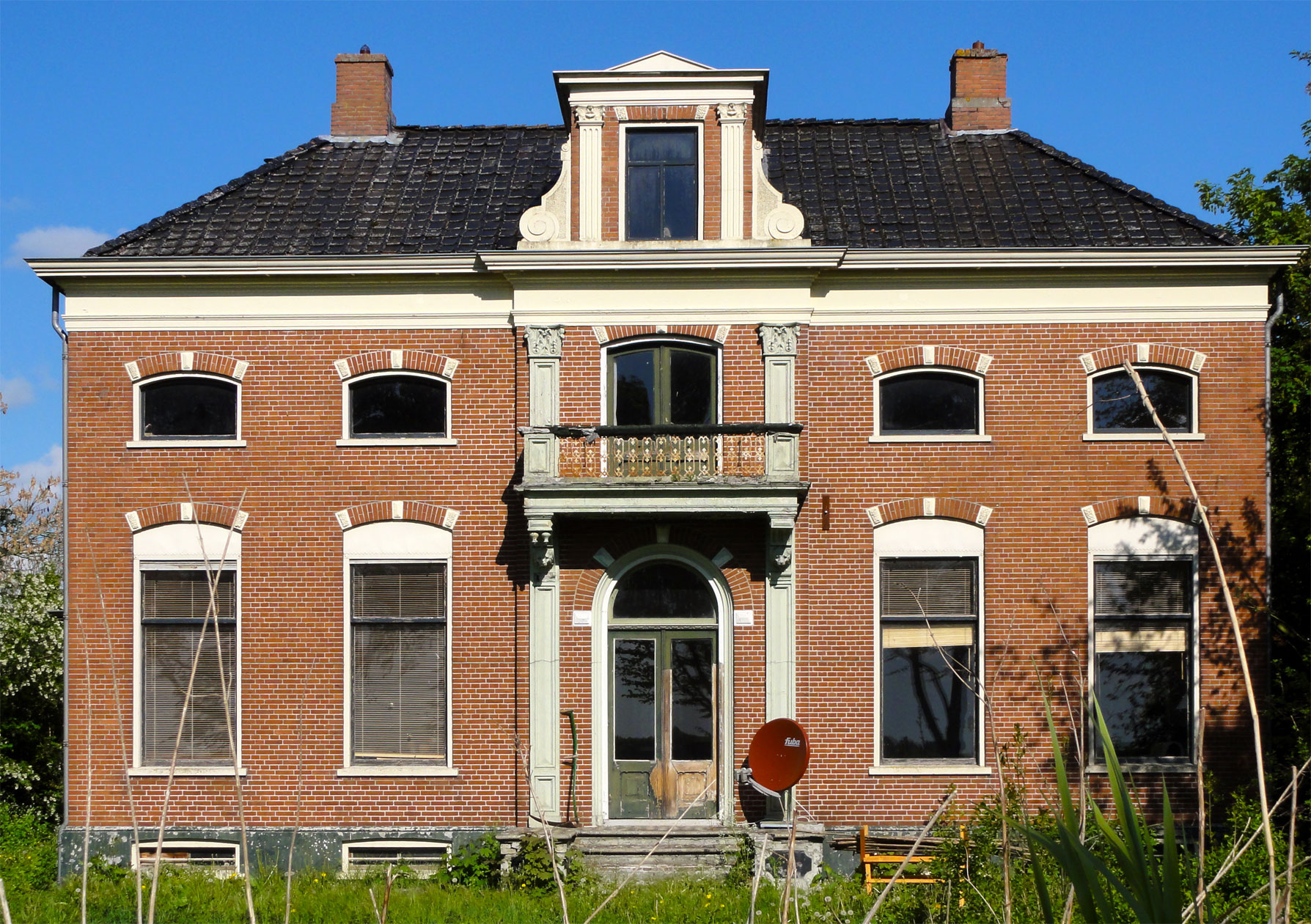
Farm in Nieuw-Beerta

== Climate ==
Climate data for Nieuw-Beerta (1991−2020 normals, extremes 1990−present)
Month	Jan	Feb	Mar	Apr	May	Jun	Jul	Aug	Sep	Oct	Nov	Dec	Year
Record high °C (°F)	13.6 (56.5)	17.9 (64.2)	23.6 (74.5)	28.6 (83.5)	31.3 (88.3)	33.8 (92.8)	37.9 (100.2)	35.6 (96.1)	31.4 (88.5)	27.6 (81.7)	19.5 (67.1)	14.1 (57.4)	37.9 (100.2)
Mean daily maximum °C (°F)	4.8 (40.6)	5.8 (42.4)	9.3 (48.7)	14.1 (57.4)	17.5 (63.5)	20.2 (68.4)	22.8 (73.0)	23.0 (73.4)	19.0 (66.2)	14.0 (57.2)	8.8 (47.8)	5.6 (42.1)	13.7 (56.7)
Daily mean °C (°F)	2.5 (36.5)	2.8 (37.0)	5.3 (41.5)	8.8 (47.8)	12.4 (54.3)	15.2 (59.4)	17.5 (63.5)	17.5 (63.5)	14.4 (57.9)	10.2 (50.4)	6.2 (43.2)	3.3 (37.9)	9.7 (49.5)
Mean daily minimum °C (°F)	0.0 (32.0)	−0.1 (31.8)	1.3 (34.3)	3.5 (38.3)	6.9 (44.4)	9.7 (49.5)	12.1 (53.8)	12.2 (54.0)	10.0 (50.0)	6.7 (44.1)	3.4 (38.1)	0.9 (33.6)	5.6 (42.1)
Record low °C (°F)	−18.9 (−2.0)	−18.2 (−0.8)	−19.3 (−2.7)	−6.6 (20.1)	−2.9 (26.8)	0.9 (33.6)	4.9 (40.8)	5.4 (41.7)	1.2 (34.2)	−6.1 (21.0)	−9.8 (14.4)	−17.0 (1.4)	−19.3 (−2.7)
Average precipitation mm (inches)	66.5 (2.62)	51.6 (2.03)	51.3 (2.02)	37.8 (1.49)	55.9 (2.20)	63.3 (2.49)	84.3 (3.32)	75.1 (2.96)	76.4 (3.01)	66.2 (2.61)	65.1 (2.56)	72.5 (2.85)	766.0 (30.16)
Average relative humidity (%)	90.2	88.0	84.0	78.8	79.0	81.2	81.1	80.1	84.1	87.7	91.4	91.6	84.8
Mean monthly sunshine hours	60.9	89.0	142.2	196.7	227.0	208.1	217.8	197.0	155.6	118.8	64.3	56.7	1,734.1
Percentage possible sunshine	24.0	31.9	38.6	46.9	46.3	41.1	42.9	43.0	40.7	36.0	24.5	23.9	36.6
Source: Royal Netherlands Meteorological Institute
