= Humanitas (disambiguation) =

Humanitas may refer to:

- The word humanitas, created by Cicero to describe a good human
- Humanitas (publishing house), a Romanian publishing house
- Humanitas (journal)
- Humanitas Prize, an award given to motion pictures and television shows
- Humanitas University, a private medical school in Rozzano (Milan), Italy
- HUMANITAS (Grand Lodge), a German grand lodge in the Liberal Masonic tradition
- The Humanitas Programme, a series of Visiting Professorships at the Universities of Oxford and Cambridge
