= Peter den Oudsten =

Dutch politician

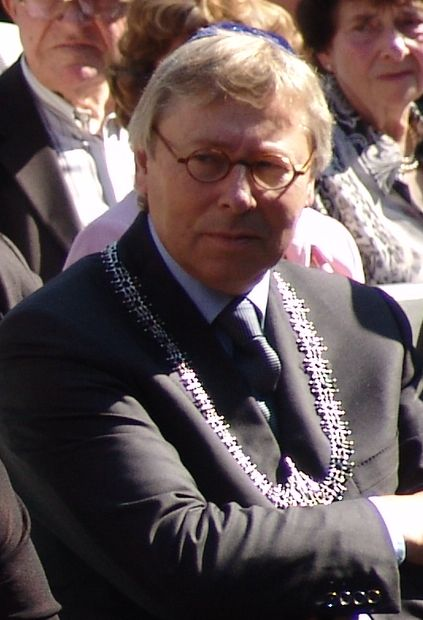
- Den Oudsten in 2008

Acting Mayor of Utrecht
- In office 1 July 2020 – December 2020
- Preceded by: Jan van Zanen
- Succeeded by: Sharon Dijksma

Personal details
- Born: 24 October 1951 (age 74) Leeuwarden, Netherlands
- Party: Labour Party

Peter den Oudsten (born 1951) is a Dutch politician of the Labour Party (PvdA).

He was acting mayor of Utrecht in 2020. Previously, he was mayor of Leeuwarden (acting), Meppel, Enschede, and Groningen.

== Career ==
Den Oudsten began his career in 1975 as a civil servant in the municipality of Enschede. In 1984 he became a member and spokesperson for Provincial Energy Friesland. In 1991 he worked at Friesland Foods and became head of corporate communications.

From 1986 to 1997, Den Oudsten was a member of the municipal council of Leeuwarden. Successively he was an alderman from 1997 to 2001. Afterwards he was mayor of Meppel from 2001 to 2005, and mayor of Enschede from 2005 to 2014. In January 2015, he was appointed mayor of Groningen.
