= Reiderland =

- Former Municipality
- Flag Coat of arms

- Coordinates: 53°10′N 7°05′E
- Country: Netherlands
- Province: Groningen

Area (2006)
  - Total: 156.72 km^{2} (60.51 sq mi)
  - Land: 98.55 km^{2} (38.05 sq mi)
  - Water: 58.16 km^{2} (22.46 sq mi)

Population (1 January, 2007)
  - Total: 7,004
  - Density: 71/km^{2} (180/sq mi)
- Source: CBS, Statline.
- Time zone: UTC+1 (CET)
  - Summer (DST): UTC+2 (CEST)

Reiderland (Dutch pronunciation: [ˌrɛidərˈlɑnt]) is a former municipality in the province Groningen in the northeastern Netherlands, which was founded in 1990 during a large municipal reorganisation. The former municipalities Finsterwolde and Bad Nieuweschans were abolished and added to Beerta. In 1992, the new municipality was given its current name. In 2010 it joined in the municipality Oldambt.

== Politics ==
Reiderland was one of the few municipalities in the Netherlands that still had communist councillors after the dissolution of the Communist Party of the Netherlands in 1989. (As of 2006, it was one of only four Dutch municipalities to have any, the other three being Heiloo, Scheemda and Lemsterland.) The New Communist Party–NCPN was in fact the largest party in Reiderland from 1990 to 1998 and again from 2002 to 2006. Finsterwolde and Beerta, which was the only town in the Netherlands that ever had a communist mayor, had long been communist strongholds.

In the 1998 municipal election, the NCPN received 35.7% of the votes, behind the Labour Party's 40.3%, but in 2002 it received 34.1%, ahead of the Labour Party's 24.7%. It won five of the thirteen seats on the local council and formed the Court of Mayor and the Aldermen in alliance with local party Gemeentebelangen, although the two parties were traditionally foes. In the 2006 election, however, the NCPN lost 3 of its 5 seats, getting only 18.3% of the vote, behind the Labour Party's 38.1%, Gemeentebelangen's 20.4%, and the Socialist Party's 19.0%, and consequently lost its positions on the Court of Mayor and Aldermen. For the remaining years of the municipality's existence, the Labour Party's had 5 seats on the local council, the Socialist Party 3 seats, local party Gemeentebelangen 3 seats as well, and the NCPN 2 seats.

Reiderland also drew some attention in the 2002 general election, when the Pim Fortuyn List received 22.9% of the vote in the municipality, the party's best result in the province of Groningen.

== Population centres ==
Towns and villages in the municipality include:

- Beersterhoogen
- Beerta
- Booneschans
- Drieborg
- Ekamp
- Finsterwolde
- Finsterwolderhamrik
- Ganzedijk
- Goldhoorn
- Hamdijk
- Hongerige Wolf
- Kostverloren
- Kromme-Elleboog
- Nieuw-Beerta
- Nieuwe Statenzijl
- Bad Nieuweschans
- Oude Statenzijl
- Oudedijk
- Oudezijl
- Ulsda

== The old Reiderland ==
Reiderland is also the name of an area of land in the Netherlands and Germany that was drowned with 33 villages and a town in 1277 when the Dollart inlet formed. Much of the area has been re-empoldered since. See List of settlements lost to floods in the Netherlands#Drowned villages in Groningen province.
