= Felix Rottenberg =

Dutch politician

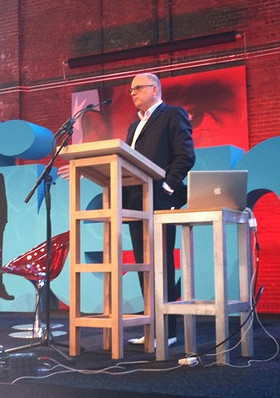
Felix Rottenberg in 2009

Felix Rottenberg (born 4 June 1957, in Amsterdam) is a Dutch politician and former chair of the Labour Party.
