= Rick van der Ploeg =

Dutch politician

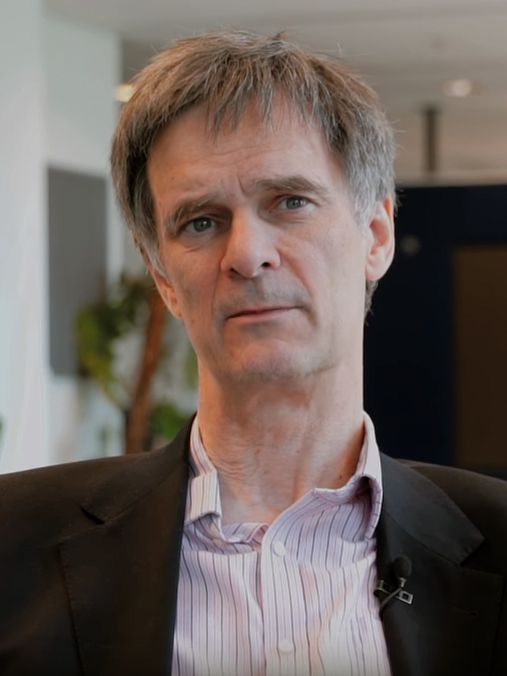
Rick van der Ploeg (2016)

Frederick "Rick" van der Ploeg (born 28 April 1956, in Rotterdam) is an Anglo-Dutch economist and former politician.

== Career ==
After having obtained his PhD at the University of Cambridge, he held professorships in economics at the University of Amsterdam, Tilburg University, and the London School of Economics. After having served as an MP for the Dutch Labour Party (PvdA) from 1994 until 1998, he became State Secretary for Culture and Media in the government of Prime Minister Wim Kok from 1998 until 2002.

Van der Ploeg is currently a professor of economics at the University of Oxford and the VU University Amsterdam, and the research director at the Oxford Centre for the Analysis of Resource Rich Economies. In 2010 he became a correspondent of the Royal Netherlands Academy of Arts and Sciences.

Van der Ploeg's studies the potential impact of climate change on the economy. To meet proposed carbon emissions reductions, and prevent temperature increases beyond 2 degrees, up to one-third of global oil reserves, half of gas reserves and 80 percent of coal reserves will have to remain unburned, making them stranded assets. This will affect oil, gas, and coal companies, and "carbon-intensive industries such as steel, aluminum, cement, plastics, and greenhouse horticulture". Van der Ploeg emphasizes the need for investors to be aware of climate-related financial risk and take them into account for long-term planning.

== Other activities ==
- Max Planck Institute for Tax Law and Public Finance, member of the board of trustees

== Personal life ==
Van der Ploeg has Dutch nationality. His father is Dutch, his mother is British. He is married and has a son called Boris.
