= Beerta =

- Village
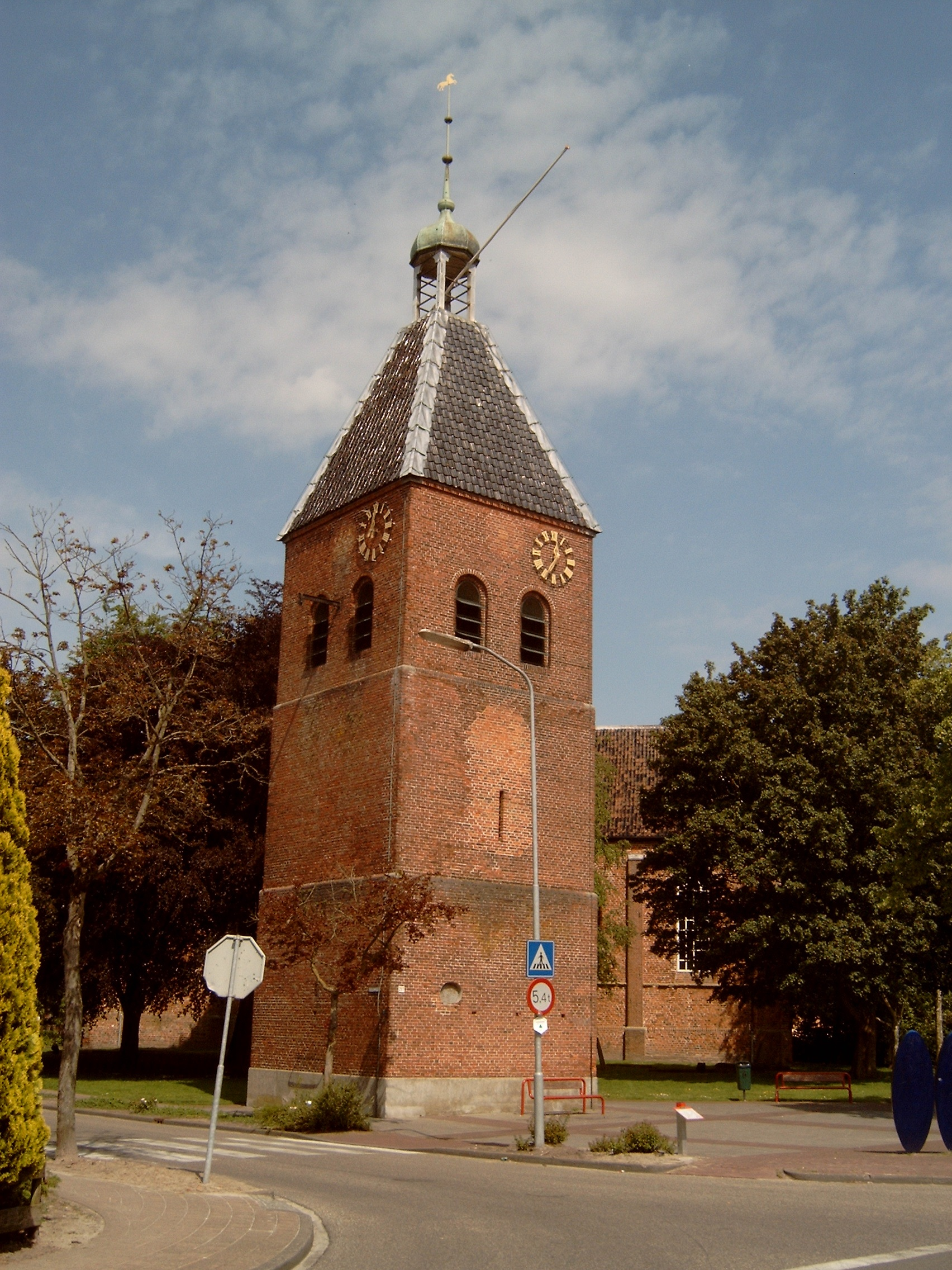
- The church tower in 2007

- Location of Beerta in Groningen in the Netherlands Beerta (Netherlands)
- Coordinates: 53°10′26″N 7°5′42″E
- Country: Netherlands
- Province: Groningen
- Municipality: Oldambt

Area
  - Total: 36.33 km^{2} (14.03 sq mi)
- Elevation: 2 m (6.6 ft)

Population (2021)
  - Total: 2,205
  - Density: 60.69/km^{2} (157.2/sq mi)
- Postal code: 9686
- Area code: 0597

Beerta (Dutch pronunciation: [ˈbeːrtaː]; Gronings: (De) Beert(e) [də ˈbɪːdə]) is a village and former municipality with a population of 2,205 in the municipality of Oldambt in the province of Groningen in the Netherlands. In the 20th century, Beerta was a communist stronghold. In 1933, the municipal council was dismissed by the government, and was ruled by a government commissioner until 1935. Between 1982 and 1990, Beerta was the only municipality with a communist mayor.

== Etymology ==
Beerta means "place with houses" (English: neighboorhood; Frisian: buorren) The name was sometimes explained as relating to the 12th century monastery Barthe which was lost in a flood, however the monastery has been excavated in Hesel, East Frisia, Germany, in 1988.

== History ==
The Dollart is a bay in the Wadden Sea which was gradually expanding in size. Around 1600, it peaked at around 250 square kilometres (97 sq mi). Beerta was located on higher ground, and became a peninsula in the bay. The village dates from the 11th century.

The expanding Dollart implied that parts of Beerta were moved to higher ground. The Saint Bartholomew Church dates from between 1506 and 1508, and was partially constructed using material of a 1462 church. The poldering of the Dollart resulted in a large areas of cultivated land, and in the mid-19th century, Beerta became a prosperous village with an elite of rich farmers. In 1840, it was home to 3,189 people.

The disparity in wealth resulted in the emergence of communists. In 1919, the first communists were elected to the municipal council.

Beerta was a separate municipality until 1990, when it merged with Finsterwolde and Nieuweschans to form a new municipality that was initially also called Beerta, but was renamed Reiderland one year later. In 2010, Reiderland merged into the new municipality of Oldambt.

== Communism ==
In 1919, the first communists were elected to the municipal council. Beerta became a Communist Party of the Netherlands (CPN) stronghold, and in 1933, it became the largest party. In December 1933, the States General of the Netherlands dissolved the municipal council claiming an ungovernable situation, and appointed a government commissioner to rule the municipality. The CPN won again in the 1935 election, however the Social Democratic Workers' Party defected and formed a majority coalition with the other parties. Beerta would continue to be ruled by a coalition which excluded the CPN until 1966 when the communist party won the elections with an absolute majority.

In 1982, Hanneke Jagersma of the CPN became the mayor of Beerta. She was the first and only communist mayor in the Netherlands. In 1989, the CPN abandoned its Marxist–Leninist roots and merged into GroenLinks, however Jagersma did not join the new party. In 1990, Beerta was merged into Reiderland and Jagersma was no longer mayor.

== Geography ==
Beerta is situated in the municipality of Oldambt and the (historical) region of Oldambt in the east of the province of Groningen in the northeast of the Netherlands.

To the southwest of Beerta is Winschoten, to the west is Blauwestad, to the north is Finsterwolde, to the east is Bad Nieuweschans, to the southeast is Bellingwolde, and to the south is Blijham. North of Beerta is the Dollart, which is part of the Wadden Sea, to the west is the Oldambtmeer, and to the southeast are the rivers Westerwoldse Aa and Pekel Aa.

The former municipality of Beerta included the settlements Drieborg, Nieuw-Beerta, Nieuwe Statenzijl, Oudezijl, Oude Statenzijl, Ulsda, and Winschoterzijl.

== Notable people ==
- Hans Hateboer (born 1994), footballer
- Jurrie Koolhof (1960–2019), football striker and manager
- Harry Powers (1893–1932), American serial killer
- Marcus Slingenberg (1881–1941), politician and former minister of Social Affairs

== Gallery ==
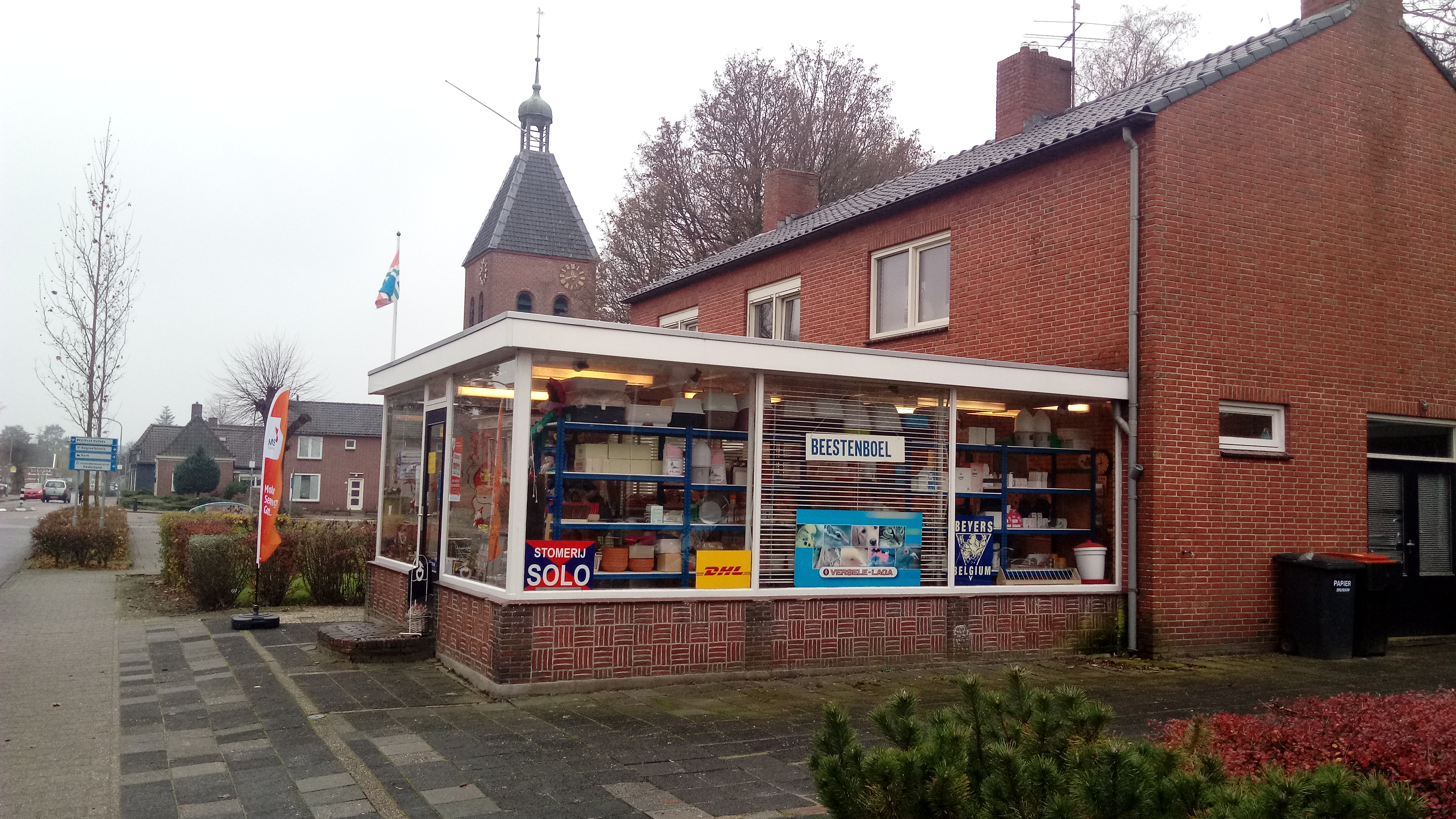
Residential house with a pet shop

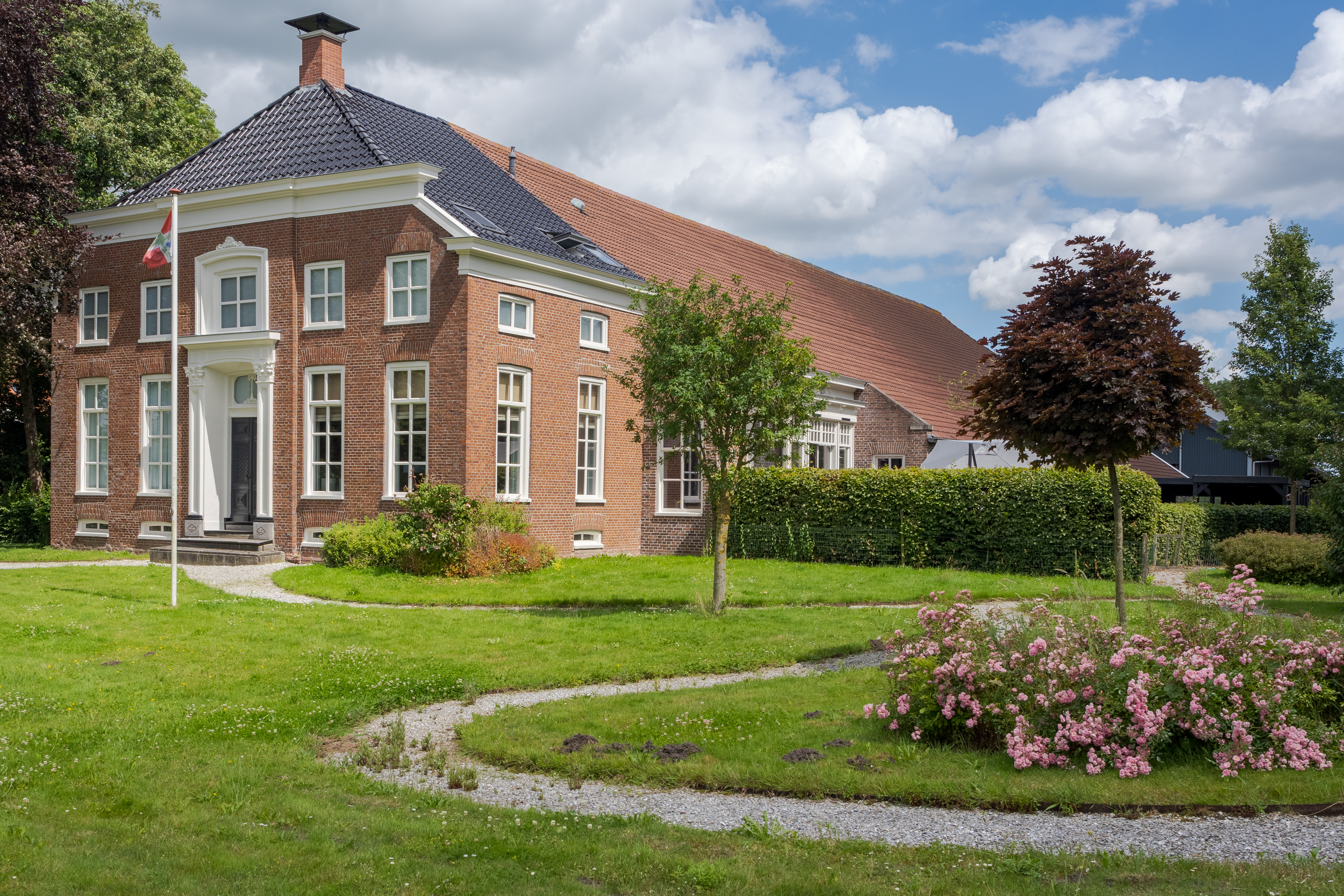
Farm in Beerta

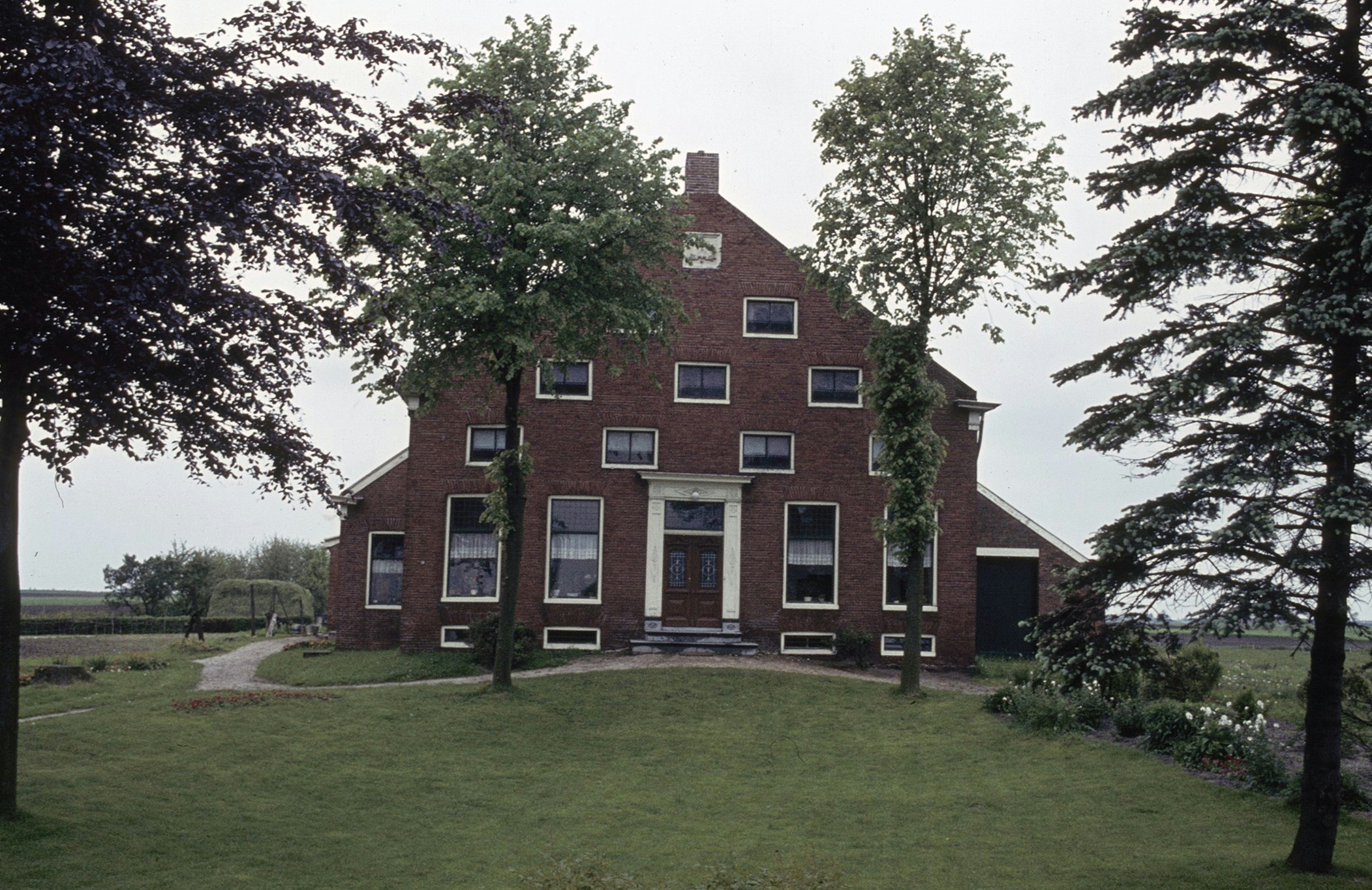
Farm

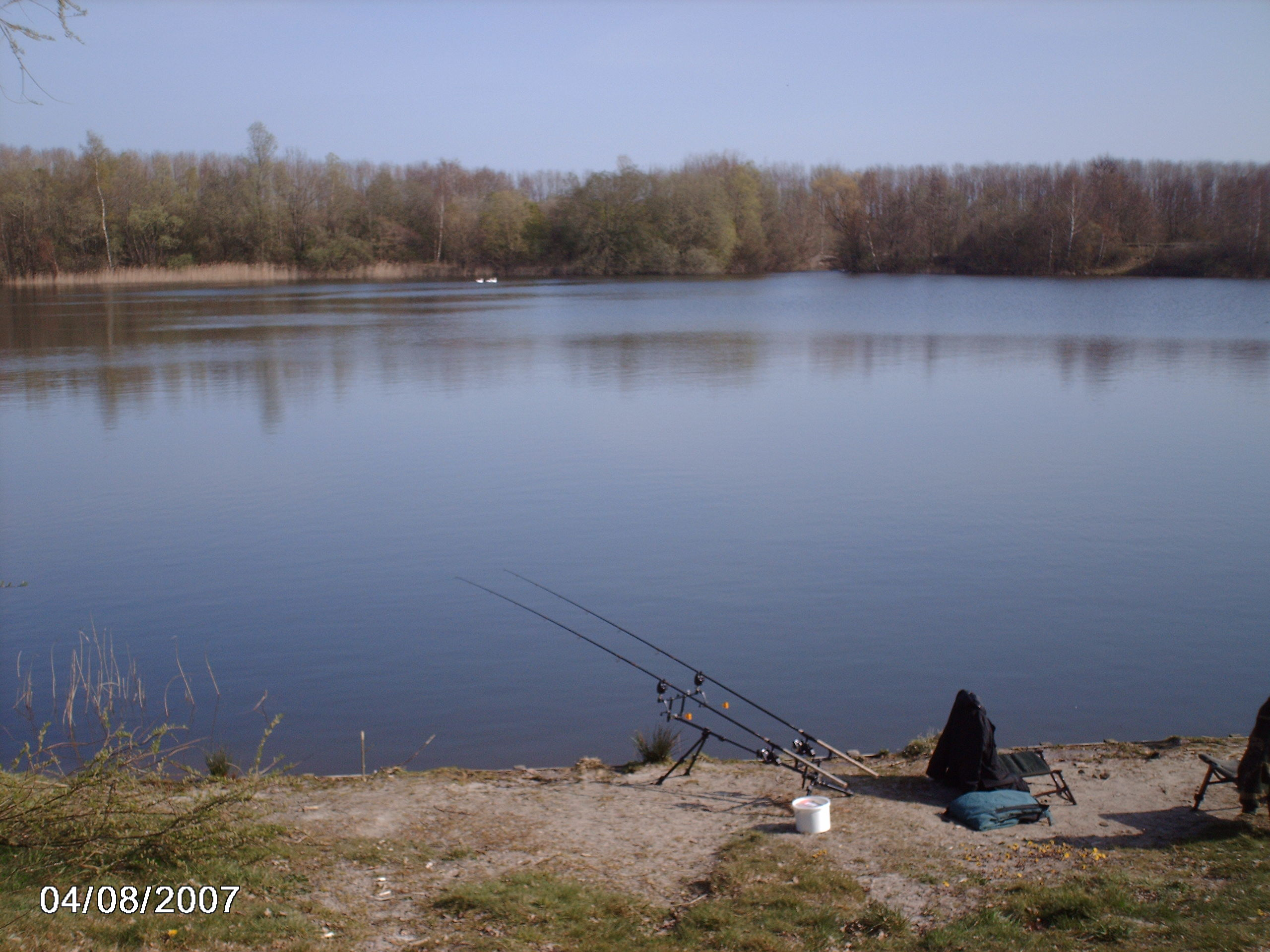
Beersterplas

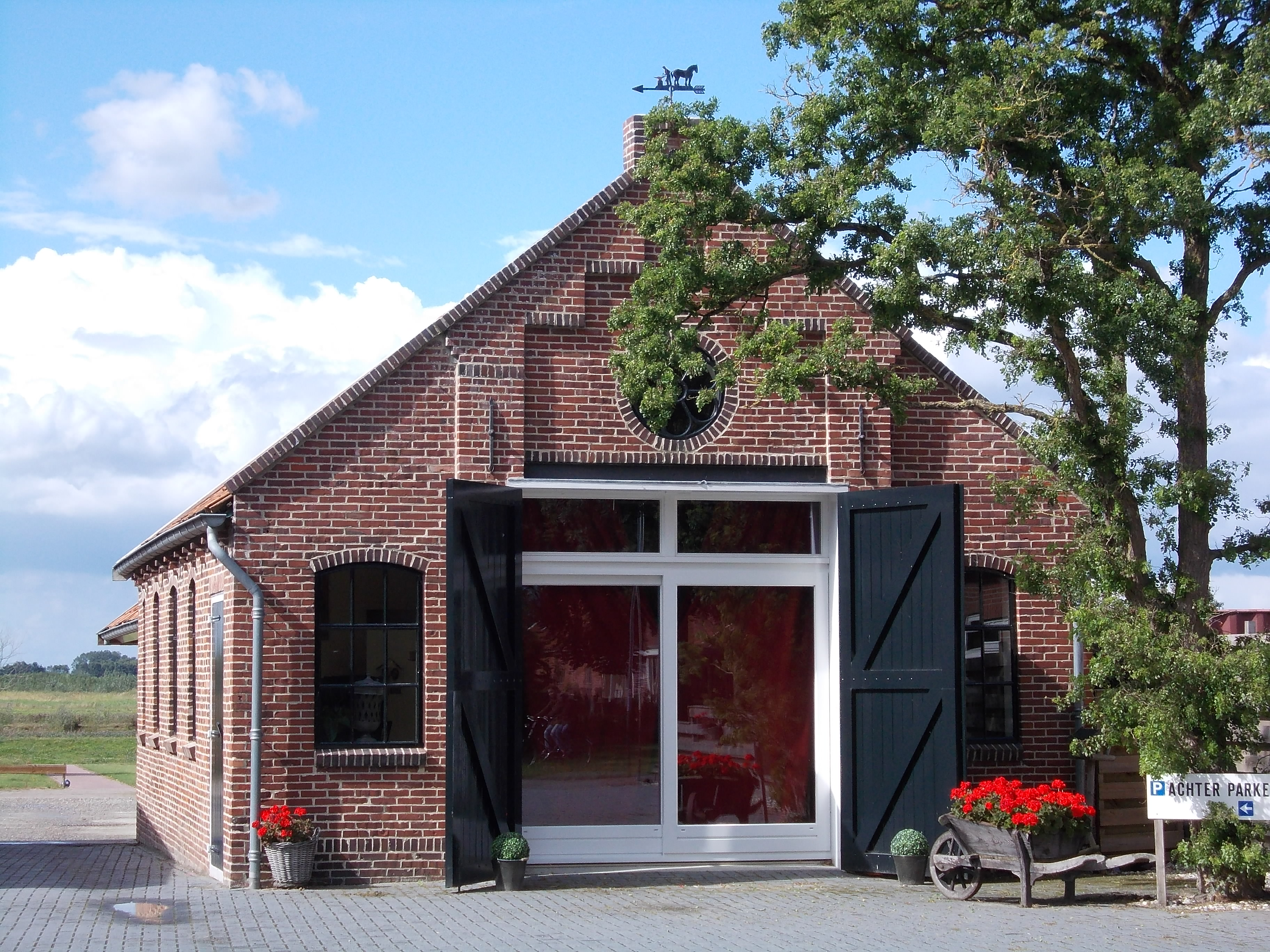
Carriage house
