= Scheemda railway station =

Railway station in Scheemda, Netherlands

Scheemda
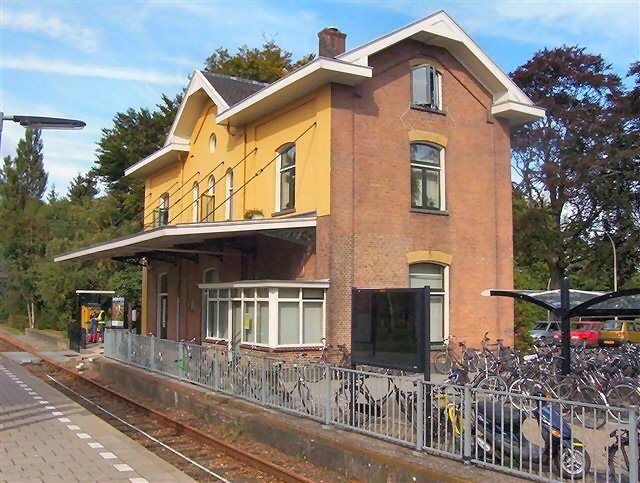
- Scheemda railway station in 2005

General information
- Location: Stationsstraat 85; Scheemda, Netherlands
- Coordinates: 53°09′55″N 6°58′40″E
- Operator: NS Stations
- Line: Harlingen–Nieuweschans railway
- Platforms: 2 (island platform)
- Tracks: 2
- Train operators: Arriva
- Bus operators: Qbuzz
- Connections: Bus lines 17, 48, 119, 643

Construction
- Architect: Karel Hendrik van Brederode

Other information
- Station code: Sda

History
- Opened: 1 May 1868

Services
Preceding station	Arriva Netherlands	Following station
Zuidbroek towards Groningen	Stoptrein 20100	Winschoten towards Leer
Zuidbroek towards Groningen	Stoptrein 37500	Winschoten towards Bad Nieuweschans
Location
- Location within Netherlands

Scheemda (Dutch pronunciation: [ˈsxeːmdaː]; abbreviation: Sda) is an unstaffed railway station in Scheemda in the Netherlands. It is located on the Harlingen–Nieuweschans railway between Zuidbroek and Winschoten in the province of Groningen.

The station building was designed by Karel Hendrik van Brederode and completed in 1865. The train services started on 1 May 1868. Trains have been operated by Staatsspoorwegen (1868–1937), Nederlandse Spoorwegen (1938–2000), NoordNed (2000–2005), and Arriva (2005–present).

There are two tracks and an island platform at the station. Two local train services with trains in both directions call at Scheemda twice per hour. There are also connections to four regional bus services provided by Qbuzz.

== Location ==
The railway station is located at the Stationsstraat in the village of Scheemda, part of the municipality of Oldambt, in the east of the province of Groningen in the northeast of the Netherlands. It is situated on the Harlingen–Nieuweschans railway, also called Staatslijn B, between the railway stations of Zuidbroek and Winschoten. The Heiligerlee railway stop was situated between Scheemda and Winschoten from 1908 to 1934. The distance from Scheemda westward to railway terminus Harlingen Haven is 110 km (68 mi), to Groningen 29 km (18 mi), and to Zuidbroek 7.6 km (4.7 mi), and eastward to Winschoten is 4.9 km (3.0 mi), and to Bad Nieuweschans 17 km (11 mi).

== History ==
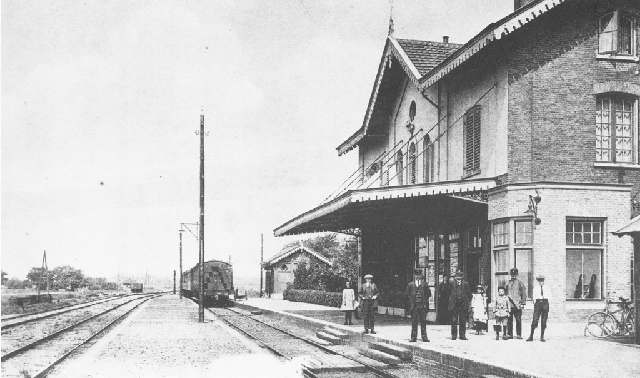
The railway station in 1925

The station building was completed in 1865. The station was opened on 1 May 1868, when train services started on the segment of the Harlingen–Nieuweschans railway between Groningen and Winschoten. At the time, the station was named Scheemda-Eexta.

Trains were operated by Maatschappij tot Exploitatie van Staatsspoorwegen (1868–1937), Nederlandse Spoorwegen (1938–2000), NoordNed (2000–2005), and Arriva (2005–present).

== Building and layout ==
The 19th-century station building is of the type SS 4th class, which was probably designed by architect Karel Hendrik van Brederode. (Note: Van Brederode was leading the railway's building department and as such responsible for the station buildings, but there is no source confirming that he was the designer in person.) Fifteen buildings of this type were built in the Netherlands between 1862 and 1890, of which seven remain today. The building has been a national heritage site (Dutch: rijksmonument) since 2001.

The railway through Scheemda is unelectrified and oriented northwest to southeast. At the station, the single-track railway splits into two tracks. There is an island with two platforms that can be accessed via a level crossing. Platform 1 alongside the northern track is serving trains to Groningen and platform 2 alongside the southern track is serving trains to Winschoten. The station building is north of both tracks. Beyond the station, the tracks merge back into a single track.

== Train services ==
Route	Service type	Operator	Notes
Groningen - Hoogezand-Sappemeer - Zuidbroek - Winschoten - Bad Nieuweschans - Leer (Germany)	Local ("Stoptrein")	Arriva	1x per hour
Groningen - Hoogezand-Sappemeer - Zuidbroek - Winschoten (- Bad Nieuweschans)	Local ("Stoptrein")	Arriva	1x per hour - 1x per 2 hours on Sundays. During morning rush hour and on evenings, a couple of runs run through to Bad Nieuweschans.

== Bus services ==
Line	Route	Operator	Notes
17	Winschoten - Beerta - Finsterwolde - Oostwold - Midwolda - Scheemda	Qbuzz and Taxi De Grooth	No evening and Sunday service.
119	Delfzijl - Wagenborgen - Nieuwolda - Scheemda - Heiligerlee - Winschoten	Qbuzz	
643	Winschoten - Heiligerlee - Scheemda - Nieuw-Scheemda - 't Waar - Nieuwolda - Woldendorp	Qbuzz	Only 1 run during both rush hours.
