= Heiligerlee =

- Village
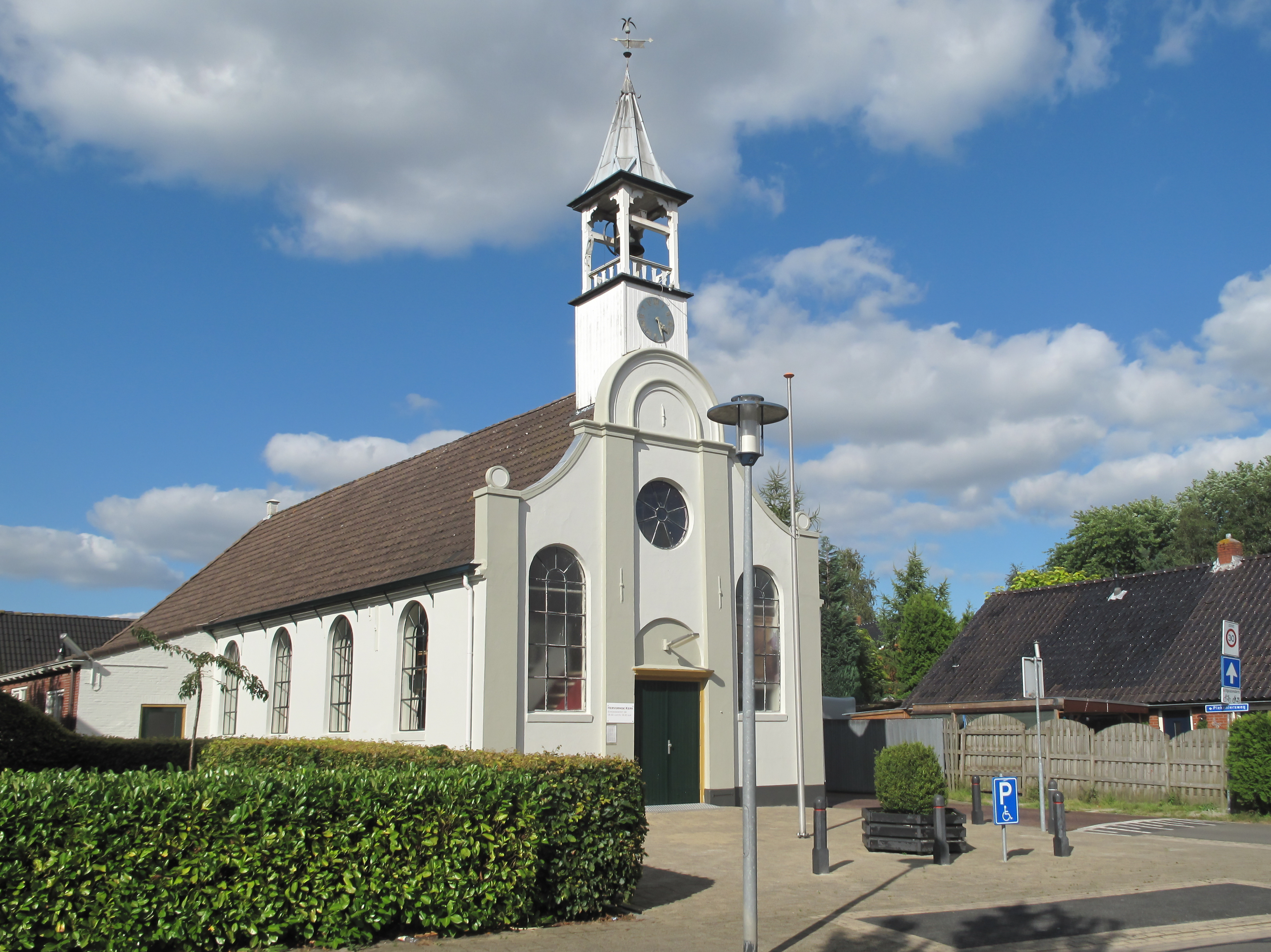
- Church in Heiligerlee in 2012

- Location in the province of Groningen in the Netherlands Heiligerlee (Netherlands)
- Coordinates: 53°09′18″N 07°00′45″E
- Country: Netherlands
- Province: Groningen
- Municipality: Oldambt

Area
  - Total: 2.34 km^{2} (0.90 sq mi)
- Elevation: 1.9 m (6.2 ft)

Population (2021)
  - Total: 1,350
  - Density: 577/km^{2} (1,490/sq mi)
- Time zone: UTC+1 (CET)
  - Summer (DST): UTC+2 (CEST)
- Postal code: 9677
- Dialing code: 0597

Heiligerlee (Dutch: [ˌɦɛiləɣərˈleː]; Gronings: Kloosterholt [ˈkloʊstərɦɔːɫt]) is a village in the Dutch province of Groningen bordering the town of Winschoten, it is part of the municipality of Oldambt. It was the site of the 1536 Battle and the 1568 Battle of Heiligerlee

== History ==
From the year 1230 till the year 1594 a Norbertine nunnery (Mons Sinaï) stood in the village, the name of which is currently used as the name of the village Christian primary school.

The 1536 Battle of Heiligerlee was part of the Guelders Wars. The Danish allies of Guelders were defeated by Habsburg forces.

The 1568 Battle of Heiligerlee was the first battle that the Dutch rebels won against the Spanish. The army led by Louis and Adolf of Nassau defeated the Spanish, but politically it was no success. Adolf even died during the fight. It was the first battle of importance fought in the Eighty Years' War, and therefore often marked as its beginning.

On the 300th anniversary of the battle in 1868 the then ruling king William III of the Netherlands revealed a monument in commemoration of the battle.

From 1908 to 1934, the Heiligerlee railway stop on the Harlingen-Nieuweschans railway was located in the village.

== Notable people ==
- Tjapko van Bergen (1903–1944), rower

== Gallery ==
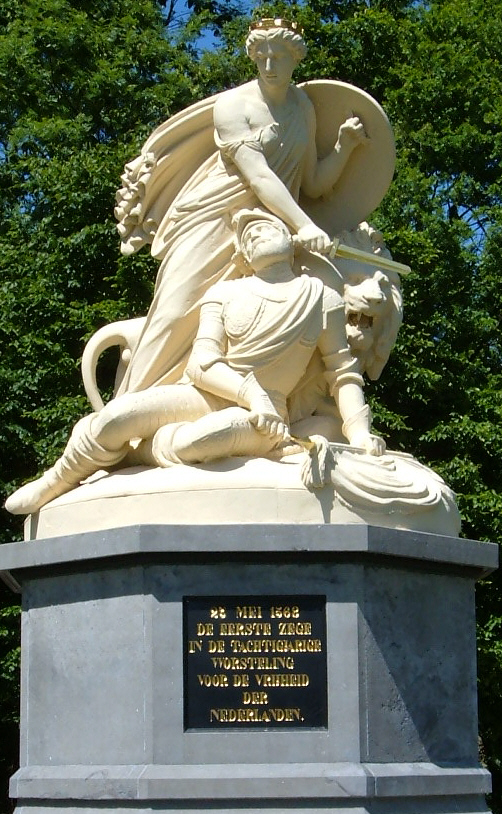
Battle of Heiligerlee monument

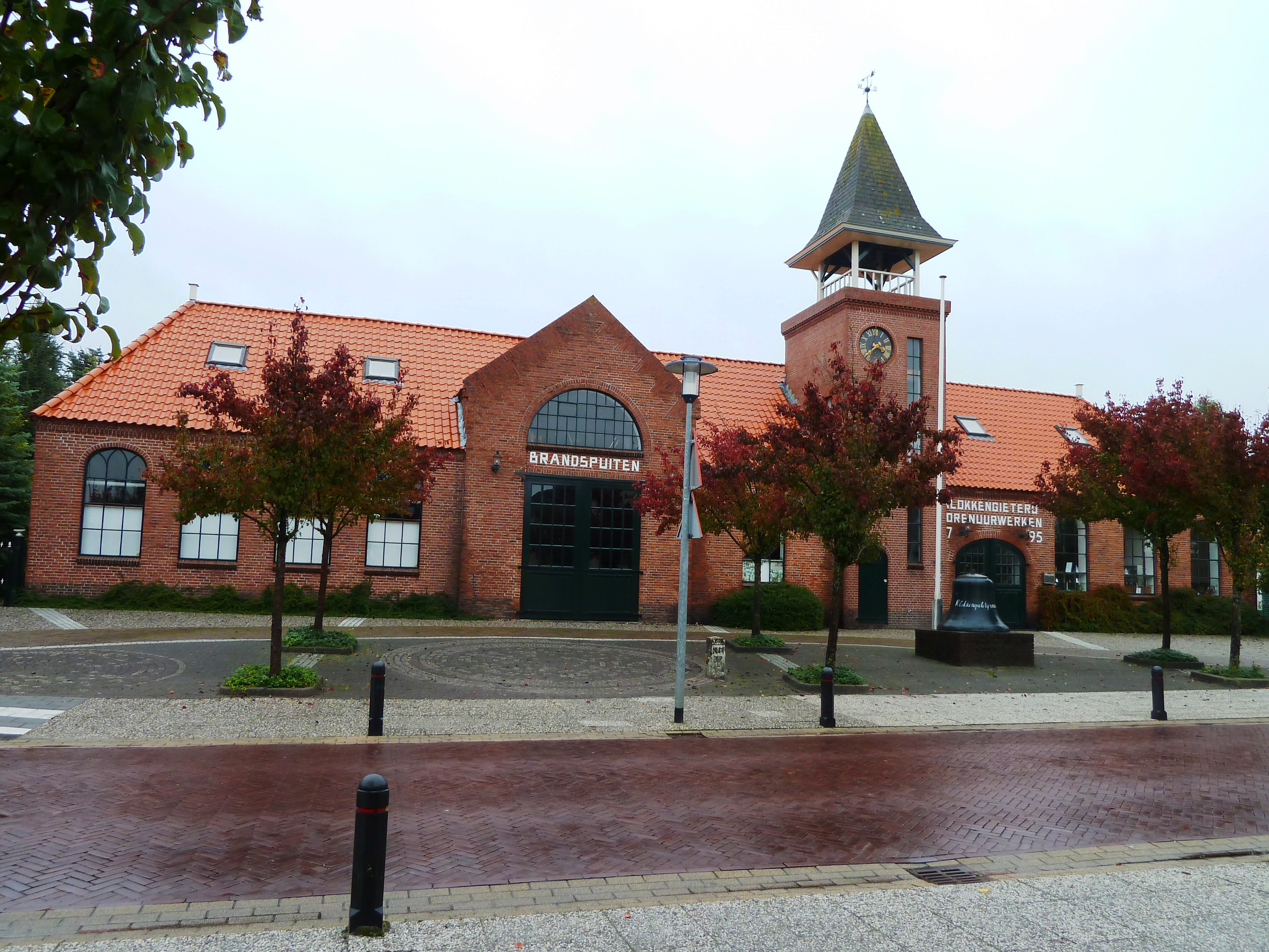
Bell museum

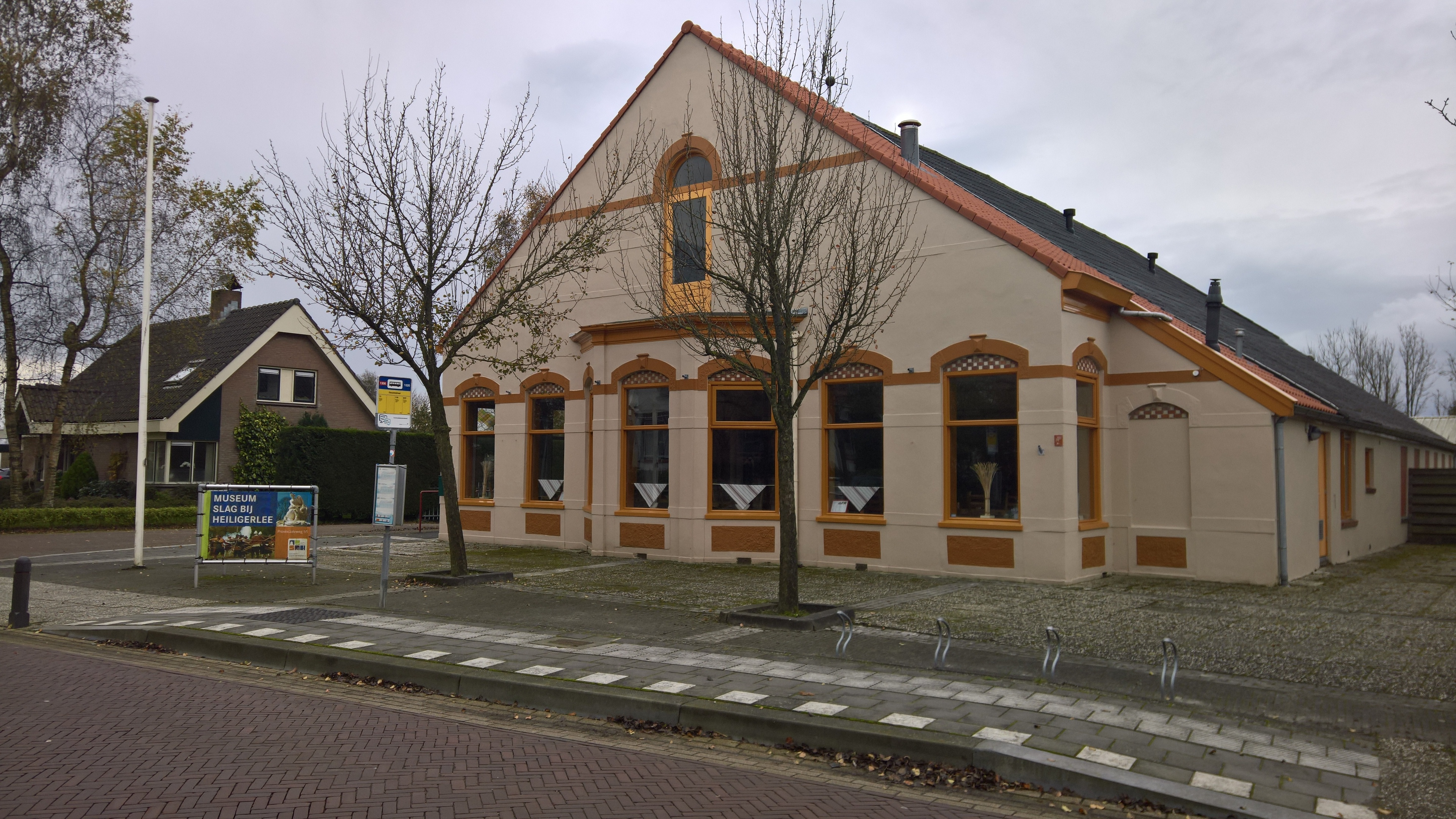
Battle of Heiligerlee museum

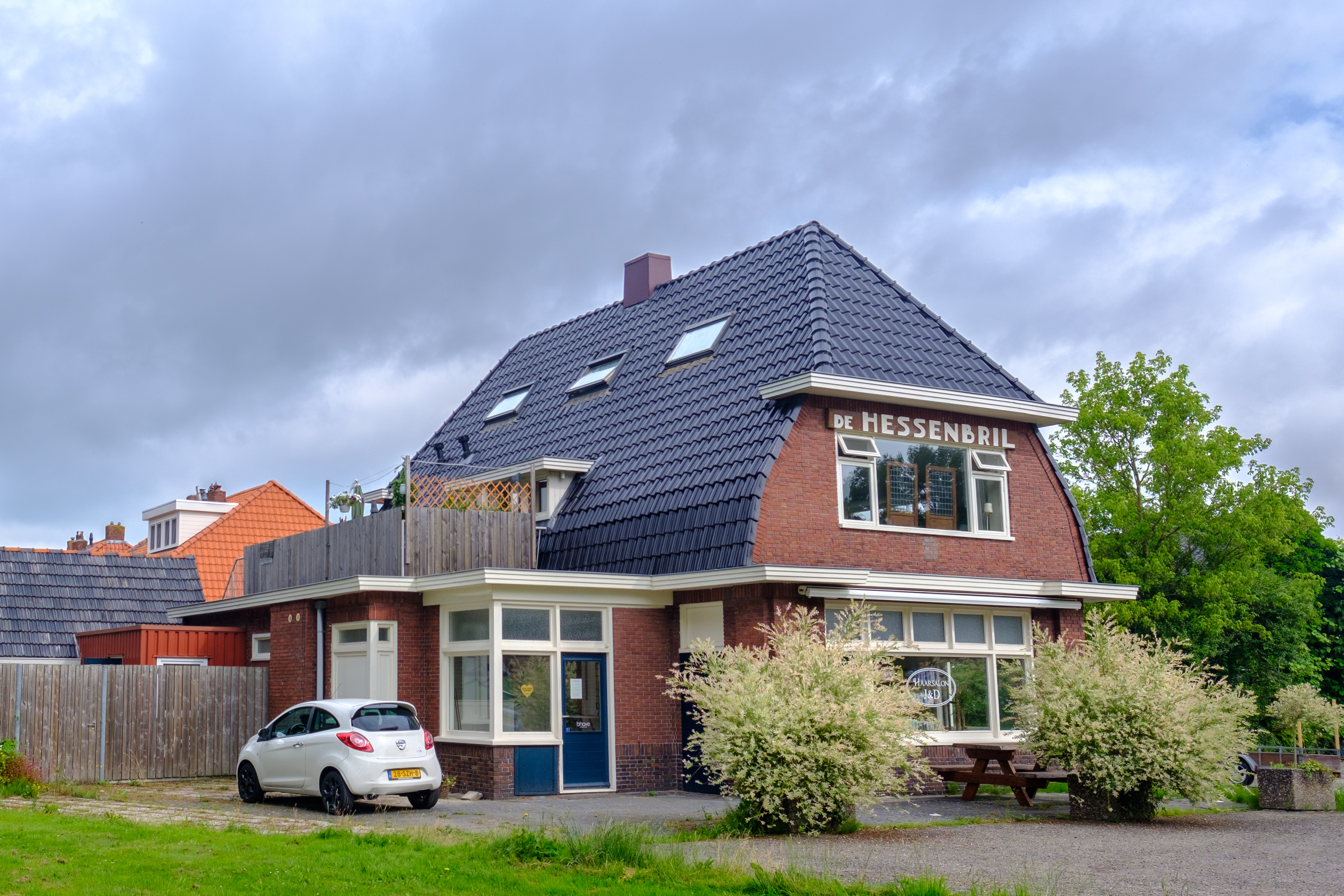
House De Hessenbril
