= Winschoten railway station =

Railway station in the Dutch village of Winschoten

Winschoten
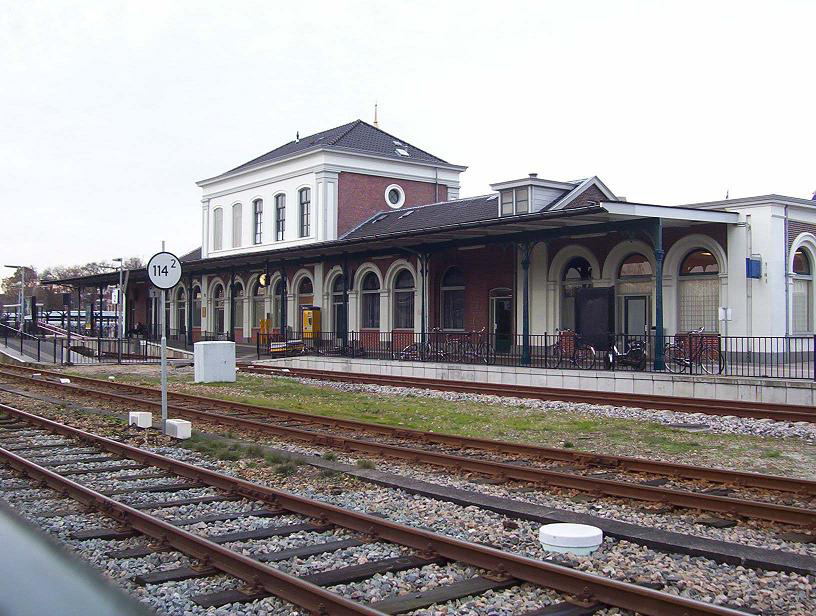
- Winschoten railway station in 2006

General information
- Location: Stationsweg 22; Winschoten, Netherlands
- Coordinates: 53°08′21″N 7°02′01″E
- Operator: NS Stations
- Line: Harlingen–Nieuweschans railway
- Platforms: 2
- Tracks: 3
- Train operators: Arriva
- Bus operators: Qbuzz
- Connections: Bus lines 12, 13, 14, 17, 23, 24, 119, 618, 643

Construction
- Architect: Karel Hendrik van Brederode

Other information
- Station code: Ws

History
- Opened: 1 May 1868

Services
Preceding station	Arriva Netherlands	Following station
Scheemda towards Groningen	Stoptrein 20100	Bad Nieuweschans towards Leer
Scheemda towards Groningen	Stoptrein 37500	Bad Nieuweschans Terminus
Location
- Location within Netherlands

Winschoten (Dutch pronunciation: [ˈʋɪnsxoːtə(n)]; abbreviation: Ws) is an unstaffed railway station in Winschoten in the Netherlands. It is located on the Harlingen–Nieuweschans railway between Scheemda and Bad Nieuweschans in the province of Groningen.

The station building, designed by Karel Hendrik van Brederode, was completed in 1865 and expanded in 1904. Train services started on 1 May 1868 and have since been provided by Maatschappij tot Exploitatie van Staatsspoorwegen (1868–1937), Nederlandse Spoorwegen (1938–2000), NoordNed (2000–2005), and Arriva (2005–present). During World War II, 500 Jews were transported from the station via the Westerbork transit camp to Nazi concentration camps, where most of them were killed.

The station has three tracks and two platforms. As of 2014, there are two local train services with trains every half an hour to and from Groningen, and trains every hour to and from Bad Nieuweschans and Leer (Germany). The station handles 2,500 rail passengers on an average weekday. There is a park and ride area for cars and bicycles, and a bus station with nine regional services provided by Qbuzz.

== Location ==
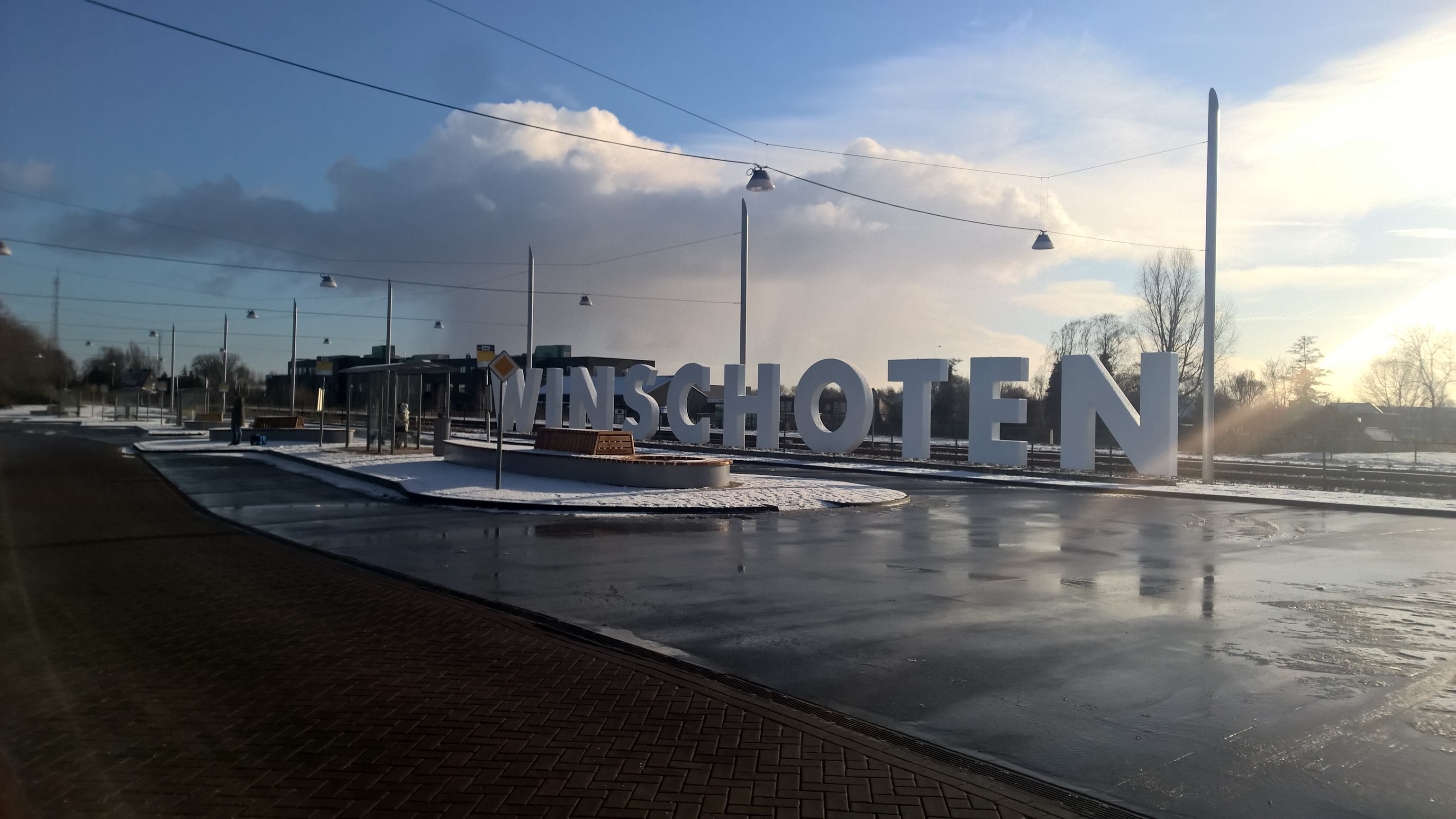
White letters spelling "Winschoten" at the bus area in 2017

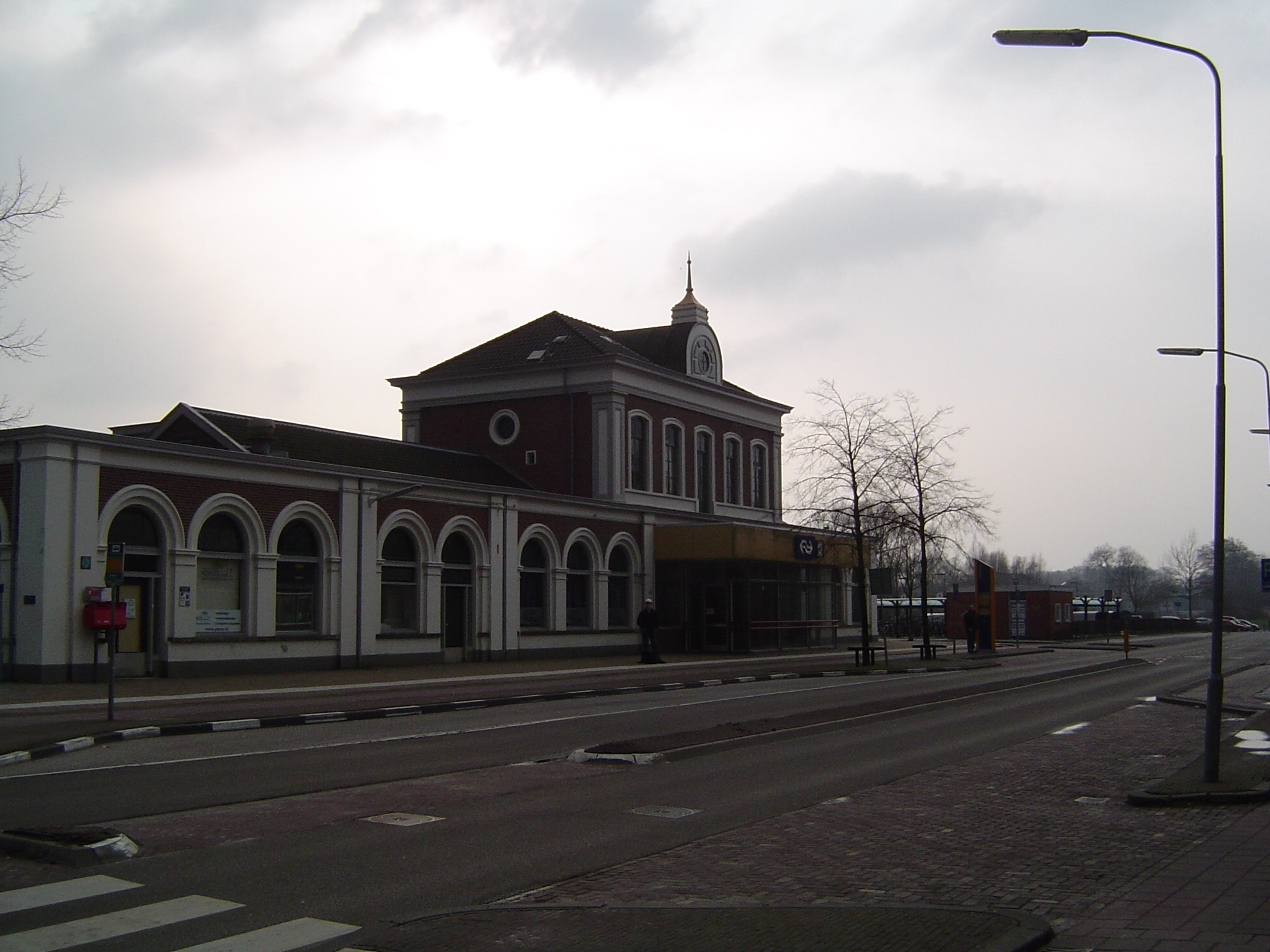
City-side facade of the station building in 2005

The railway station is located at the Stationsweg in the city of Winschoten, part of the municipality of Oldambt, in the east of the province of Groningen in the northeast of the Netherlands. It is situated on the Harlingen–Nieuweschans railway, also called Staatslijn B, between the railway stations of Scheemda in the west and Bad Nieuweschans in the east, both also in the municipality of Oldambt. The Heiligerlee railway stop was between Scheemda and Winschoten from 1908 to 1934, and the Ulsda railway stop was between Winschoten and Nieuweschans from 1887 to 1938. The railway connects via Zuidbroek and Groningen to the rest of the Dutch railway network in the west; and via Bad Nieuweschans to the German railway network in the east. The distance from Winschoten westward to railway terminus Harlingen Haven is 115 km (71 mi), to Groningen 34 km (21 mi), to Zuidbroek 12 km (7.5 mi), and to Scheemda 5 km (3.1 mi), and eastward to Bad Nieuweschans is 12 km (7.5 mi).

== History ==
In 1860, the Dutch government passed a law for the construction of ten state railways (Dutch: staatslijnen). The Harlingen–Nieuweschans railway or Staatslijn B was opened between 1863 and 1868. The first part between Harlingen Haven and Leeuwarden was opened in 1863 and the second part between Leeuwarden and Groningen in 1865.

The station building in Winschoten was completed in 1865. The third part of Staatslijn B between Groningen and Winschoten was opened on 1 May 1868. Trains were initially operated by the Maatschappij tot Exploitatie van Staatsspoorwegen (Company for the Exploitation of the State Railways). Services between Winschoten and Nieuweschans started in November 1868, and between Nieuweschans and Leer in Germany in December 1876, when the Harlingen–Nieuweschans railway was connected to the Ihrhove–Nieuweschans railway.

In 1904, the station building was expanded with a porch and additional waiting room. From 1938 to 2000, train services were provided by the Nederlandse Spoorwegen (Netherlands Railways), when the Maatschappij tot Exploitatie van Staatsspoorwegen merged with the Hollandsche IJzeren Spoorweg-Maatschappij (Hollandic Iron Railroad Company). In 1942, during the German occupation of the Netherlands in World War II, approximately 500 Jews from Winschoten were transported by train to the Westerbork transit camp and from there to Nazi concentration camps in Germany and Poland, where 446 of them were killed. As a result of the war, the German border at the railway was closed for passenger transport from 1944 to 1954. In 1967, the roofed bus station was built next to the station building. In the last quarter of the 20th century, the station building's porch was replaced.

From 1999 onwards, other railway companies received concessions for the northern railway lines of the Netherlands. NoordNed, a joint venture of the Nederlandse Spoorwegen and Arriva, provided the railway services to and from Winschoten between 2000 and 2005. The Ihrhove–Nieuweschans railway was closed for major renovations in the years 2000–2002. Arriva bought all shares of NoordNed in 2003, and rebranded the services as Arriva in 2005. In 2013–2015, the station building was restored to its state of 1904 as part of a larger project to improve the quality and functionality of the station area. Between December 2015 and October 2016, the Ihrhove–Nieuweschans railway was closed entirely after a railway bridge near Weener was destroyed in a collision with the ship Emsmoon. Until the bridge is replaced in 2021, Arriva is providing a rail replacement bus service between Weener and Leer. In 2016–2017, the roofed bus station was demolished and the bus area was modernized.

== Building and layout ==
The 19th-century station building is owned by NS Stations. It is of the type SS 3rd class, which was designed by Karel Hendrik van Brederode. SS 3rd class was chosen instead of the smaller SS 4th class because of the importance of Winschoten as a commercial center. Eight buildings of SS 3rd class were completed in the Netherlands between 1862 and 1865, of which four remain today. This building of 1865 has a median risalit and wings on both sides parallel to the railway. The facade on the city side and railway side are identical, except for a half round decoration on the city side. The doors and windows of the building have arched frames. In the 1904 expansion, an enclosed porch was added and the east wing was extended with an extra waiting room.

The railway through Winschoten is unelectrified and oriented west to east. At the station, the single-track railway splits into three tracks, with the station building on the north side. Platform 1 is on the northern side of the northern track, serving trains towards Groningen, and is partly covered by a roof attached to the station building. Platform 2, serving trains towards Bad Nieuweschans and Leer is on the northern side of the central track, and is accessed via a level crossing from platform 1. The platforms have shelters, wheelchair ramps, tactile paving and dynamic passenger information. The southern track has no platform and serves as a passing loop. Beyond the station the tracks merge back into a single track.

West of the station building is a free park and ride (Dutch: parkeer en reis) area with 120 car parking spaces and 320 bicycle stands at the station. There are also subscription-only bicycle lockers and a subscription-only bicycle rental service. There is a tunnel for cyclists and pedestrians underneath the tracks and platforms to the south side of the city. East of the station building is a bus station which is owned by Arriva. There is also a taxicab stand at the station.

== Train services ==
Route	Service type	Operator	Notes
Groningen - Hoogezand-Sappemeer - Zuidbroek - Winschoten - Bad Nieuweschans - Leer (Germany)	Local ("Stoptrein")	Arriva	1x per hour
Groningen - Hoogezand-Sappemeer - Zuidbroek - Winschoten (- Bad Nieuweschans)	Local ("Stoptrein")	Arriva	1x per hour - 1x per 2 hours on Sundays. During morning rush hour and on evenings, a couple of runs run through to Bad Nieuweschans.

== Bus services ==
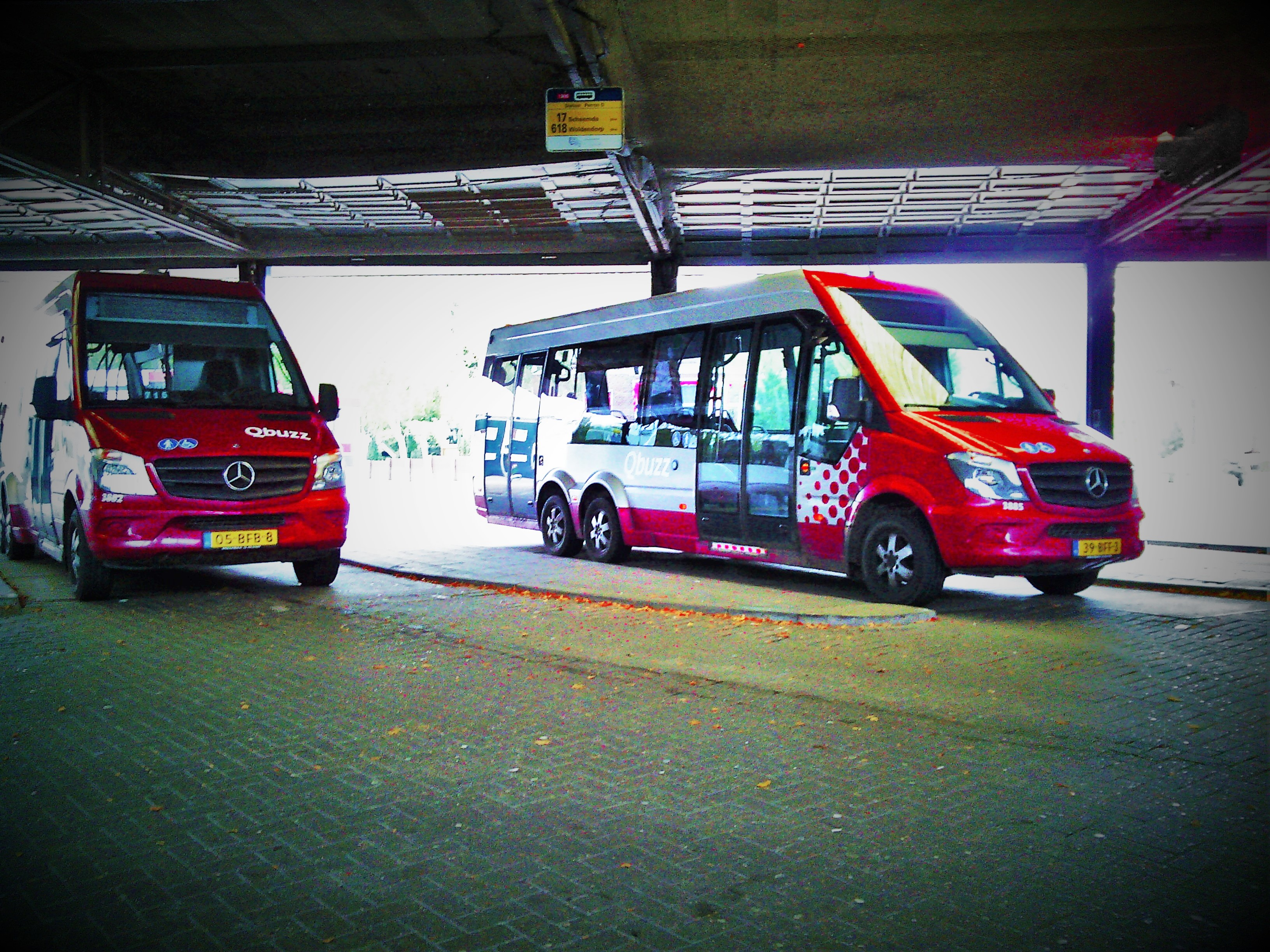
Qbuzz Mercedes-Benz Sprinter City minibuses at the former bus station in 2015

The company Qbuzz, a subsidiary of Nederlandse Spoorwegen, has the concession for bus transport in the provinces of Groningen and Drenthe until 2019. There are regional bus connections at the station in Winschoten with the following final destinations:

Line	Route	Operator	Notes
12	Winschoten - Blijham - Bellingwolde (- Klein Ulsda - Bad Nieuweschans)	Qbuzz and Taxi De Grooth	During both rush hours, one run runs through to Bad Nieuweschans. No service after 21:00, on Saturday evenings and Sundays,
13	Veendam - Muntendam - Meeden - Westerlee - Heiligerlee - Winschoten	Qbuzz, Taxi De Grooth and CTS	No weekend service and limited weekday evening service.
14	Stadskanaal - Alteveer - Onstwedde - Smeerling - Vlagtwedde - Veele - Wedde - Wedderveer - Blijham - Winschoten	Qbuzz and Taxi De Grooth	
17	Winschoten - Beerta - Finsterwolde - Oostwold - Midwolda - Scheemda	Qbuzz and Taxi De Grooth	No evening and Sunday service.
23	Winschoten - Oude Pekela - Nieuwe Pekela - Ommelanderwijk - Veendam	Qbuzz	
24	Assen - Rolde - Papenvoort - Borger - Buinen - Buinerveen - Nieuw-Buinen - Stadskanaal - Nieuwe Pekela - Oude Pekela - Winschoten	Qbuzz	On Saturdays, this bus only operates 1x per 2 hours between Assen and Stadskanaal. No evening and Sunday service.
119	Delfzijl - Wagenborgen - Nieuwolda - Scheemda - Heiligerlee - Winschoten	Qbuzz	
618	Winschoten - Beerta - Finsterwolde - Oostwold - Woldendorp	Qbuzz	Only 1 run during both rush hours.
643	Winschoten - Heiligerlee - Scheemda - Nieuw-Scheemda - 't Waar - Nieuwolda - Woldendorp	Qbuzz	Only 1 run during both rush hours.
679	Winschoten → Groningen Zernike	Qbuzz	Only 1 run during morning rush hour.
