= Ulsda railway stop =

Ulsda

General information
- Location: Ulsderweg; Ulsda, Netherlands
- Coordinates: 53°9′50″N 7°7′56″E
- Line: Harlingen–Nieuweschans railway
- Platforms: 2
- Tracks: 2
- Train operators: Staatsspoorwegen (1887–1937); Nederlandse Spoorwegen (1938)

Other information
- Station code: Ul or Uld

History
- Opened: 1 January 1887
- Closed: 15 May 1938
Location
- Location within Netherlands

Ulsda (Dutch pronunciation: [ˈʏlzdaː]; abbreviation: Ul/Uld) was a railway stop (Dutch: stopplaats) in the village of Ulsda in the Netherlands. It was situated on the Harlingen–Nieuweschans railway between Winschoten and Bad Nieuweschans. Trains called at Ulsda from 1887 until the railway stop was closed in 1938. Services were provided by Staatsspoorwegen (1887–1937) and Nederlandse Spoorwegen (1938). The stop had first a shelter (1890–1930) and later a building (1930–1950).

== Location ==
The railway stop was located at 53°9′50″N 7°7′56″E in the village of Ulsda in the east of the province of Groningen in the northeast of the Netherlands. It was situated on the Harlingen–Nieuweschans railway, also called Staatslijn B, between the railway stations of Winschoten in the west and Bad Nieuweschans in the east. The distance from Ulsda westward to railway terminus Harlingen Haven was 122 km (76 mi), to Groningen 42 km (26 mi), to Zuidbroek 20 km (12 mi), and to Winschoten 7 km (4.3 mi), and eastward to railway terminus Nieuweschans was 5 km (3.1 mi). Via the stations of Zuidbroek and Groningen the stop was connected to the rest of the Dutch railway network and via Nieuweschans it was connected to the German railway network.

== History ==
The segment of the Harlingen–Nieuweschans railway between Winschoten and Nieuweschans was opened in 1868 and Nieuweschans was connected to the German railway network in 1876. The train services started at Ulsda on 1 January 1887 and were initially provided by the Maatschappij tot Exploitatie van Staatsspoorwegen (Company for Exploitation of State Railways). In 1890, a simple wooden shelter was built which cost 562.95 guilder (255.46 euro). In 1891, two trains called at Ulsda to both directions every day.

In 1911, only one train called at the stop in each direction on Tuesdays. In 1929, there were thirteen trains in both directions on weekdays and Saturdays and nine trains in both directions on Sundays. In 1930, the shelter was replaced with a building which was moved from the Westerbroek railway stop. In 1938, train services were provided by the Nederlandse Spoorwegen (Netherlands Railways), when the Maatschappij tot Exploitatie van Staatsspoorwegen merged with the Hollandsche IJzeren Spoorweg-Maatschappij (Hollandic Iron Railroad Company), until the railway stop was closed on 15 May 1938. The building remained until 1950.

== Layout ==
In Ulsda, the unelectrified railway is oriented from west to east. At the railway stop, the single-track railway was split into two tracks. The Ulsderweg (Ulsda Road) crossed the tracks at the railway stop. The building was north of both tracks. There were two platforms, one south and one north of the tracks. Beyond the railway stop, the two tracks merged back into a single track.
