= Karel Hendrik van Brederode =

Dutch engineer and architect

K.H. van Brederode
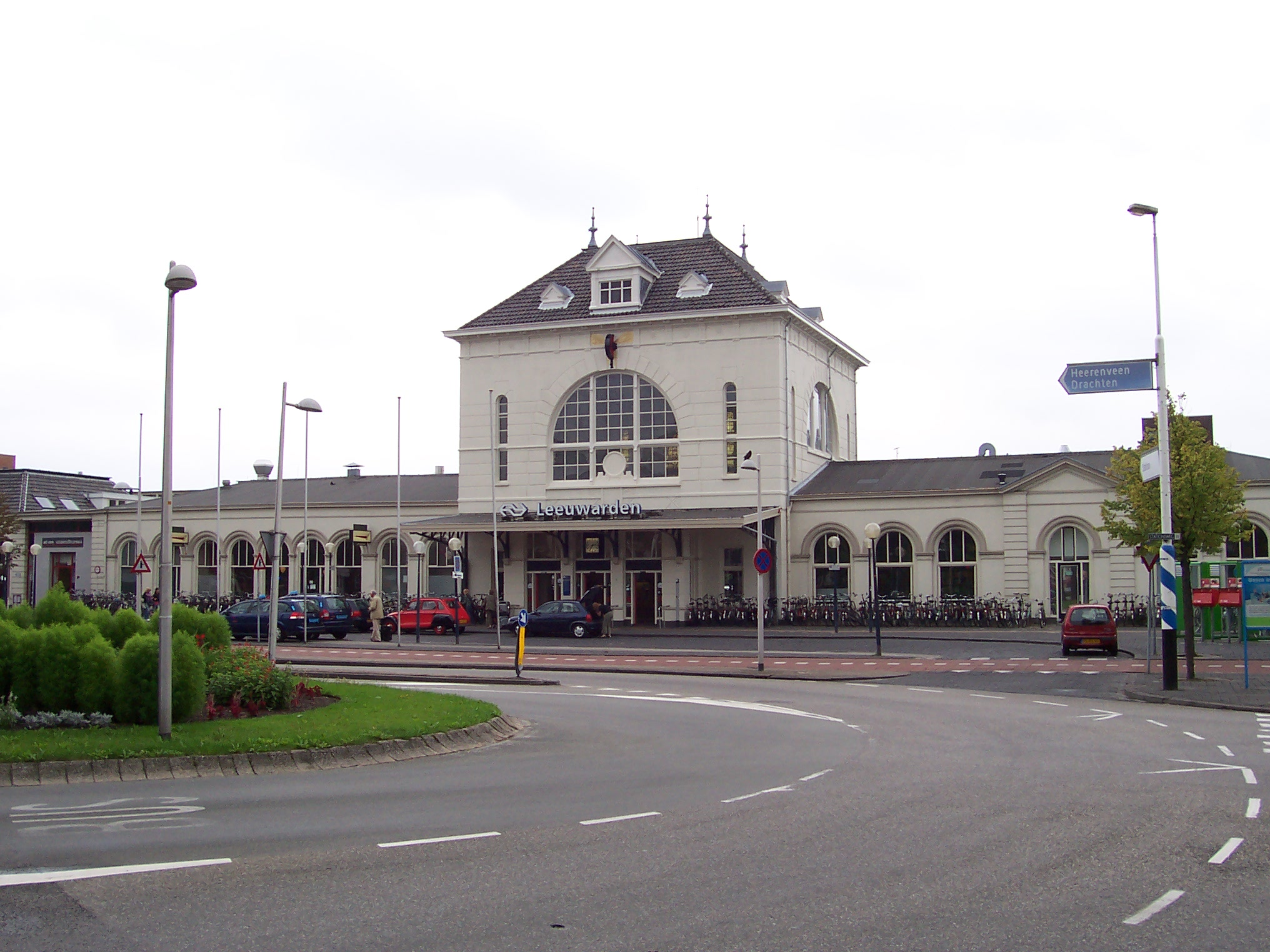
- Leeuwarden railway station was designed by Van Brederode
- Born: 11 December 1827; Haarlem, Netherlands
- Died: 19 September 1897 (aged 69); Deventer, Netherlands
- Occupation: Architect

Karel Hendrik van Brederode (Dutch pronunciation: [ˈkaːrəl ˈɦɛndrɪk fɑm ˈbreːdəˌroːdə]; (Note: In isolation, van is pronounced [vɑn].) 11 December 1827 – 19 September 1897) was a Dutch engineer and architect of railway stations. In 1847 he was cofounder of the Koninklijk Instituut van Ingenieurs in The Hague.

== Buildings ==
Over 110 railway stations in the Netherlands were built following Brederode's design. Among these were:

- Den Helder railway station (1862–1958; demolished)
- Roermond railway station (1862)
- Sittard railway station (1862–1923)
- Tilburg railway station (1862–1961; demolished)
- Harlingen railway station (1863)
- Leeuwarden railway station (1863)
- Zutphen railway station (1863–1951; demolished)
- Alkmaar railway station (1864)
- Eindhoven railway station (1864–1912; demolished)
- Hoogezand-Sappemeer railway station (1865–1989; demolished)
- Scheemda railway station (1865)
- Steenwijk railway station (1865–1972; demolished)
- Winschoten railway station (1865)
- Zuidbroek railway station (1865)
- Zwolle railway station (1866)
- Vught railway station (1866)
- Nieuweschans railway station (1867–1973; demolished)
