= Winschoten =

Winschoten Winschoot (Gronings)
- City
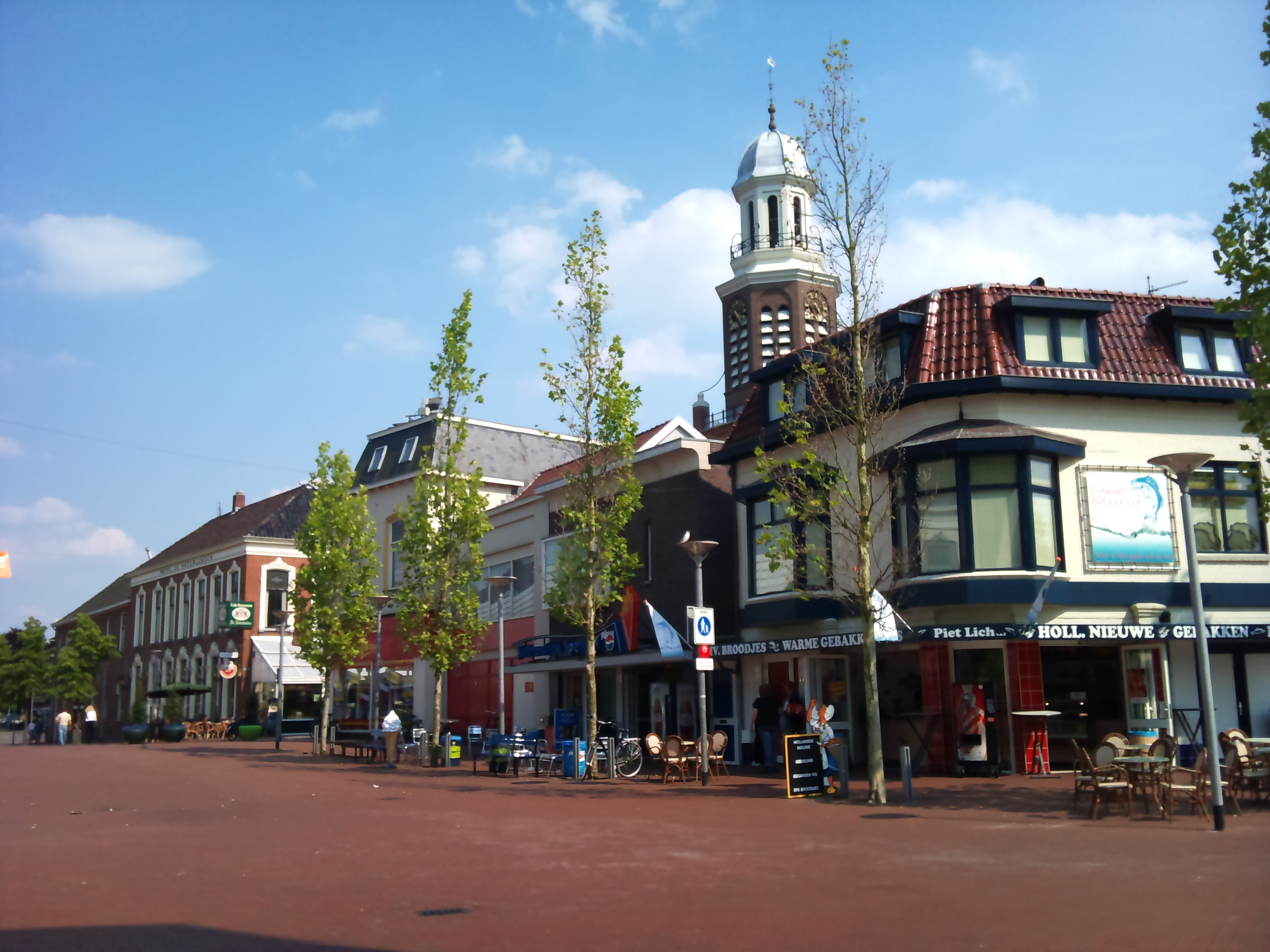
- City center of Winschoten in 2010

- Flag Coat of arms (former) brandmark
- Nicknames: Sodom, Molenstad
- Location in Groningen

- Location in the province of Groningen in the Netherlands Winschoten (Netherlands)
- Coordinates: 53°9′N 7°2′E
- Country: Netherlands
- Province: Groningen
- Municipality: Oldambt

Area (2006)
  - Total: 22.24 km^{2} (8.59 sq mi)
  - Land: 21.66 km^{2} (8.36 sq mi)
  - Water: 0.58 km^{2} (0.22 sq mi)

Population (1 January 2007)
  - Total: 18,518
  - Density: 854.9/km^{2} (2,214/sq mi)
- Time zone: UTC+1 (CET)
  - Summer (DST): UTC+2 (CEST)
- Postal code: 9670–9675
- Area code: 0597

Winschoten (Dutch: [ˈʋɪnsxoːtə(n)]; Gronings: Winschoot) is a city with a population of 18,518 in the municipality of Oldambt in the northeast of the Netherlands. It is the largest city in the region of Oldambt in the province of Groningen which has 38,213 inhabitants.

Winschoten received its city rights in 1825. It was a separate municipality until it was merged into Oldambt in 2010. The seat of government of Oldambt is in Winschoten.

There are three windmills and several churches in Winschoten. There is a railway station with direct connections to Groningen and Leer (Germany), although due to the reconstruction of the Friesenbrücke trains to Germany will stop at Weener until 2024. Winschoten has an important role as a shopping centre for the region of Oldambt. In the province of Groningen, it is the second-largest shopping destination and it attracts many consumers from nearby Germany.

== Etymology ==
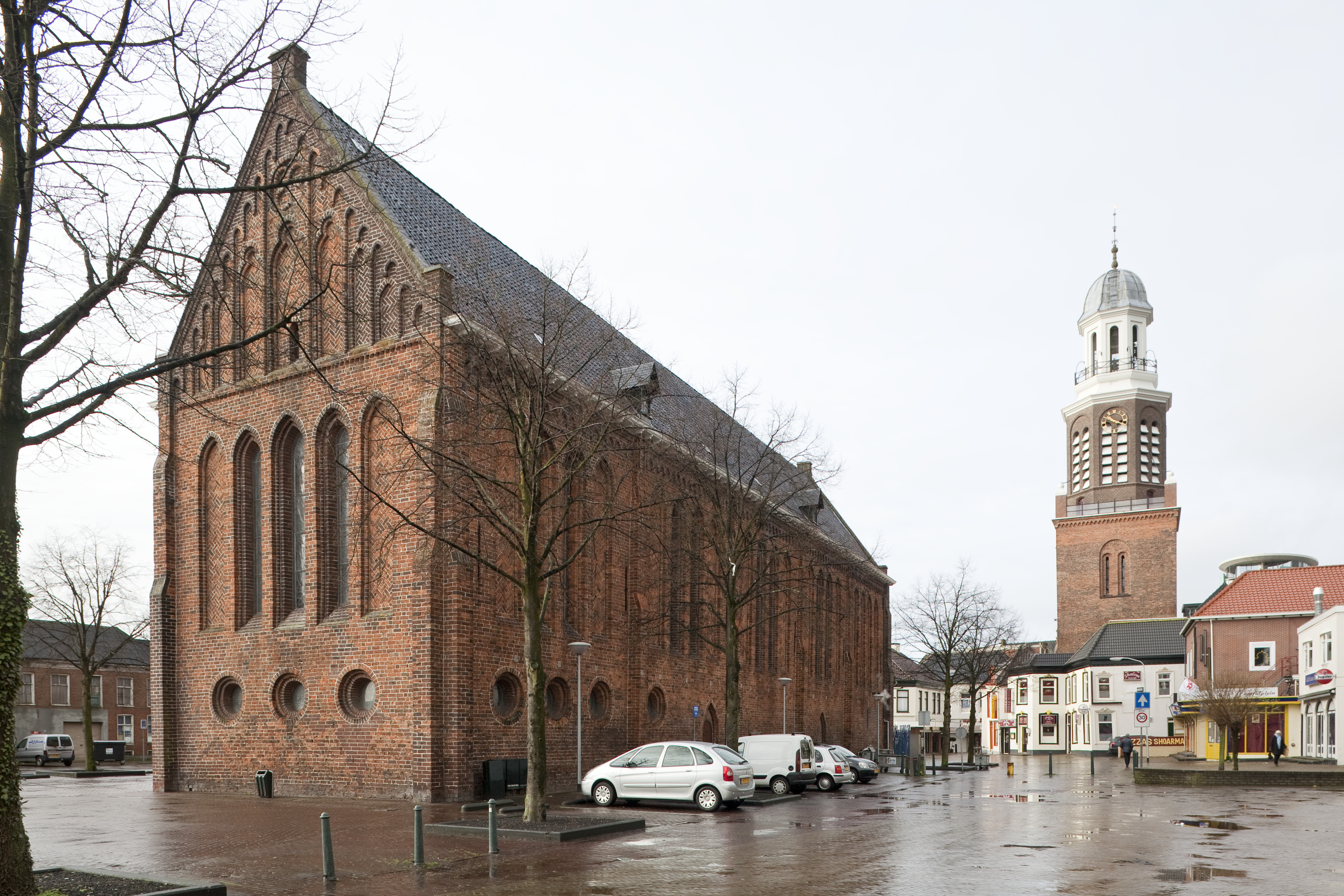
Church and tower Winschoten

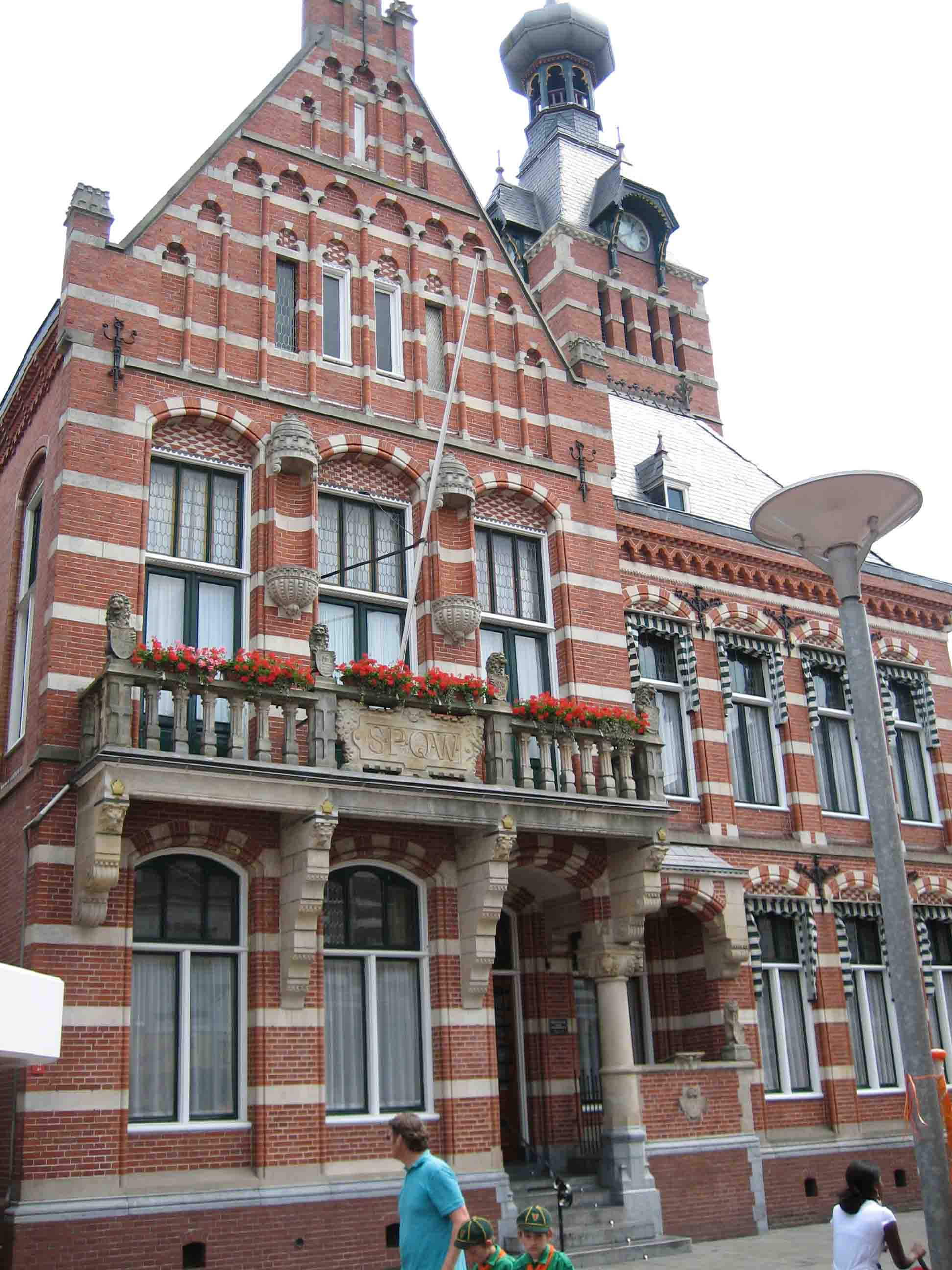
City hall Winschoten

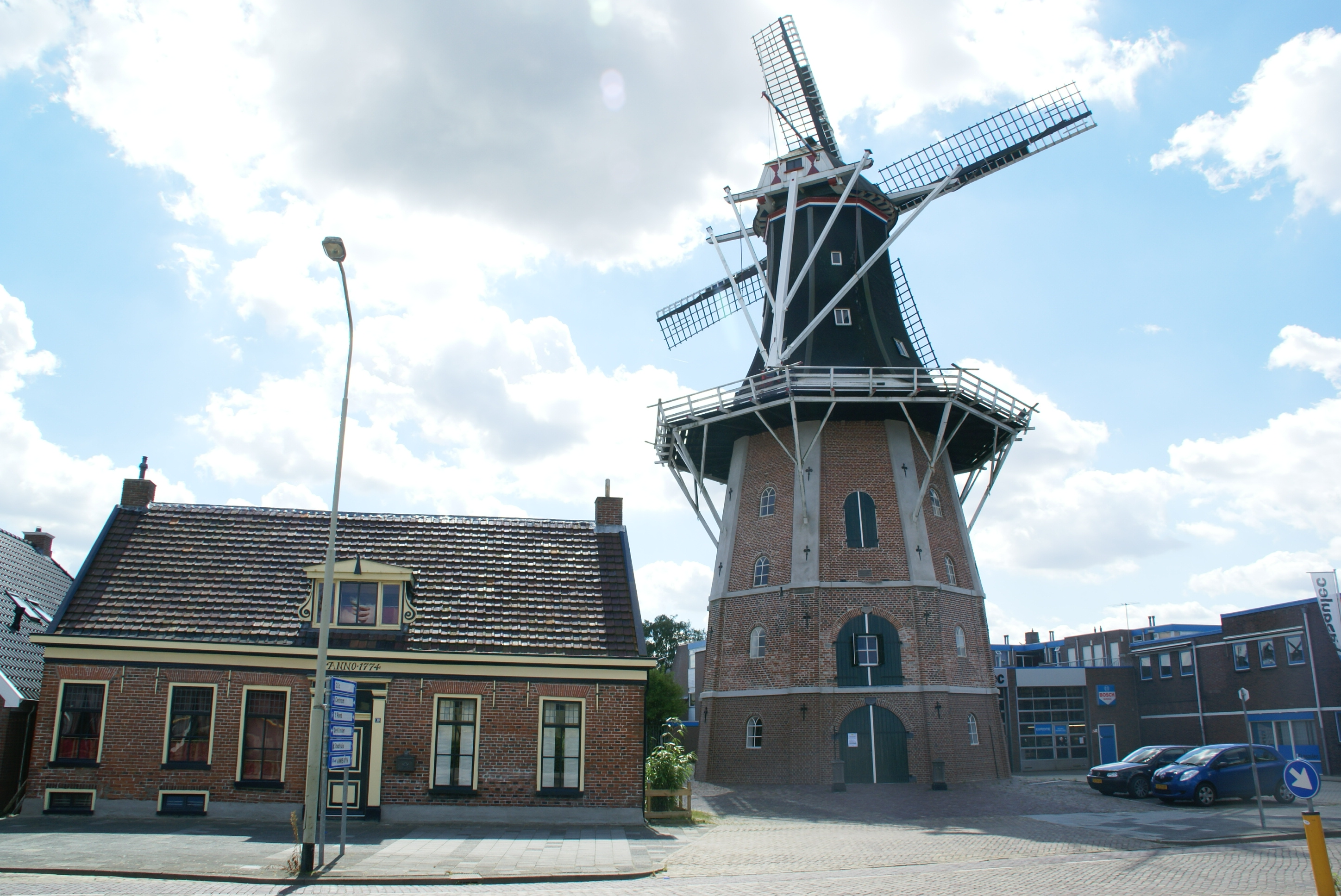
Windmill 'Edens' in Winschoten

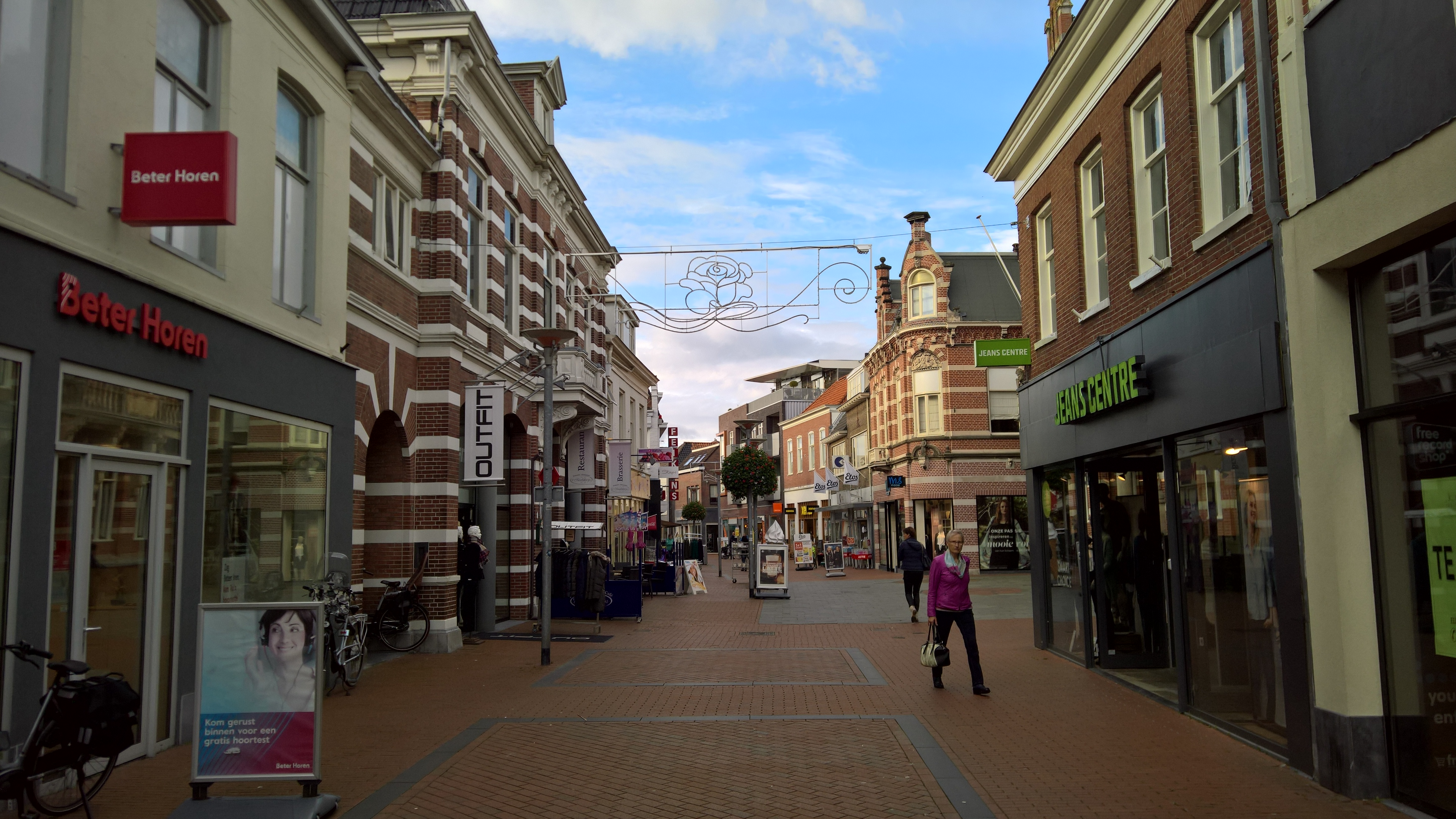
Pedestrian shopping street: Langestraat

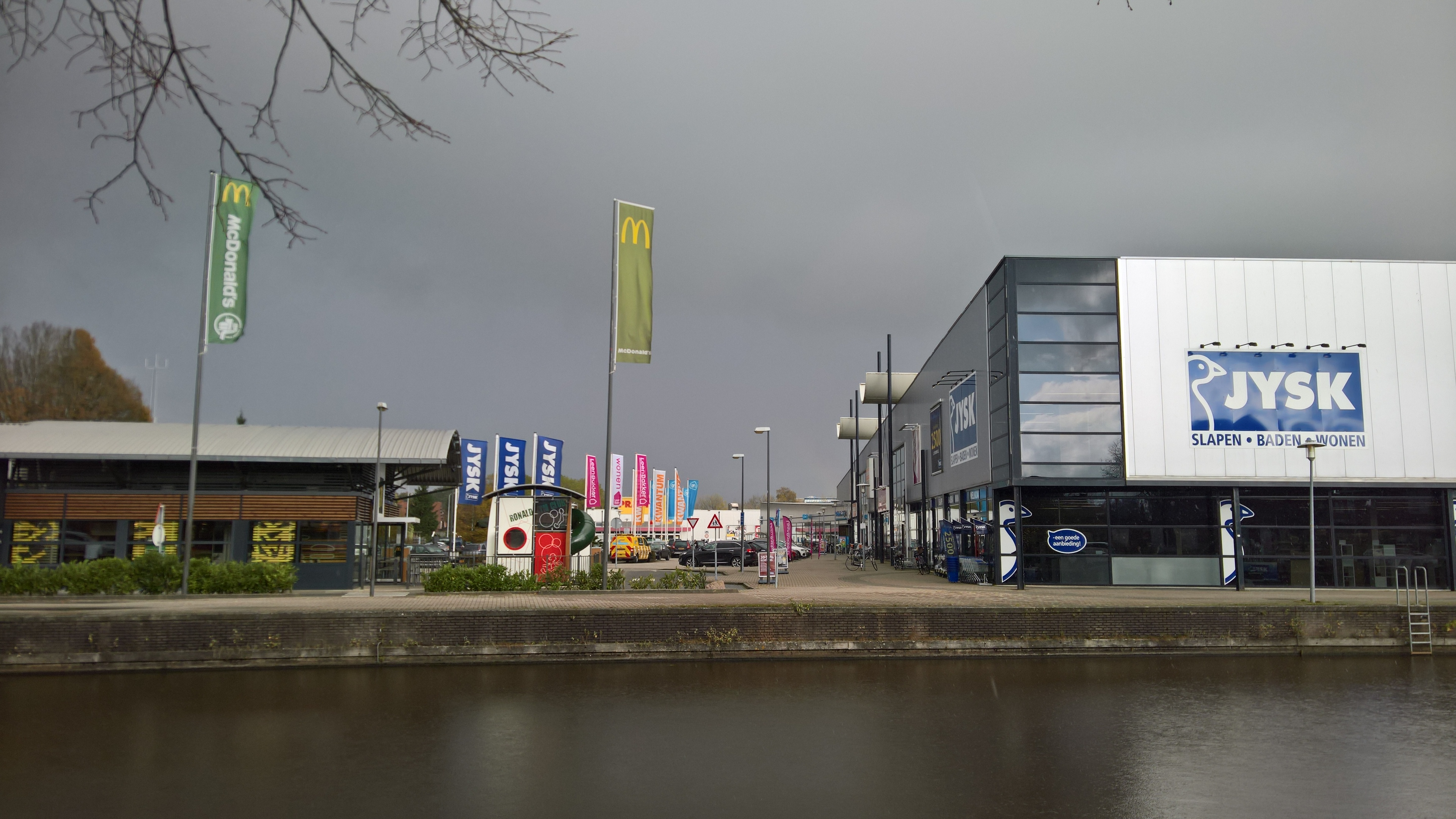
Posttil retailcentre in Winschoten

The origin of the name of Winschoten is not known but it has received nicknames. One of these is Molenstad (or Milltown). It has also been known, in living memory, as Sodom. This name arose out of the Jewish community who were scandalised by the immoral behaviour of their Gentile neighbours. The inhabitants are also called Tellerlikkers (plate lickers).

== Geography ==
Winschoten was the capital of the Oldambt district, in a fertile agricultural region. Winschoten received city rights in 1825. It was the last town in the Netherlands to be granted such rights and it was more of a symbolic gesture. The town flag has three horizontal stripes of blue and white, in ratio 1:3:1, on the white stripe is a red outline plan of a fortress with nine embattlements. It was adopted 23 May 1973 by municipal resolution. The coat of arms is an image of Saint Vitus, whose name can also be recognized in many streetnames, schoolnames names of clubs, etc.

Winschoten is located at 53°9′N 7°2′E (53.15, 7.03) in the municipality of Oldambt, in the east of the province of Groningen, and in the northeast of the Netherlands. It is situated east of Groningen, Hoogezand, and Veendam, north of Stadskanaal, south of Delfzijl, and west of Leer and Papenburg (both in Germany). It is also south of the Dollart and the Oldambtmeer.

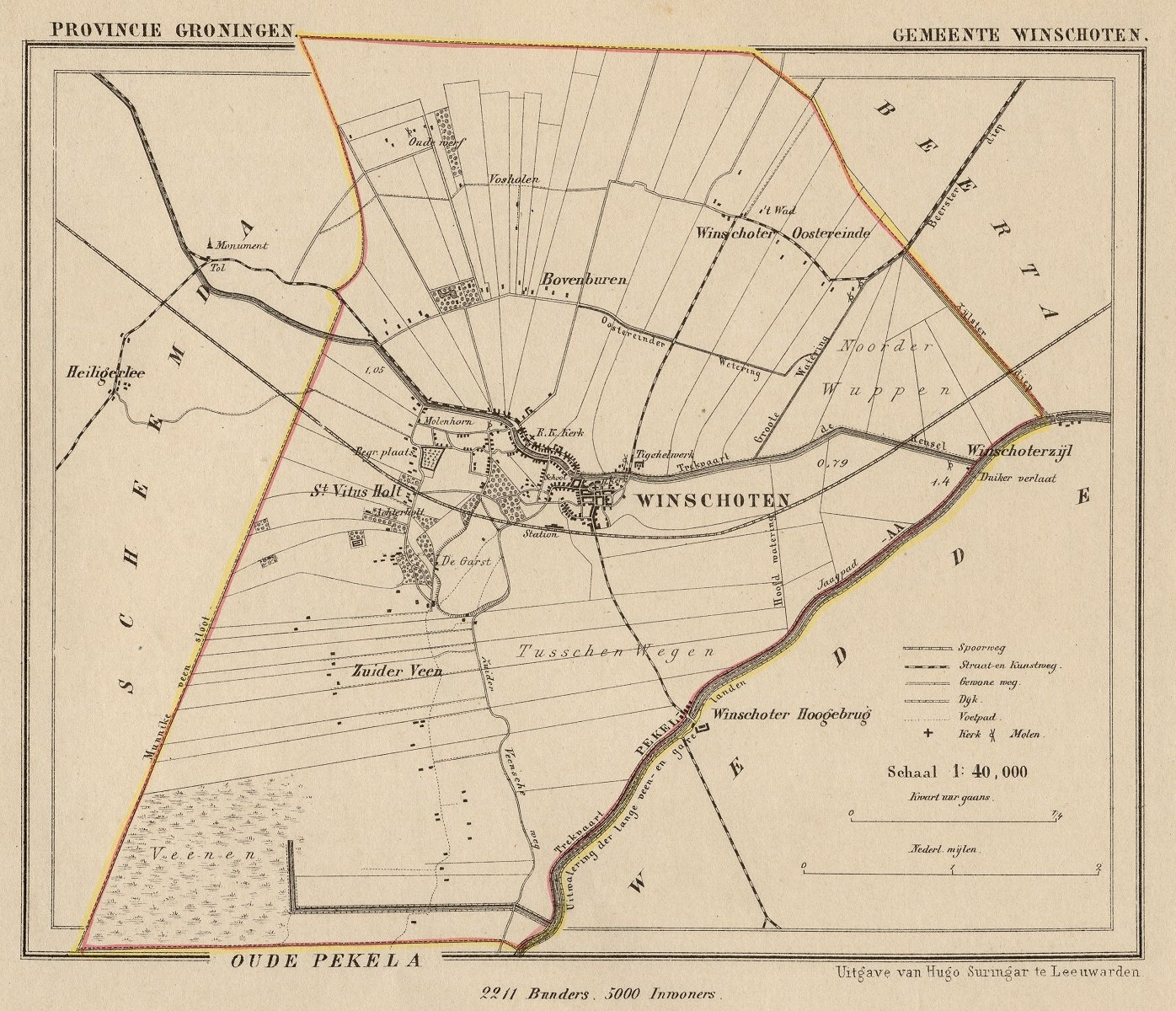
The municipality around 1870

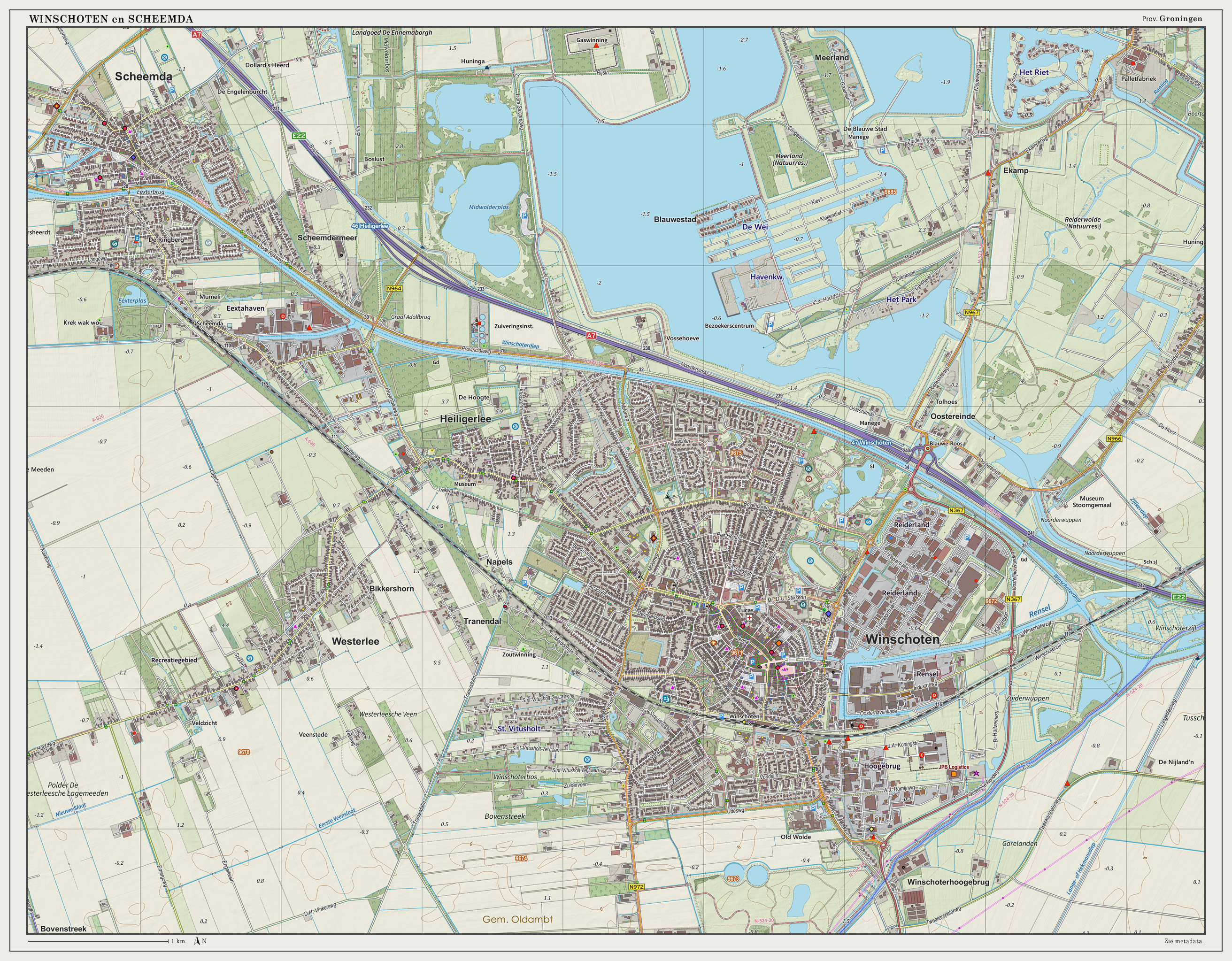
Topographic map of Winschoten, June 2014

== Windmills ==
There used to be 13 mills in Winschoten, today only three large, monumental windmills remain in the town. These mills are now owned by the local council and are run by volunteer millers. They form an important feature of the townscape and are well cared for by the local authorities for the benefit of the community and visitors.

Molen Berg, built in 1854 at the Grintweg, was designed to grind corn. Its first owner was J.D. Buurma. The unusual design of the sails with movable blades, akin to venetian blinds was in advance for its time. Traditionally Dutch windmills have tarpaulin covering the sails to control or catch the wind's power.

The Dijkstra Molen in the Nassaustraat was built in 1862 by D.E. Dijkstra. In 1953 the original owner's grandson sold it to the local government. It was restored 1982/1983 and further restoration work took place in 1995/-6 restoration.

Molen Edens, at Nassaustraat 14, was built in 1763 on the instructions of Jurrien Balles and Antje Gerbrands. Later owners were Jan Joesten and G. Eikema. Then from 1855 till 1960 various generations of the Edens family owned it. The local municipality bought it in 1960. It is the oldest mill in the entire province of Groningen.

== Churches ==
There are numerous Protestant churches in Winschoten including an assembly of Plymouth Brethren. The oldest church dates back to the 13th century in style mingling Roman and Gothic features. There is a Dutch Reformed church on Marktplein. A free-standing 16th-century bell tower is one of the features of the Winschoten skyline.

There is a Roman Catholic church dedicated to Saint Vitus, built by Alfred Tepe in 1880. It is a neo-gothic church with stained glass windows by Kocken and a sandstone high altar from Freitag in Münster. This altar was formerly placed in the Saint Boniface church in Nieuwe Pekela. When this church was demolished it was brought to Winschoten to replace an old altar.

There used to be a thriving Jewish community. During the Second World War, Winschoten was a transit port to Germany for the Jew-transports. Of the 493 Jews that lived in Winschoten at the beginning of the war, only 20 survived.

== Monuments ==
The name tellerlikker (mentioned above) was given on account of the local custom to voraciously devour their meals and conclude with licking the plate (teller - in the local dialect) clean. A monument to one of these plate lickers stands on the Oldambt Square, in front of an area where the theatre 'De Klinker', built on the site of a former brick factory, used to be. A dog in turn licks the feet of his greedy owner.

== Language ==
The official language is Dutch, but many Winschoters especially of older generations speak the local dialect called Gronings. In addition, many inhabitants are able to speak German or English. The Winschoter version of the dialect Gronings has influences of Hebrew and Yiddish as a consequence of the once prominent Jewish community that had lived there since the 18th century.

== Sports ==
Winschoten is host to the oldest Ultramarathon of the Netherlands since 1976 called De RUN. It is a race of 100 km (62 mi) run individually over a 10 km (6 mi) paved lap through the town. The current record of 06:16:41 is held by Jean-Paul Praet since 1992. During the event, that is usually held on the second Saturday of September, there is also the possibility to run a 50 km (31 mi) race or to compete with a group in a 10x10 km relay race.

Winschoten also hosted the start and finish of the first stage at the 2013 Energiewacht Tour.

== Transportation ==
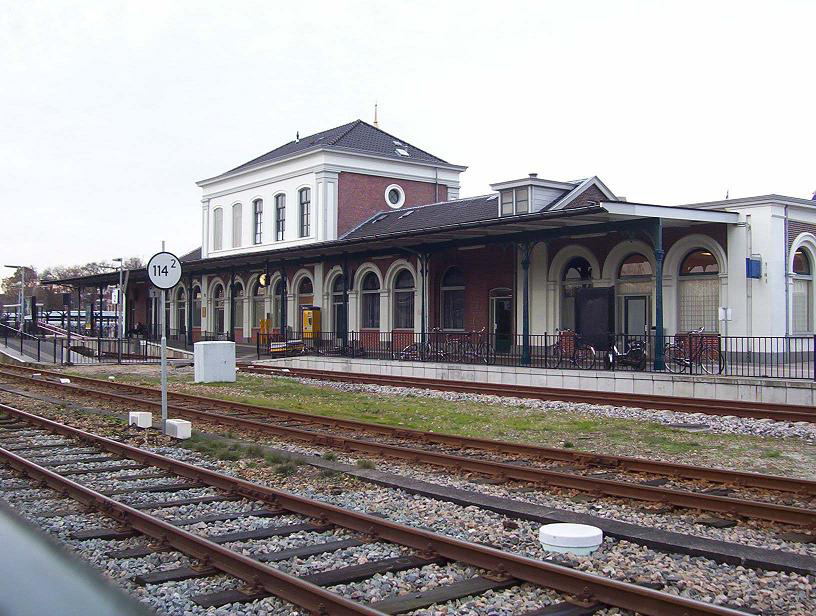
Winschoten railway station in 2006

Winschoten has a railway station with train services towards Groningen. The railway station was inaugurated 1 May 1868 to service the Groningen–Winschoten–Nieuweschans line. This was the second brought into use by the Company for the Exploitation of State Railways (Maatschappij tot Exploitatie van Staatsspoorwegen) and part of the Harlingen–Nieuweschans railway (built 1863–1868). Today this route is operated by Arriva.

Winschoten also has a road connection to the rest of the Netherlands and Germany via the A7 motorway (E22).

== Notable people ==
- Wiebbe Hayes (c. 1608), Dutch soldier and national hero in the 17th century
- Arnold Hendrik Koning (1860–1945), Dutch painter
- Dirk Stikker (1897–1979), Dutch minister of Foreign Affairs (1948–1952) and NATO Secretary-General (1961–1964)
- Bernard D. H. Tellegen (1900–1990), Dutch engineer and inventor
- Jaap Meijer (1912–1993), Dutch historian and poet
- Herman Makkink, (1937–2013), Dutch sculptor, graphic artist, and illustrator
- Klaas Nuninga (1940) Dutch footballer and official
- Bas Jan Ader (1942–lost at sea 1975), Dutch artist
- Piet Hamberg (1954), Dutch footballer and football manager
- Henriëtte Weersing (1965), Dutch volleyball player
- Marcel Hensema (1970), Actor
- Bert Zuurman (1973), Dutch footballer
- Marnix Kolder (1981), Dutch footballer
- Marcel Seip (1982), Dutch footballer
