= Heiligerlee railway stop =

Heiligerlee

General information
- Location: Heiligerlee, Netherlands
- Coordinates: 53°9′16″N 6°59′55″E
- Line: Harlingen–Nieuweschans railway
- Platforms: 2
- Tracks: 2
- Train operators: Staatsspoorwegen

Other information
- Station code: Hle

History
- Opened: 1 January 1908
- Closed: 15 May 1934
Location
- Location within Netherlands

Heiligerlee (Dutch pronunciation: [ˌɦɛiləɣərˈleː]; abbreviation: Hle) was a railway stop (Dutch: stopplaats) in the village of Heiligerlee in the Netherlands. It was located on the Harlingen–Nieuweschans railway between the railway stations of Scheemda and Winschoten in the province of Groningen. Trains operated by Staatsspoorwegen called at Heiligerlee from 1908 until the railway stop was closed in 1934.

== Location ==
The railway stop was located at 53°09′16″N 06°59′55″E in the village of Heiligerlee in the east of the province of Groningen in the northeast of the Netherlands. It is situated on the Harlingen–Nieuweschans railway between the railway stations of Scheemda in the east and Winschoten in the west.

== History ==
The segment of the Harlingen–Nieuweschans railway between the railway stations of Groningen and Winschoten was opened in 1868. The train services at Heiligerlee started on 1 January 1908 and were provided by Maatschappij tot Exploitatie van Staatsspoorwegen. The stop was closed on 15 May 1934.

== Layout ==
The double track railway passed through Heiligerlee from northwest to southeast. The public road crossed the railway just before the railway stop. At the stop, there were two platforms, one north and one south of the tracks.
