= Ulsda =

- Hamlet
- Location within Groningen (province) Location within Netherlands
- Coordinates: 53°10′N 07°08′E
- Country: Netherlands
- Province: Groningen
- Municipality: Oldambt

Ulsda (Dutch pronunciation: [ˈʏlzdaː]; Gronings: Olsde) is a hamlet in the municipality of Oldambt in the northeast of the Netherlands.

Between 1887 and 1938 there was a railway stop in Ulsda. Ulsda was home to 44 people in 1840. Nowadays, it consists of a handful of houses.
