= Bad Nieuweschans railway station =

Railway station in Bad Nieuweschans, Netherlands

Bad Nieuweschans
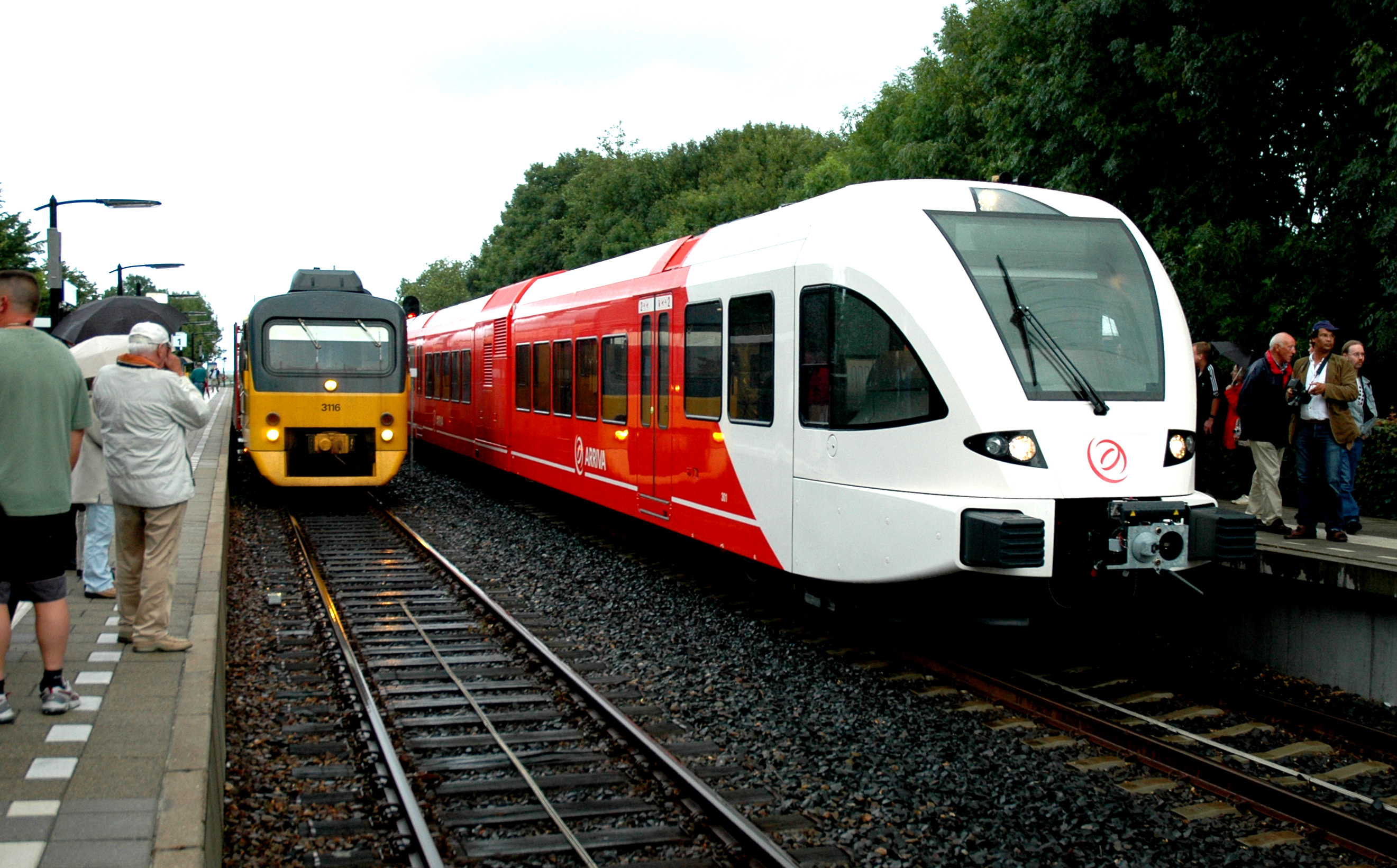
- Bad Nieuweschans railway station in 2006

General information
- Location: Stationsstraat 4 Bad Nieuweschans, Netherlands
- Coordinates: 53°11′03″N 7°11′58″E
- Operator: NS Stations
- Lines: Harlingen–Nieuweschans railway Ihrhove–Nieuweschans railway
- Platforms: 2
- Tracks: 2
- Train operators: Arriva
- Bus operators: Qbuzz
- Connections: Bus lines: 811, 817

Other information
- Station code: Nsch

History
- Opened: 1 November 1868
- Former names: Nieuweschans (1868–2013)

Services
Preceding station	Arriva Netherlands	Following station
Winschoten towards Groningen	Stoptrein 20100	Weener towards Leer
Winschoten towards Groningen	Stoptrein 37500	Terminus
Location
- Location within Netherlands

Bad Nieuweschans (Dutch pronunciation: [bɑt ˈniu.əsxɑns]; abbreviation: Nsch), previously named Nieuweschans (1868–2013), is an unstaffed railway station in the village of Bad Nieuweschans, Netherlands. It connects the Harlingen–Nieuweschans and Ihrhove–Nieuweschans railways and is situated between Winschoten, Netherlands and Weener, Germany.

The station building was completed in 1867 and demolished in 1973. Train services started on 1 November 1868. Trains were operated by Staatsspoorwegen (1868–1937), Nederlandse Spoorwegen (1938–2000), NoordNed (2000–2005), and Arriva (2006–present).

The station has two tracks and two platforms. There are two local train services with trains every hour to and from Groningen and Leer (Germany). There are also two bus connections at the station provided by Qbuzz.

== Location ==
The railway station is located at the Stationsstraat in the village of Bad Nieuweschans. It is the easternmost station in the Netherlands and connects the Dutch railway network in the west with the German railway network in the east. The station is the eastern terminus of the Harlingen–Nieuweschans railway after Winschoten, which leads towards Zuidbroek and Groningen. The Ulsda railway stop was between Winschoten and Nieuweschans between 1887 and 1938. The station is also the western terminus of the Ihrhove–Nieuweschans railway after Weener, which leads towards Leer in Germany. The distance from Bad Nieuweschans westward to railway terminus Harlingen Haven is 127 km (79 mi), to Groningen 46 km (29 mi), to Zuidbroek 25 km (16 mi), and to Winschoten 12 km (7.5 mi). The distance from Bad Nieuweschans eastward to Weener is 16 km (9.9 mi) and to railway terminus Ihrhove 24 km (15 mi).

== History ==
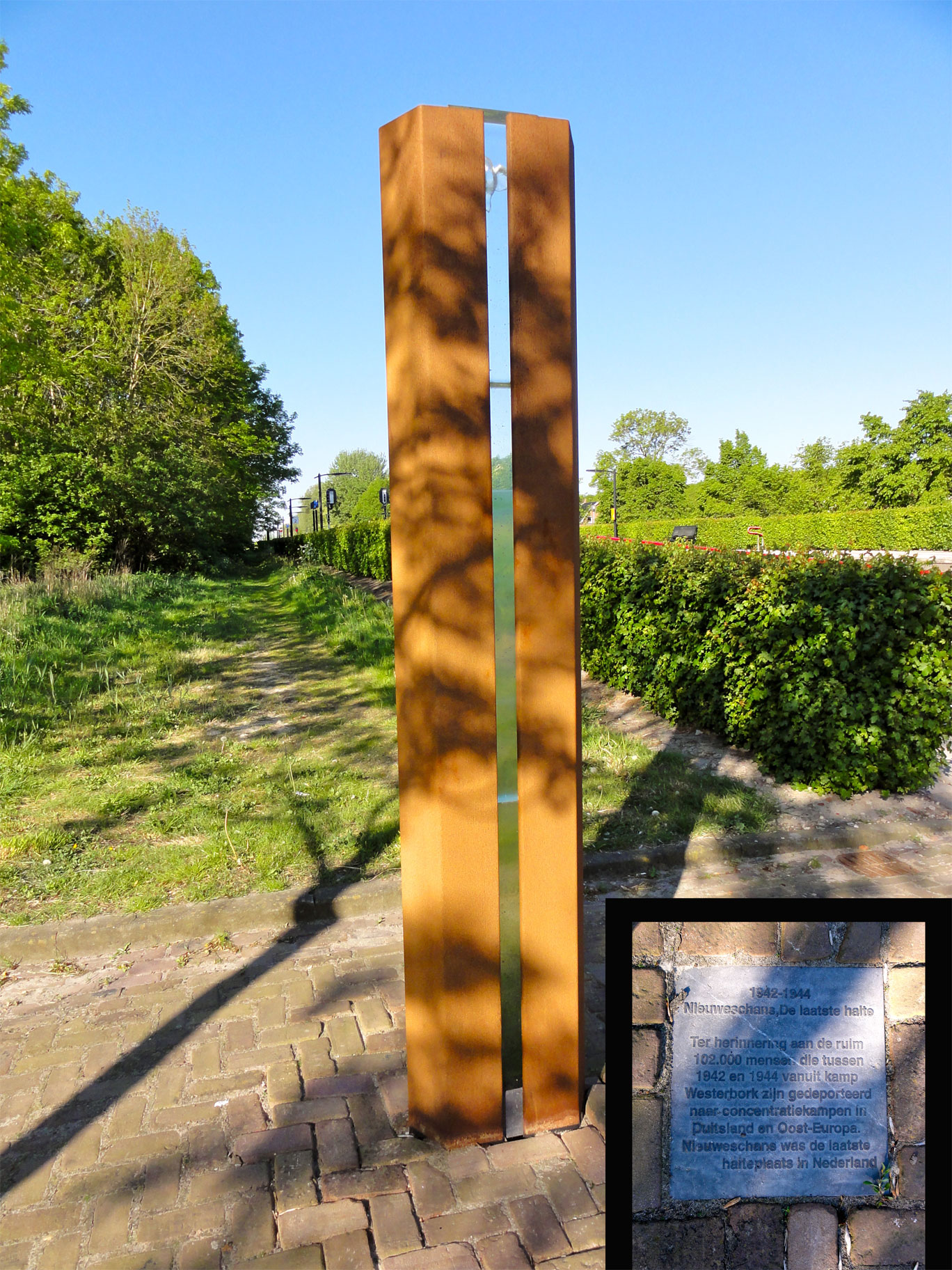
The sculpture De laatste blik commemorates that more than 102,000 people were transported to concentration camps during World War II

The station building was completed in 1867. It was one of nine buildings in the Netherlands of the type SS Hoogezand etc. designed by Karel Hendrik van Brederode. There was a customs office next to the station building. The segment of the Harlingen–Nieuweschans railway between Winschoten and Nieuweschans, as it was then called, was opened on 1 November 1868. The Ihrhove–Nieuweschans railway was opened on 26 November 1876. Trains were operated by Maatschappij tot Exploitatie van Staatsspoorwegen until 1937.

Georges Simenon's story Maigret and the Hundred Gibbets (1931) starts in this station. From 1938 to 2000, trains were operated by the Nederlandse Spoorwegen, which was formed when the Maatschappij tot Exploitatie van Staatsspoorwegen and the Hollandsche IJzeren Spoorweg-Maatschappij merged. In order to escape the Holocaust, Jewish physicist Lise Meitner escaped from Nazi Germany to the Netherlands, on her way to Sweden via this train station on the border. During World War II, between 1942 and 1944, more than 102,000 people were transported from the Westerbork transit camp to Nazi concentration camps. Nieuweschans was the last station in the Netherlands they passed, which is commemorated with the sculpture De laatste blik (The Last View). The station building was demolished in 1973.

Trains service have been provided by NoordNed from 2000 to 2005, and by Arriva since 2006. On 15 December 2013, the village was renamed from Nieuweschans to Bad Nieuweschans and the station name was changed accordingly. In December 2015, a railway bridge near Weener was destroyed in a collision with the ship Emsmoon, and the Ihrhove–Nieuweschans railway has been closed since.

== Station layout ==
The railway through Bad Nieuweschans is unelectrified and oriented west to east. At the station, the single-track railway splits into two tracks. There are two platforms, platform 1 is north of the northern track and platform 2 is south of the southern track. Beyond the station the tracks merge back into a single track.

== Train services ==
Route	Service type	Operator	Notes
Groningen – Hoogezand-Sappemeer – Zuidbroek – Winschoten – Bad Nieuweschans – Leer (Germany)	Local ("Stoptrein")	Arriva	1x per hour
Groningen – Hoogezand-Sappemeer – Zuidbroek – Winschoten (- Bad Nieuweschans)	Local ("Stoptrein")	Arriva	During morning rush hour and on evenings, a couple of runs run through to Bad Nieuweschans.

== Bus services ==
Line	Route	Operator	Notes
620	Leer – Coldam – Weener – Möhlenwarf – Bunde (- Bunderneuland – Bad Nieuweschans)	Weser-Ems Bus	Only two rush hour runs run through to Bad Nieuweschans.
817	Bad Nieuweschans – Nieuw Beerta – Drieborg – Ganzedijk – Finsterwolde	Taxi De Grooth	Only one run during both rush hours.
