= NoordNed =

Transport company

NoordNed Personenvervoer
- Company type: Besloten vennootschap
- Industry: Public transport
- Founded: 1999
- Founder: Arriva; Nederlandse Spoorwegen
- Defunct: 2005
- Headquarters: Netherlands
- Parent: Arriva
- Website: www.noordned-ov.nl

NoordNed Personenvervoer B.V. (English translation Network North) was a public transport company operating trains and buses in the north and northeast of the Netherlands. Founded in 1999 as a joint venture by Arriva and Nederlandse Spoorwegen, after Arriva took full ownership in 2003, the brand was retired in 2005.

== History ==
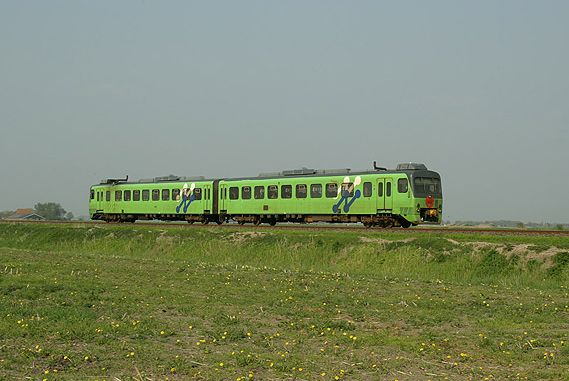
NoordNed train

NoordNed was established by Arriva and Nederlandse Spoorwegen, each having a 49% shareholding. In May 1999 it commenced operating regional train services on the Leeuwarden to Harlingen and Leeuwarden to Stavoren lines. It also operated rail services between Leeuwarden and Groningen on behalf of Nederlandse Spoorwegen.

On 28 May 2000 it commenced operating services between Groningen and Nieuweschans, and Roodeschool under a five-year concession.

In December 2003, Arriva became the sole owner. In December 2005, NoordNed commenced operating 15 year contracts in Groningen and Friesland. In December 2005 the NoordNed brand was retired with all operations merged with Arriva's other Netherlands operations.
