= Harlingen–Nieuweschans railway =

Railway line in Friesland, Netherlands

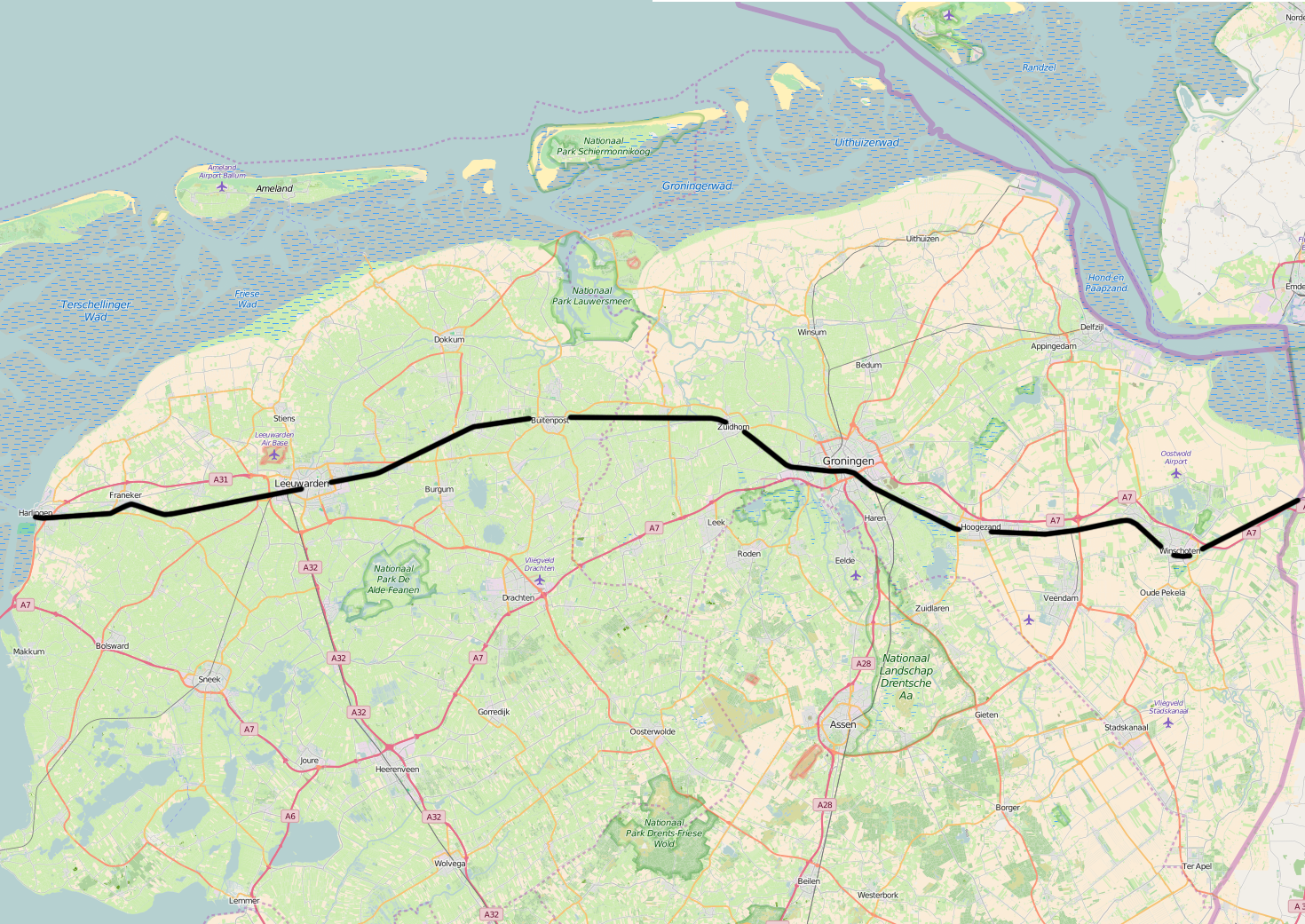
- Map of the trajectory

Overview
- Status: Operational
- Locale: Netherlands
- Termini: Harlingen Haven railway station; Bad Nieuweschans railway station

Service
- Operator(s): Nederlandse Spoorwegen

History
- Opened: 1863–1868

Technical
- Line length: 127 km (79 mi)
- Number of tracks: single track (rail), two sections double track
- Track gauge: 1,435 mm (4 ft 8 1/2 in) standard gauge
- Electrification: no

The Harlingen–Nieuweschans railway is a railway line in the Netherlands running from the port of Harlingen to Bad Nieuweschans, passing through Leeuwarden and Groningen. The line was opened between 1863 and 1868. It is also known as the Staatslijn "B". At Bad Nieuweschans, a connection with the German railway network is provided through the Ihrhove–Nieuweschans railway.

== History ==
The Frisian Port of Harlingen was meant to be a segment in an international transport-chain between Great Britain and Eurasia. Already in 1845 some Belgian engineers Xavier Tarte and Castillion Du Portail projected and developed a Pan-European Railway junction between Spain via Paris, Wallonië Maastricht- Arnhem- Zwolle onto Harlingen via Leeuwarden, and from Harlingen via Leeuwarden, Groningen and the German border, Nieuweschans onto the Northern German ports Bremen-Hamburg.

It was not until the 1860s before a part of this plan could be completed by the former Dutch government, the administration of mister Thorbecke and the Law to reorganise the statal debts, mr Van Hall. This administration committed the railway-constructions all over the Netherlands outside the so-called pre-occupied presumen 'Economical heart' the 'Randstad-Holland' including the political advanted main-seaports Rotterdam and above all, Seaport Amsterdam-IJmound. Benearth the junction (Vlissingen-port)-Breda- Tilburg, With the railway junction Harlingen-Leeuwarden (1863) and Leeuwarden - Leer Germany (1867) Harlingen was the very first harbour that by Administration of the Dutch government directly had been connected with the European hinterland.

Although Harlingen-port was advanced in connecting seaways at the time (until the 1850s) Harlingen did not have any changes to develop its port and direct railway connection with Northern Europe, Russia Scandinavia and Baltic States. Moreover, by this time, Harlingen Port had to take the opportunity, to get better connected by railway because of the Law 'Natura-2000' and 'Geomorphological regulations seabed biotope'. The present administration of the ministry of Infrastructure and Environment (I&M) refuses any co-operation in developing Port Harlingen as a partner-port of Randstad ARA-Mainports.

== Stations ==
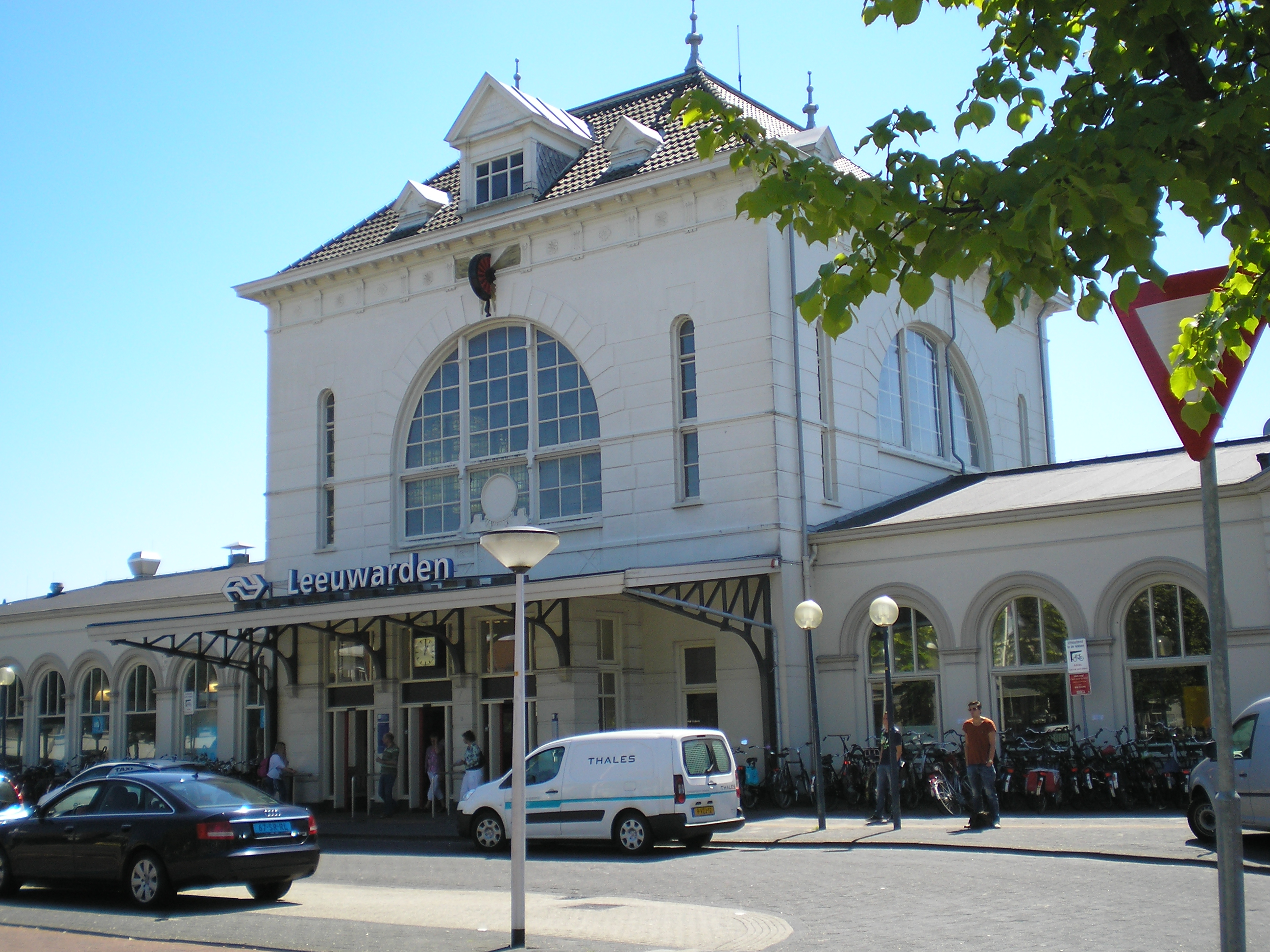
Leeuwarden railway station in 2013

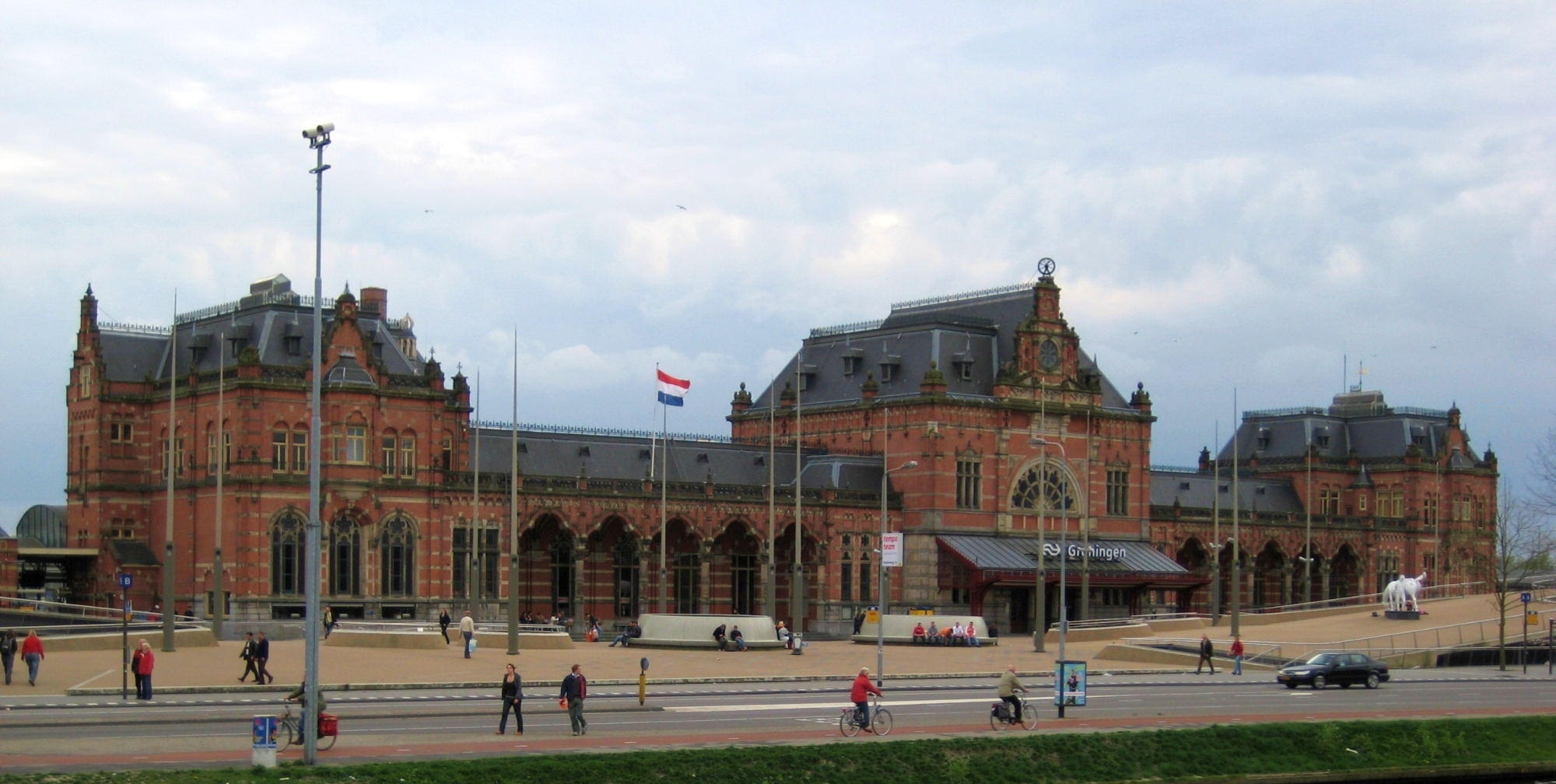
Groningen railway station in 2008

The main interchange stations on the Harlingen–Nieuweschans railway are:

- Leeuwarden: to Utrecht, Zwolle, and Stavoren
- Groningen: to Utrecht, Zwolle, Delfzijl and Roodeschool
- Zuidbroek: to Veendam
- Bad Nieuweschans: to Leer (Germany)

All stations and stops on the railway are:

- Harlingen Haven (1863–present)
- Harlingen (1863–present)
- Franeker (1863–present)
- Dronrijp (1863–present)
- Deinum (1863–present)
- Leeuwarden (1863–present)
- Leeuwarden Achter de Hoven (1915–2018)
- Leeuwarden Camminghaburen (1991–present)
- Ouddeel (1915–1947)
- Tietjerk (1866–1950)
- Hurdegaryp (1866–present)
- Feanwâlden (1866–present)
- De Westereen (1885–present)
- Wildpad (1885–1887)
- Veenklooster-Twijzel (1921–1938)
- Buitenpost (1866–present)
- Visvliet (1892–1991)
- Grijpskerk (1866–present)
- Zuidhorn (1866–present)
- Den Horn (1885–1938)
- Hoogkerk-Vierverlaten (1866–1951)
- Groningen (1866–present)
- Groningen Europapark (2007–present)
- Westerbroek (1905–1932)
- Kropswolde (1868–present)
- Martenshoek (1868–present)
- Hoogezand-Sappemeer (1868–present)
- Sappemeer Oost (1887–2020)
- Scholte (1933–1935)
- Zuidbroek (1868–present)
- Scheemda (1868–present)
- Heiligerlee (1908–1934)
- Winschoten (1868–present)
- Ulsda (1887–1938)
- Bad Nieuweschans (1868–present)
