= Staatslijn =

Railway line in the Netherlands

A staatslijn (Dutch pronunciation: [ˈstaːtslɛin]; English: state line) is a railway that was established as a result of the railway law passed on 18 August 1860 by the State in the Netherlands. 10 of these lines were built and utilized by the Maatschappij tot Exploitatie van Staatsspoorwegen. These are:

- Staatslijn A: Arnhem–Leeuwarden railway
- Staatslijn B: Harlingen–Nieuweschans railway
- Staatslijn C: Meppel–Groningen railway
- Staatslijn D: Zutphen–Glanerbeek railway
- Staatslijn E: Breda–Eindhoven railway, Venlo–Eindhoven railway and Maastricht–Venlo railway
- Staatslijn F: Roosendaal–Vlissingen railway
- Staatslijn G: Dutch part of the Viersen–Venlo railway
- Staatslijn H: Utrecht–Boxtel railway
- Staatslijn I: Breda–Rotterdam railway
- Staatslijn K: Den Helder–Amsterdam railway
