= Jürgen Ahrend =

German organ builder (1930–2024)

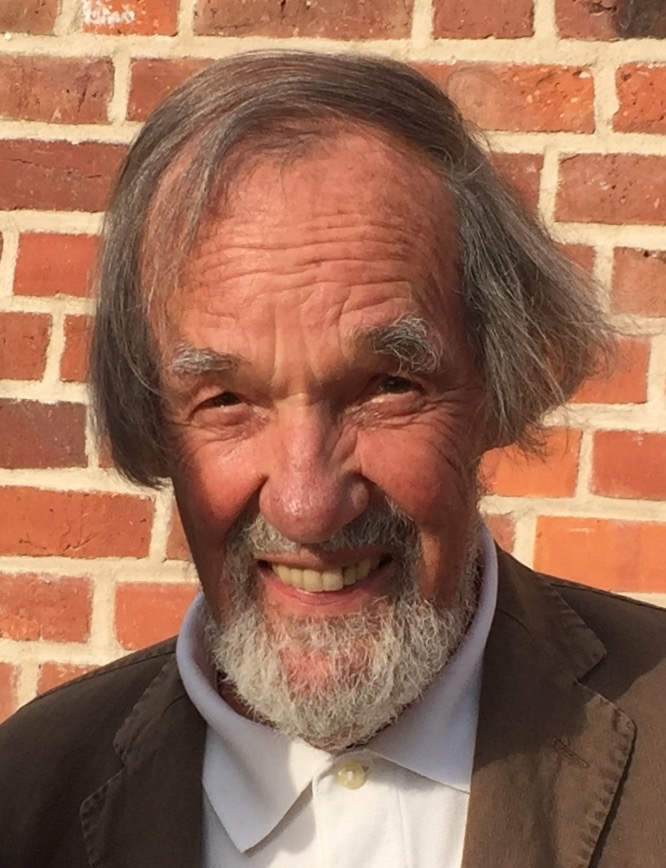
- Ahrend in 2019
- Born: 28 April 1930; Treuenhagen, Prussia, German Republic
- Died: 1 August 2024 (aged 94); Leer, Lower Saxony, Germany
- Occupation: Organ builder
- Organizations: Jürgen Ahrend Orgelbau
- Awards: Lower Saxony State Prize

Jürgen Ahrend (German pronunciation: [ˈjʏʁɡn̩ ˈʔaːʁənt]; 28 April 1930 – 1 August 2024) was a German organbuilder and technician. He restored instruments such as the Gothic Rysum organ and the Arp Schnitger organs of the Martinikerk in Groningen, Netherlands, and of St. Jacobi in Hamburg as well as building organs of his own creation. He presided over his eponymous firm, Jürgen Ahrend Orgelbau in Leer, from 1972 to 2004, operating internationally.

== Life and career ==
=== Early and personal life ===
Ahrend was born in Treuenhagen, a village near Göttingen, on 28 April 1930. His father, Heinrich Ahrend, was an administrative employee by profession; however, he maintained a stringent passion for music, being a singer and choir director who also played various instruments. Following the destructive events of World War II, his mother Elisabeth became a single mother to her five children (including Jürgen). His first marriage was to Margarete Bartels; following their divorce, she married the Dutch organist Klaas Bolt. They had five children: two of them have taken up musical professions, Seivert and Heiko (musicians, composers, and music producers). His most famous child, Henrik (born 11 August 1963), is the current head of the organbuilding firm he founded.

=== Organbuilding and workshops ===
From 1946 to 1948, he held an apprenticeship in the firm of Paul Ott, a Neo-Baroque organbuilding firm in Göttingen. He then worked for the firm as an employee. He undertook study travel with Gerhard Brunzema, who had also been an apprentice of Ott, to European organ builders, Metzler Orgelbau in Switzerland, Flentrop in the Netherlands and Marcussen & Søn in Denmark. The two formed a partnership in Leer–Loga, Lower Saxony in 1954, which they called Ahrend und Brunzema. They produced 54 new organs and restored nineteen, until Brunzema left the firm in 1972 to work in Canada. They restored the original tuning of organs from the Renaissance and Baroque eras, beginning with the Westerhusen organ, the Uttum organ and the Gothic Rysum organ. When they built a new organ in Baroque style for the Zorgvlietkerk in Scheveningen in 1958, they received international recognition. They built a new transept organ for the Oude Kerk in Amsterdam and a new organ for the Doopsgezinde Kerk in Haarlem, and restored instruments of the Waalse Kerk in Amsterdam and the Hooglandse Kerk in Leiden.

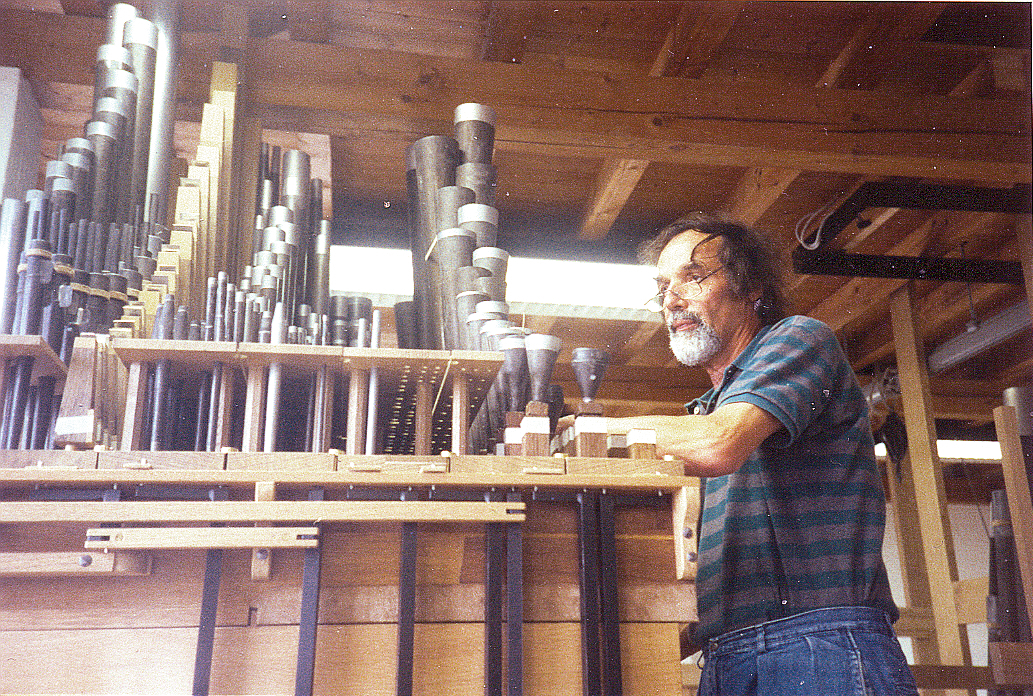
Ahrend in his workshop in 1992

The workshop operated as Jürgen Ahrend Orgelbau from 1972. Ahrend was also commissioned to restore the organs and their tuning for the Arp Schnitger organs in the Martinikerk in Groningen (including the main organ in the west gallery), the organ of St. Jacobi in Hamburg and organ of St. Ludgeri in Norden. In Hamburg, the organ pipes had been removed from the organ case for safety in 1942. The church was destroyed by bombing. In the restored church, Ahrend used the historic pipes in a new case to revive the sound he had in mind.

Ahrend used several historic building techniques in his restoration work. He devoted about half of the workshop's time to restoration. He restored internationally, such as the organ of Frederiksborg Castle in Hillerød and the Martinikerk. He was interviewed extensively in the film Martinikerk Rondeau, released in 2009.

Since 2005 his son Hendrik Ahrend has run the workshop. Jürgen Ahrend became involved in the organ festival Orgelfrühling in Krummhörn from its beginning. The 2020 edition was dedicated to him to honour his 90th birthday, but it could not be held until 2022 due to the COVID-19 pandemic.

Ahrend died in Leer, Lower Saxony, on 1 August 2024, at the age of 94.

== Awards ==
- 1962, Staatspreis für Kunsthandwerk Niedersachsen (State Prize for Craftsmanship in Lower Saxony)
- 1986, Lower Saxony State Prize for culture
- 2000, Honorary doctorate of law from the Monash University, Victoria, Australia
- 2007, The Buxtehude Prize from the city of Lübeck.

== Works ==
Roman number = number of manuals
Arabian number = number of stops
P = independent pedal
p = pull down pedal
R = restoration
Rc = reconstruction
NB = new built

=== Ahrend & Brunzema (1954–1971) ===
year	opus	town	church	picture	kind	manuals	stops	information
1954/88	1	Larrelt (D)	Larrelt church		R	I/p	11	organ
1955	4	Westerhusen (D)	Westerhusen Church		R	I/p	7	organ
1957	9	Uttum (D)	Uttum Church		R	I	9	organ
1957 (1997)	10	Veldhausen (D)	Altreformierte Kirche		NB	I (II/P)	6 (13)	
1959/2002	18	Scheveningen (NL)	Zorgvlietkerk		NB	III/P	26	
1961	25	Rysum (D)	Rysum Church		R	I	7	organ
1961	27	Aurich (D)	Lambertikirche		NB	II/P	25	
1962	29	Espel (NL)	Ref. Church		NB	I	7	
1962	30	Bremen (D)	St. Martini		NB	III/P	33	organ
1963	34	Wassenaar (NL)	Kivietkerk		NB	II/P	21	
1965	41	Amsterdam (NL)	Oude Kerk (transept organ)		NB	II/P	17	
1965	43	Amsterdam (NL)	Waalse Kerk		R	II/P	26	
1965	40	Groningen (NL)	Magnaliakerk		NB	II	13	
1965	42	The Hague (NL)	Johanneskapel		NB	II/P	14	
1966	45	Bremen (D)	Protestant Church Oberneuland		NB	II/P	22	
1967	49	Castrop-Rauxel (D)	Johanneskirche Schwerin-Frohlinde		NB	III/P	27	
1968	51	Aalten (NL)	Gereformeerde Zuiderkerk		NB	II/P	16	
1968	58	Haarlem (NL)	Mennonite Church		NB	III/P	24	
1969	62	Hamburg (D)	Reformed Church, Altona		NB	II/P	15	
1966/69/87	65	Marienhafe (D)	Marienkirche		R	II/p	20	organ
1970	68	Frankfurt am Main (D)	Cantate Domino		NB	III/P	33	
1970	69	Uelsen (D)	Reformed Church		NB	II/P	20	
1970/76	70	Innsbruck (A)	Hofkirche		R	II/p	15	organ
1963–71	74	Leer (D)	Große Kirche		R	III/P	37	organ

=== Jürgen Ahrend (1972–2004) ===
year	opus	town	church	picture	kind	manuals	stops	information
1972	76	Eugene	MarAbel B. Frohnmayer Music Building of the University of Oregon		NB	IV/P	38	
1966–73	79	Ochtersum (D)	St. Materniani		R	I/p	9	
1972–75, 1993/94	81	Stade (D)	St. Cosmae et Damiani		R	III/P	42	organ
1974	83	Taizé (F)	Eglise de la Réconciliation (now in Lyon)		NB	III/P	28	
1975	84	Hamburg (D)	Christengemeinschaft Johnsallee		NB	II/P	18	
1975	90	Frankfurt am Main (D)	Evangelische Stadtkirche Höchst		NB	II/P	18	
1975	92	Sloten (NL)	Reformed Church		R	II/p	16	
1977	97	Duderstadt (D)	St. Servatius		NB	III/P	28	
1978	98	Edinburgh (GB)	Reid Concert Hall		NB	II/P	21	
1978	100	Joure (NL)	Reformed Church		NB	III/P	27	
1979	103	Melbourne (AUS)	Monash University		NB	IV/P	45	
1980	104	Leiden (NL)	Hooglandse Kerk		R	II/P	24	
1981	105	Toulouse (F)	Musée des Augustins		NB	III/P	33	
1982/99	107	Lüdingworth (D)	St. Jacobi		R	III/P	35	
1978–83	108	Weener (D)	Weener Church		R	II/P	29	organ
1976/77/83/84	111	Groningen	Martinikerk		R	III/P	52	
1985	115	Porrentruy (CH)	Lycée Cantonale		NB	II/P	30	
1981–85	116	Norden (D)	Ludgeri-Kirche		R	III/P	46	organ
1985	118	Stellichte (D)	Ss. Georg, Christopherus et Jodocus		Rc	II/p	12	
1986	120	Tokyo (Japan)	St. Gregory House		NB	II/p	13	
1986/2007	121/178	Kantens (NL)	Ref. Church		R/Rc	II/p	15	
1986/87	127	Vienna (A)	Michaelerkirche		R	III/P	40	
1987–90	128	Stade (D)	St. Wilhadi		R	III/P	40	
1989	130	Tsukuba (Japan)	Bach-Grove		NB	II/P	19	
1989	131	Wetzlar (D)	Franziskanerkirche		NB	II/P	22	organ
1990	134	Milan (I)	San Simpliciano		NB	III/P	35	
1991	135	Pilsum (D)	Pilsumer Kreuzkirche		R	II/p	16	organ
1991	138	Zwettl (A)	Zwettl Abbey		R	III/P	35	organ
1990–93	139	Hamburg (D)	St. Jacobi		R	IV/P	60	organ
1993	140	Payerne (CH)	Payerne Priory		Rk	II/P	22	
1993/94	143	Trondheim (N)	Nidaros Cathedrale		R	II/P	30	
1994/95	144	Osteel (D)	Warnfried Church		R	II/p	13	organ
1995	145	München (D)	Deutsches Museum		NB	II/P	17	
1997	147	Landshut (D)	St. Jodok		NB	II/P	15	
1997	149	Tokyo (Japan)	Casals Hall, Nihon University		NB	III/P	41	
1997	150	Stuttgart (D)	Musikhochschule Stuttgart		NB	II/P	15	
1998	151	Logabirum (D)	Logabirumer Kirche		NB	I/P	10	
1997/98	153	Dornum (D)	St. Bartholomäus		R	III/P	32	organ
2000	157	Lübeck (D)	Lübeck Cathedral (little organ)		R	I/p	10	
2000	158	Kongsberg (N)	Kongsberg Church		R	III/P	42	organ
2001	159	Trebel (D)	Feldsteinkirche		R	II/P	19	
2002	160	Leer (D)	Lutherkirche		NB	III/P	39	
2002	161	Köln (D)	Ursulinenkirche		NB	II/P	19	
2002/03	162	Wilten (A)	Stift Wilten		R	I/P	4 (10)	
2003/04	163	Altenbruch (D)	St. Nicolai		R	III/P	35	organ
2004	164	Hokksund (N)	Haug, Norway kirke		NB	II/P	22	
2004	165/183	Oldersum (D)	Oldersumer Kirche		NB	II/P	16	

=== Hendrik Ahrend (from 2005) ===
year	opus	town	church	picture	kind	manuals	stops	information
2005	170	Notre Dame/Indiana	University of Notre Dame		NB	I	5	
2005	171	Pernegg (A)	Stift Pernegg		R	II/P	18	
2006	172	Calgary (CA)	University of Calgary		NB	II/P	21	
2007	176	Herzogenaurach (D)	St. Otto		NB	II/P	26	
2007	177	Vaison-la-Romaine (F)	Vaison Cathedral		NB	II/P	20	
2007	178	Kantens (NL)	Antoniuskerk		Rk	II/p	15	
2007	179	Våler, Hedmark (N)	Våler kirkelige fellesråd		R	I	8	
2007/08	180	Leer (D)	Catholic-Apostolic Church		NB	II/P	10	
2009	187	Venice (I)	Chiesa di San Salvador		NB	I	8	
2009	188	Melle (D)	St. Matthäus		R	II/P	23	
2009	189	Königs Wusterhausen (D)	Kreuzkirche		NB	II/P	19	
2010	194	Brixen (I)	Frauenkirche am Kreuzgang		R	I/P		
2010/11	195	Hollern (D)	St. Mauritius		R	II/P	24	
2011/12	199	Worpswede (D)	Zions's Church		NB	II/P	24	organ
2011/12	200	Buttforde (D)	St. Marien		R	I/p	9	organ
2012/13	202	Badia, South Tyrol (I)	St. Jakob und Leonhard, Abtei		NB	III/P	about 35	
2013	203	Sankt Peter (D)	Maria Lindenberg		NB	II/P	17	
2013/14	204	Rinteln (D)	Kloster Möllenbeck		R	II/P	20	
2015	207	Langwarden	St. Laurentius		NB	II/P	21	
2015–16	210	Heidelberg	St. Raphael		N	II/P	32	
2017	213	Tokyo (J)	Concert Hall		NB	II/P	21	
2014–18	206/215	Leer (D)	Große Kirche		R	III/P	48	organ
2018–20	217	Regensburg	Dreieinigkeitskirche		NB	II/P	30	
