= Mixed youth choir Leiden orphanage =

The Mixed youth choir Leiden orphanage was the choir of the Heilige Geest- of Arme Wees- en Kinderhuis ("Heilige Geest Orphanage") in the city of Leiden in the Netherlands between 1796 and 1802. It was the first mixed youth choir in Western Europe.

== Establishment of the choir ==
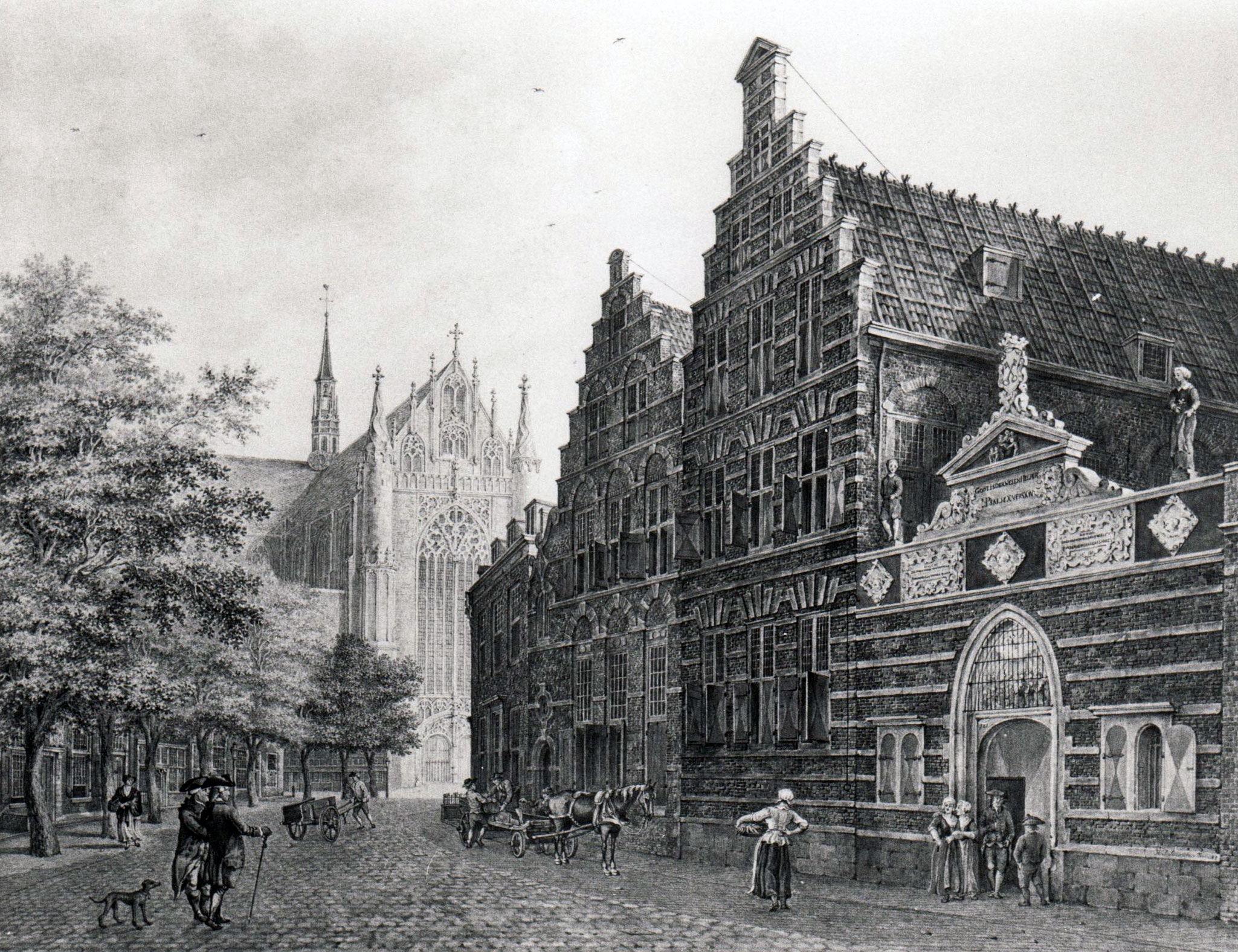
The building of the orphanage on the Hooglandsekerkgracht in the 18th century.

1796, the second year of the Batavian Republic in the Netherlands, saw the start of a remarkable project at the orphanage. The aim of the project was to provide the children of the orphanage with musical education. A choir was to be formed expressly for orphans from the age of 15, boys and girls. The repertoire was to consist of songs of a religious nature though not exclusively Psalms as would normally be the case.

Though it is not clear who was responsible for the establishment of the choir, we do know the name of the singing master in the trial period: J.H.T. Duville. This resident of Leiden was a private music teacher, either from the Southern Netherlands (the present Belgium) or France. He began teaching in January 1796. It is most likely that the establishment of the choir can be linked to the presence from 1795 of the French in the Netherlands. The orphanage’s board of trustees that founded the choir was very much in favour of the French and the ideals of the French Revolution. The progress made in the first few months was so much to the satisfaction of the trustees, that they decided to establish the choir (the ‘Zangcollege’ or ‘Zanginstituut’) officially on 19 April 1796.

== Music director ==
Duville was called away, shortly after the official start of the choir, leaving them in need of a replacement. But fortunately, one was soon found: organist and composer Christian Friedrich Ruppe (1753-1826). At that time, he was director of music at the Leiden University and organist at the Lutheran church in Leiden. He accepted the position and commenced his duties in July 1796.

== Concerts and recession ==
From the time of his arrival the choir was funded by donations and the proceeds of concerts in which it participated. In the course of its existence four concerts were given in the Hooglandse Kerk, one of the two largest reformed churches in Leiden. Ruppe wrote works especially for the occasions, as well as songs written for the education and enjoyment of the children themselves. The first concert was given on the day following Christmas 1796.

From the end of 1797, the choir faced a period of decline, mainly due to the worsening economic situation of the Batavian Republic as a whole and of the institution in particular. In spite of this, the quality and quantity of music written for the choir remained constant. The last concert took place on 27 December 1798. The dissolution of the choir came soon after, in August 1799. The books were closed on 12 January 1802.

== European significance ==
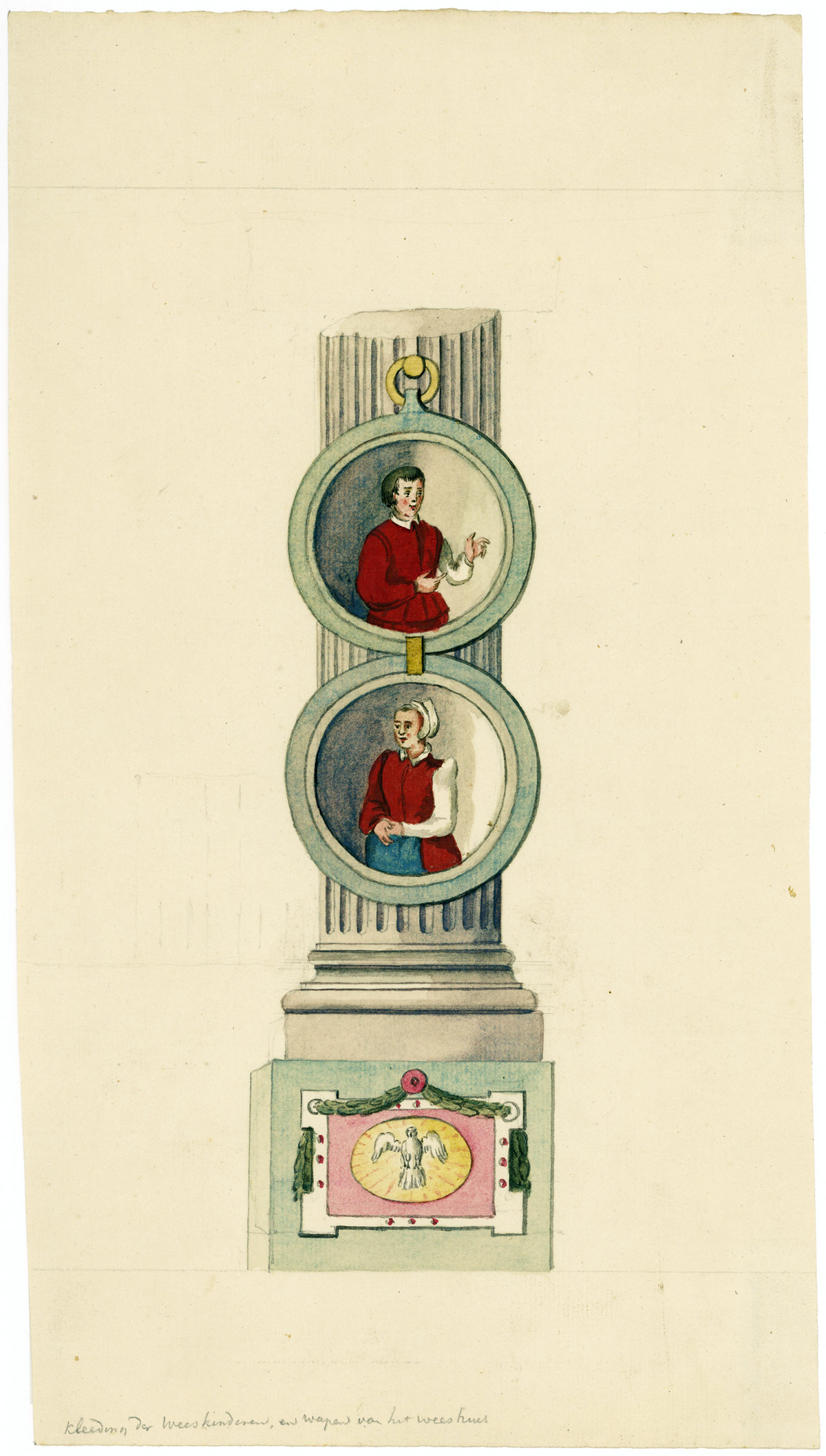
Uniforms of a boy and girl of the Leiden Heilige Geest Orphanage on a column with the orphanage symbol, 18th century.

Despite its short existence, the orphan choir displayed a number of remarkable aspects, some of which can even be called unique: The choir can be considered as the first mixed youth choir in Western Europe. It is also the first instance in the Netherlands of music education being given to children of a lower social class, and in a form that offered a variety of educational experiences; the children were taught to sing in a choir that performed in public and used texts of a religious nature. The trustees also saw participation in the choir as partly a recreational activity, which was quite a remarkable idea in view of the rather austere circumstances of parentless children in Dutch society. The select group of children participating in the choir could also be held up as an example to the rest of the children of the orphanage; those who did not sing in the choir were present at the concerts. The music written for them by Ruppe is an excellent example of Dutch religious music in the Classical Style.

== Resident composer ==
Settings of works by well known poets from around Leiden were included in the orphan choir’s repertoire. Probably the best known of these poets is Hieronymus van Alphen (1746-1803) who by this time had written his famous poems for children, some of which were set by Ruppe and in the years 1822-1830 published.

It is of course very rare for such a choir to have a director who is also its own resident composer. Of the music that Christian Friedrich Ruppe wrote for the choir, only two pieces written for performances have survived: the ‘Kerstmuziek 1796’ (‘Music for Christmas 1796’) and the ‘Muziek voor het Paaschfeest 1797’ (‘Music for Easter 1797’). The manuscript of the ‘Kerstmuziek 1796’ was discovered in 1987 when a new inventory was made of the archives of the Heilige Geest Orphanage. The pieces can be seen in the light of the vocal music from the time of the ‘godsdienstige zanggenootschappen’, so called religious choral societies, which existed in the Netherlands in the years (1790) 1800-1820.

== Religious choral societies 1790-1820 ==
The music manuscripts of the works made for the choral societies of The Hague, Rotterdam, Middelburg and other towns in the Netherlands are believed to be lost. The existing evidence consists of printed pamphlets with the text of the cantatas and newspaper announcements. They rarely contain any evidence of the music, but give some idea of the form and sometimes the scale of the pieces performed.

The manuscripts of the Christmas and Easter music for the Leiden orphan choir are among the few documents preserved from the above-mentioned period that give evidence of this national phenomenon. These choral societies performed cantatas and other varieties of vocal music in the Dutch language. A number of these choirs were established to aid the introduction in 1807 of the new "Evangelische Gezangen", a supplement to the Psalms. Others however had a much more ambitious agenda. These choirs performed, often with orchestral accompaniment on the main Christian holy days. However, the events were not liturgical and open to the general public. Tickets were sold, the proceeds often going to charity. There is evidence that a lecture or sermon was given in combination with the musical performance in many cases. The public activities of the Leiden orphan choir also fit this description.

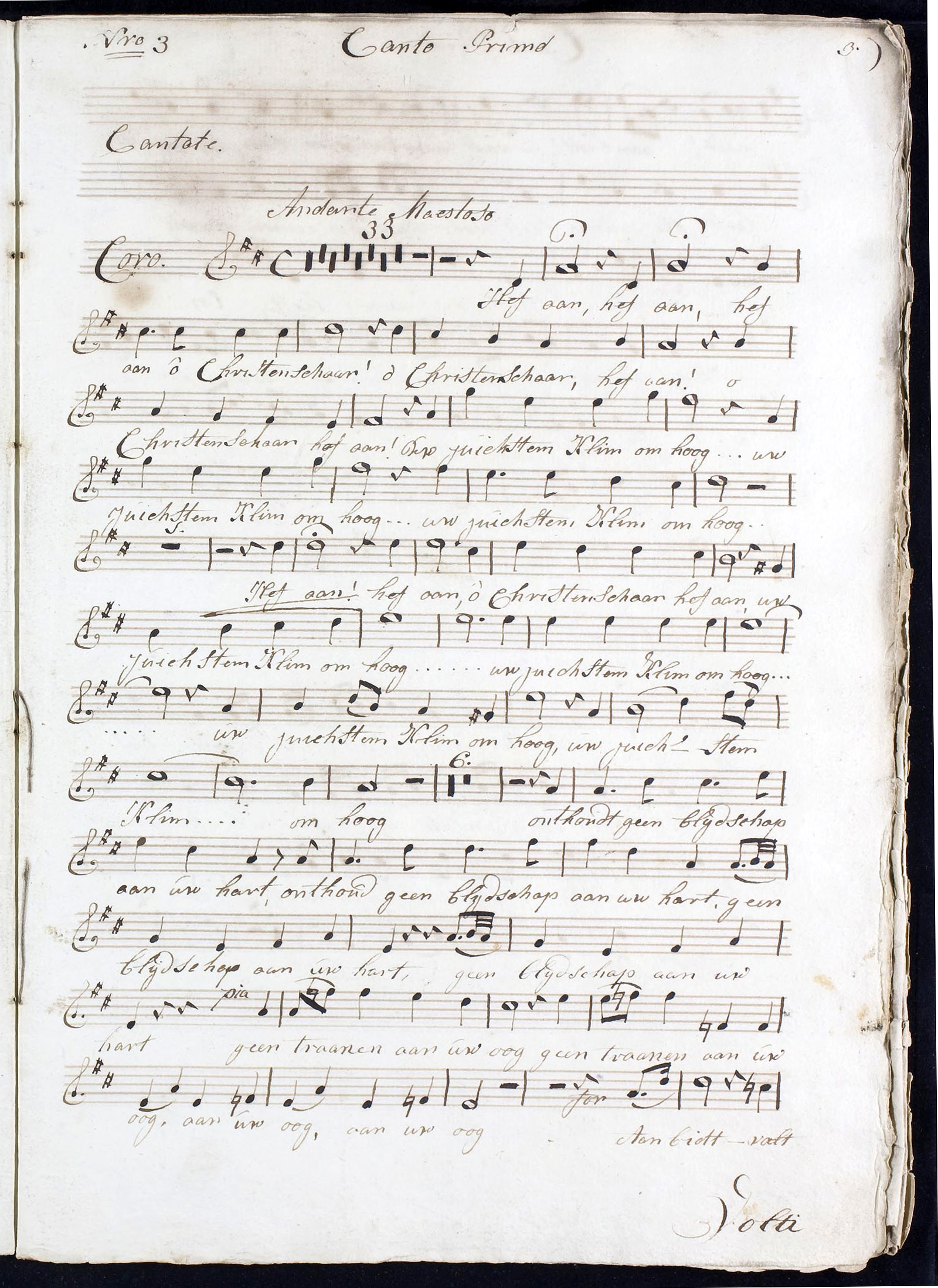
Manuscript of the opening chorus of the Christmas Cantata by Christian Friedrich Ruppe, for the orphan choir debut in December 1796.

Though there is evidence of activity of religious choral societies before 1800, the bulk seems to have occurred from 1800 to 1820. This coincides with an important political development; 1798 saw the ratification (imposed by the French) of a new constitution. One of the most important provisions of this new constitution was the effective separation of church and state. As a consequence, the Dutch reformed church was no longer entirely supported by the state, leaving the churches in the Republic to devise other means of gathering funds for their activities, largely those in support of the poor. A special committee was established particularly for this purpose in 1798. Given the charitable character of the ‘zanggenootschap’ concerts it is very likely that this was one of the ways the church attempted to accrue additional funds. The organizers of these societies were largely members of the clergy or associated with it. That they chose this way of generating funds is quite remarkable given the period with its turmoil and social and economic unrest. It also presupposes a broad interest in religious music of a rather modern nature which given the dominance of the Psalms in the church music in the Netherlands is equally remarkable.

== Debut ==
The first concert, given on 27 December 1796, described as Third Christmas Day was a resounding success despite the cold. About a thousand souls attended the concert including the other children of the orphanage. Before and after the Christmas Cantata (Ruppe had composed adjuncting parts) the former Middelburg pastor Johannes Hendricus van der Palm (1763-1840) had given an instructive sermon. In his sermon, this new Leiden Professor had rhetorically asked those attending if Jesus himself would approve less of hearing music sung by the needy (the ‘behoeftigen’). Instrumentalists from the Leiden university, the refugee stadtholder William V and the Leiden bourgeoisie had supported the singers. In the Hooglandse Kerk, the immense church building in the immediate vicinity of the orphanage, the singing orphans together with the sound of horns, trumpets, violins and kettledrums chosen by composer Christian Ruppe must have surely made a lasting impression. An extensive and enthusiastic review in the Leydse Courant bears witness to this.
