= Holy Spirit Orphanage =

Orphanage in Leiden, the Netherlands

Coordinates: 52°09′32.7″N 4°29′39″E

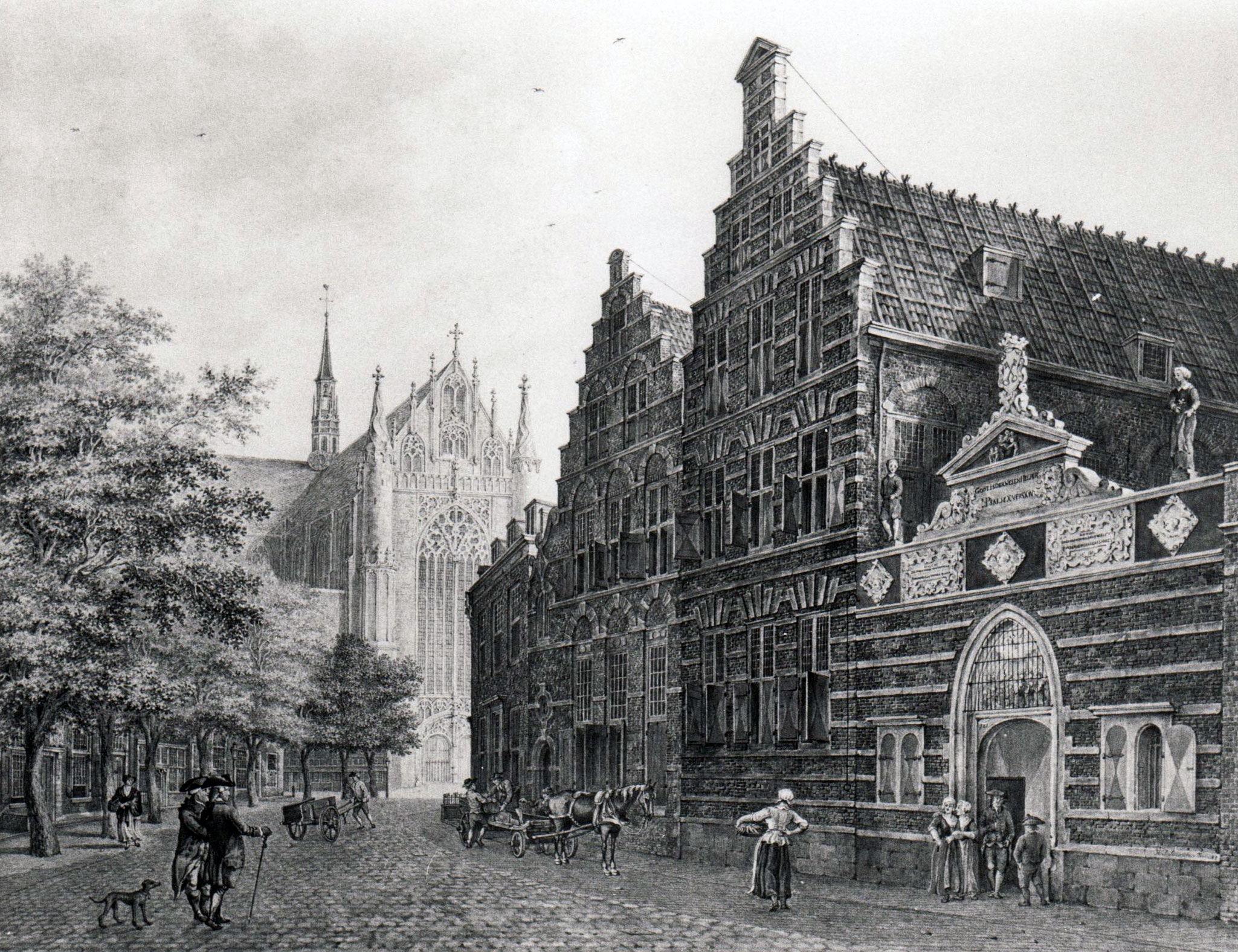
The building of the orphanage on the Hooglandse kerkgracht in the 18th century.

The Holy Spirit Orphanage (Dutch: Heilige Geest- of Arme Wees- en Kinderhuis) was an orphanage in the city of Leiden in the Netherlands. It is a Rijksmonument located on Hooglandse Kerkgracht 17B.

== Origin ==
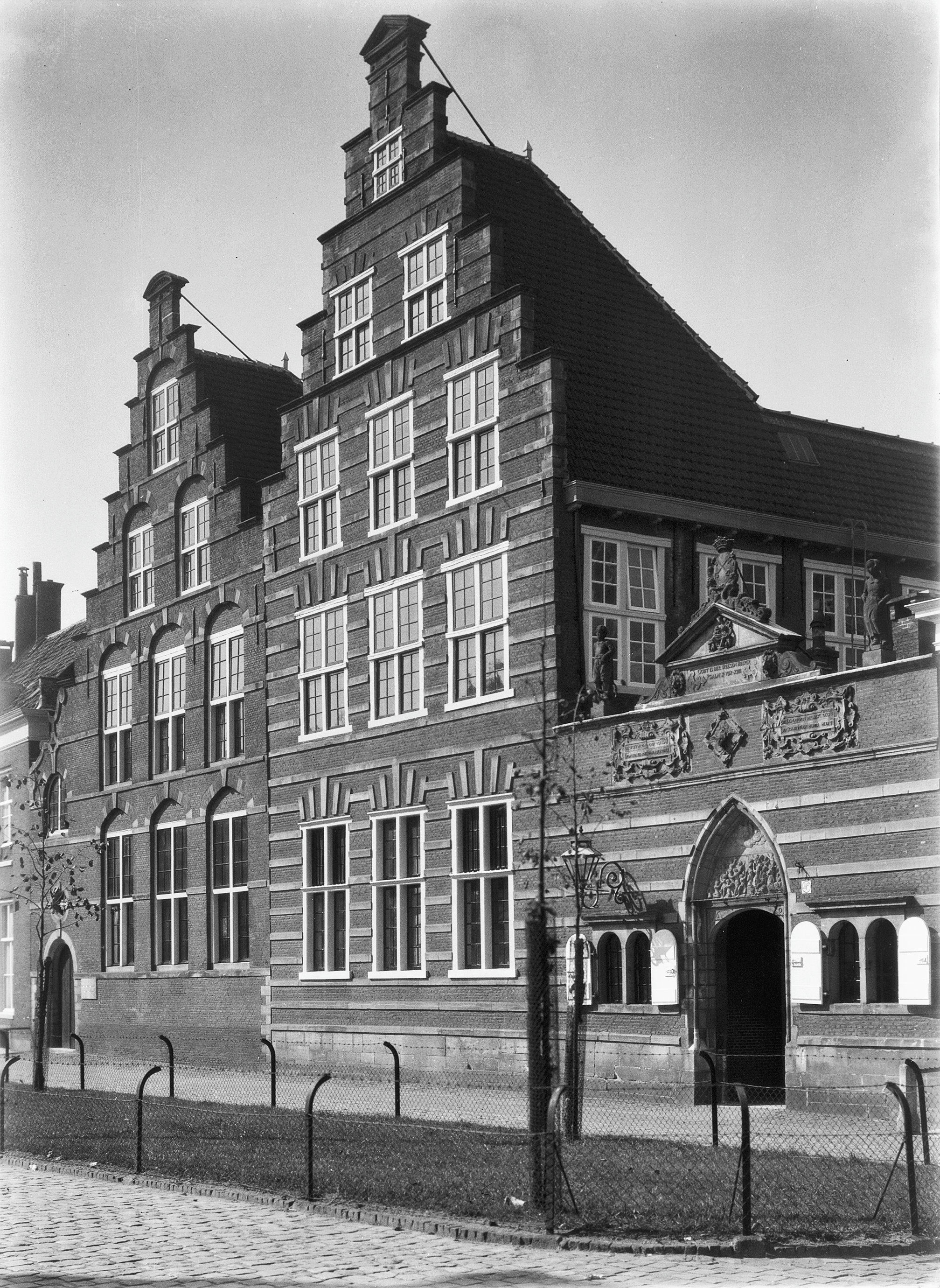
The building of the orphanage in the 20th century.

Heilige Geest ('Holy Ghost' or 'Holy Spirit') was the name of a charitable institution, originating in France, which cared for the poor and needy. In the Dutch city of Leiden, the Heilige Geest was responsible for regular distribution of food, clothing, and small amounts of coin money. It began in Leiden shortly before 1316 with a group of Heilige Geestmeesters ('Masters of the Holy Spirit [Organization]') connected with the Leiden parish of Saint Peter.

== Orphanage ==
Around the year 1450, the institution purchased a former mansion on the Breestraat, opposite the street currently known as the Papengracht. Initially, the building served as an office and warehouse. In 1491, the building was repurposed and became a home for needy and parentless children. This marked the establishment of the Heilige Geest- of Arme Weeshuis.

Soon thereafter, the number of children housed in the orphanage exceeded capacity, forcing the Heilige Geestmeesters to look for a larger building. A new accommodation was found in 1583 in the building of the Vrouwengasthuis ('Woman's Hospital') on the Hooglandsekerkgracht. The Holy Ghost Orphanage remained at this location for almost four centuries.

The building complex would undergo three major renovations in this period. The most important of these took place between 1774 and 1778. The merging of the nearby Arme Kinderhuis ('Poor Children's Home') with the Heilige Geest Orphanage necessitated this renovation. The names of the respective institutions were also joined in the unwieldy designation Heilige Geest- of Arme Wees en Kinderhuis. It was by this name that the orphanage was known well into the twentieth century.

== Present day ==
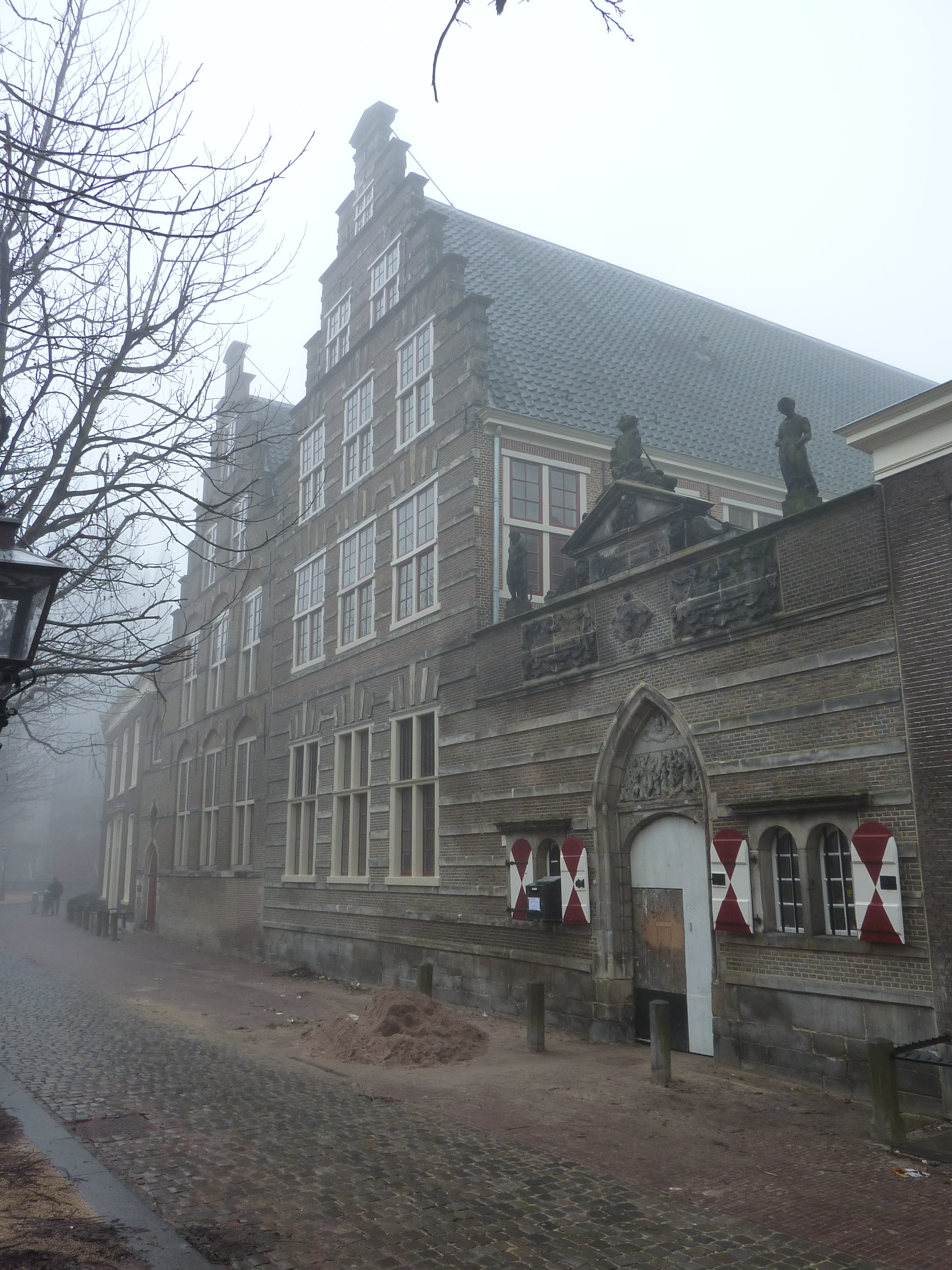
Weeshuis, present appearance

The Holy Ghost Orphanage remained on the Hooglandsekerkgracht until 1961, still carrying out its mission to care for Leiden's poor and needy children. The institution became a foundation in 1979 now known as Stichting Heilige Geest- of Arme Wees- en Kinderhuis te Leiden, caring for the poor and destitute youth in a wider sense. In 1968, the building became a Rijksmonument, a Dutch national heritage site.

At the end of the twentieth century, to further promote the study of its history, the foundation commissioned a new inventory of the archives of the Holy Ghost Orphanage, which dates back to the fourteenth century, as well as a study of the building history and the realization of the score of the Music for Christmas 1796 composed by Christian Friedrich Ruppe for the mixed youth choir of the orphanage.
