= Rysum organ =

Organ (instrument)

Coordinates: 53°22′46″N 7°02′08″E

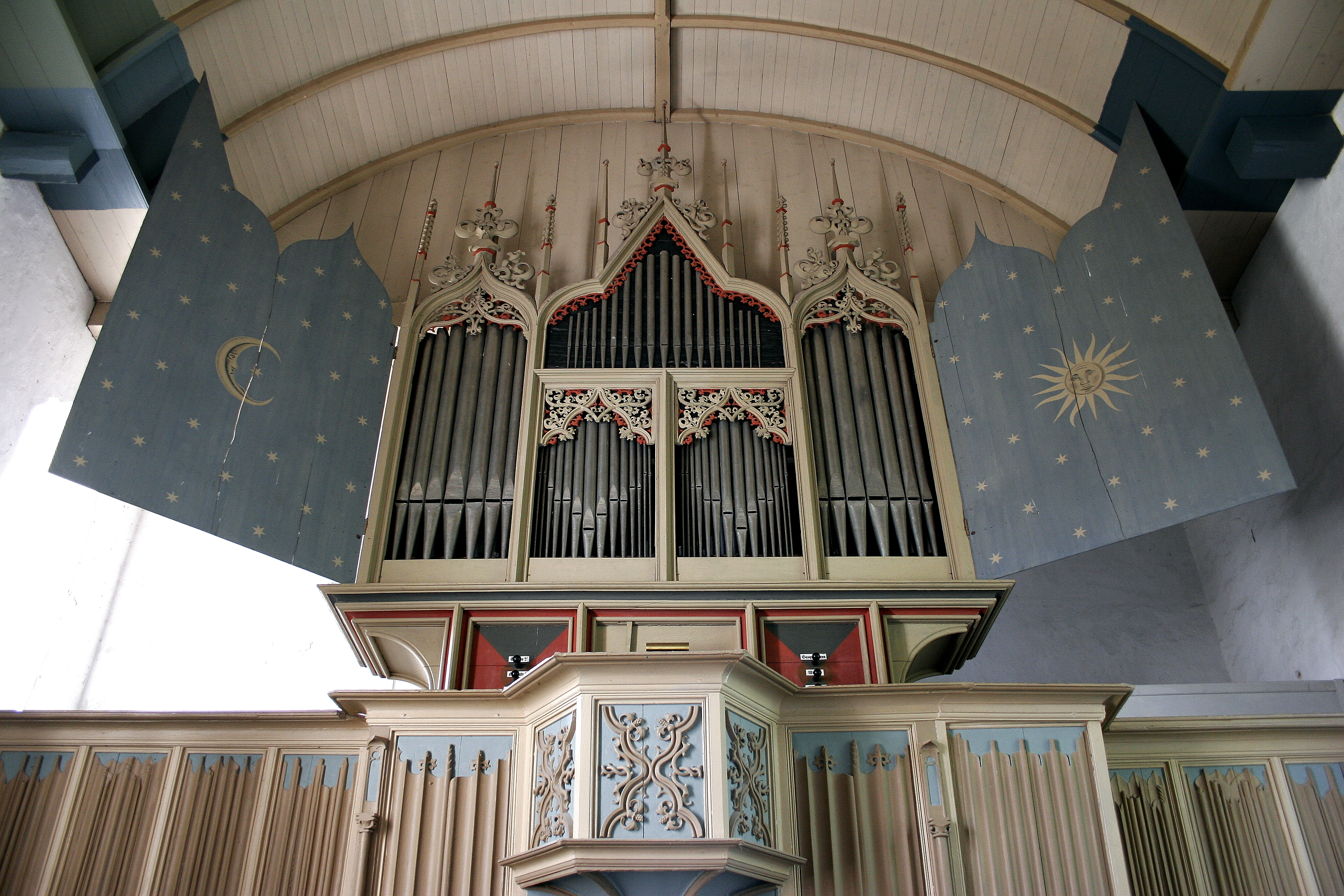
The organ in Rysum

The Rysum organ in Rysum Church in Rysum, north Germany, is the oldest instrument of its kind in northern Europe that still largely has its original pipes. It is also one of the oldest playable church organs in the world alongside those in Sion, St. Valentin in Kiedrich, and Ostönnen. The exact date of its construction is not entirely known, but dates of 1457 and 1440 have been proposed. It was rebuilt in 1513. After undergoing several other modifications through the years it was restored to its 1513 condition by Jürgen Ahrend and Gerhard Brunzema in 1959. The organ has seven stops on one manual.

== History ==
=== Original construction (around 1440 to 1457) ===
An organ was probably built in Rysum in the middle of the 15th century by the master builder Harmannus of Groningen, who is also connected with the Martinikerk in Groningen in 1440. According to the Emder manuscript of the chronicler Eggerik Beninga the farmers of Rysum paid their best ten cows for the organ's construction. A written permit was required before the animals could be transported across the Ems river:

In dusser tyt hebben de pastoer und karckszwaren to Rysum dorch eine schrifft van olde Imell, to Oesterhuusen und Grymersum hoeftlingk, begeret, datt he ohne wulde voergunnen, datt se ere vette beeste aver de Eemse na Gröninghen muchten laten schepen, darmede se ere schulde muchten betalen to Gröningen, wegen des örgels, datt se daer hadden maken laten

In this time, the pastor and elders of Rysum wrote a letter begging permission of Old Imell, chief of Osterhusen and Grimersum, that he might allow them to ship their fattened cows across the Ems to Groningen, to pay their debt to Groningen for the organ they had caused to be built.

— Eggerik Beninga, Chonica der Fresen, vol. 2, page 882

The date of the entry in Beninga's chronicle has been taken as 1457 because it falls between other events dated to 1457 and 1458. The entry itself, however, is vague, and van Lengen has argued that there may be other reasons for its position in the chronicle. Old Immel died in 1456; from the middle of the 1430s he was outlawed, only regaining his position of chieftain from count Ulrich I in 1450. Thereafter he lived peaceably in his estate and his permission would not have been necessary for a crossing of the Ems. Only between 1441 and the beginning of 1445 was he a pirate, together with the chief Brunger II of Rysum, making the Ems unsafe; this period is therefore the likely date for the letter from the Rysum church, and the date of the organ approximately 1440. Further details of the organ's origins remain unknown. The lead for the pipes probably came from the Harz.

Originally the instrument stood on a rood-screen in the choir. In the late Middle Ages, there was no need for an organ, as it had no role in the liturgy, and was not used for accompaniment of congregational singing until the 17th century. Instead, the organ had a symbolic role for the leading representatives of the agricultural community who had funded it, embodying an atmosphere of intense piety but also growing self-confidence of the congregation vis a vis the clergy. It is unknown exactly when the organ was moved to a west-end gallery.

The late-gothic instrument was apparently divided in two parts, having a treble Blockwerk, with a chromatic compass from B to f^{2}, and a bass whose pipes remain, with their original scaling, in the organ's facade. This bass had its own windchest, and could probably be played by a separate keyboard, which in the late-gothic period would usually be a pedal-board. In the treble, it would be possible to play only the Prestant (diapason) visible in the facade, or the entire organ including all the ranks, of assorted scales, in the "Hintersatz". The compass of two and a half octaves suggests an early date of constructions, as four octaves became normal from the 17th century.

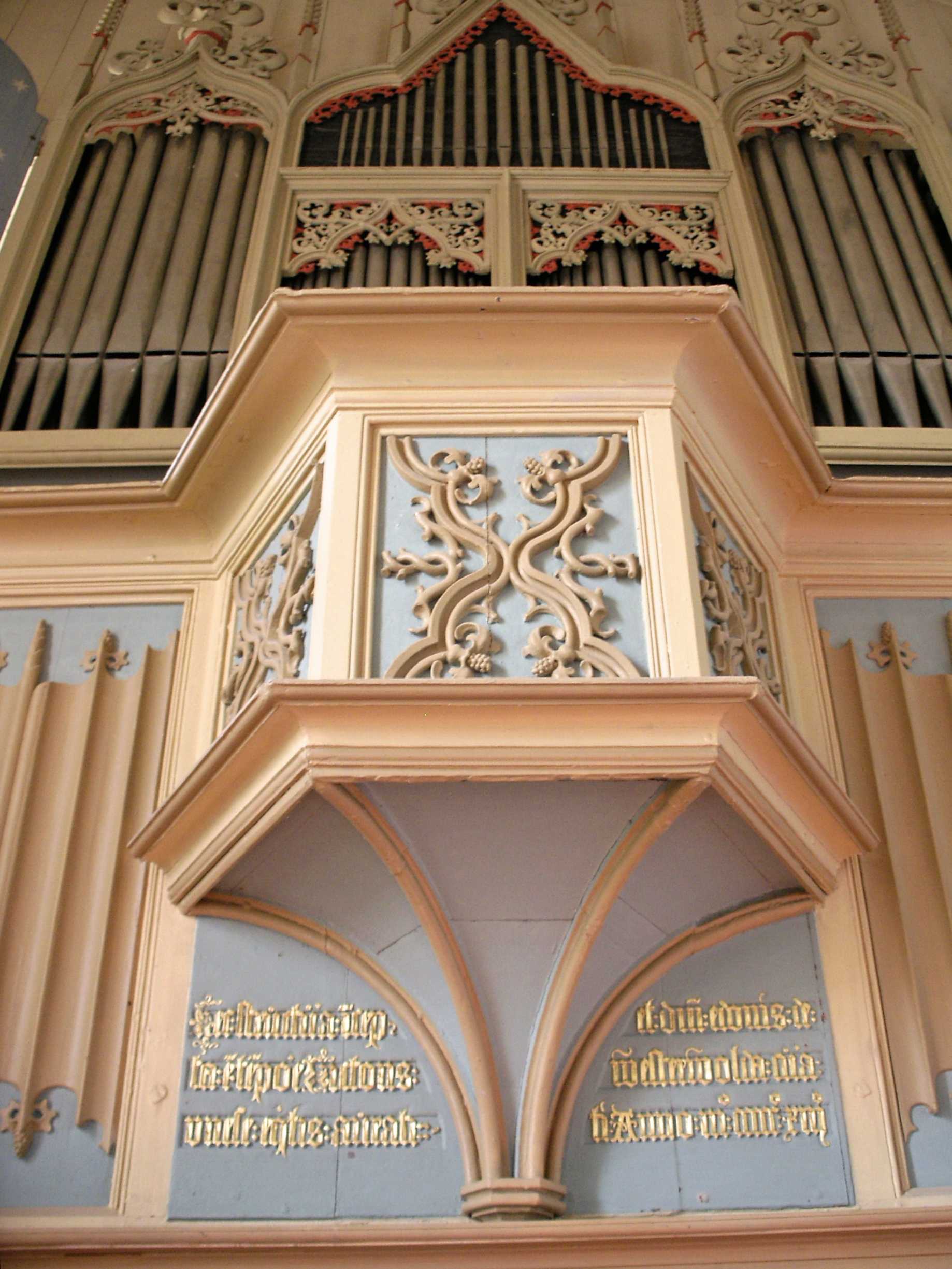
The small balcony and its inscription

In 1513 a small balcony was added to the gallery to accommodate the organist, inscribed with the date. The organ may have been rebuilt at this time. The surviving parts of the wing-shaped doors of the organ case are made of oak, identified by dendrochronology as having been felled in the Baltic in 1480, and may have been fitted to the case during this rebuild. The case bears a Latin inscription commemorating the chieftain and lord of Rysum, Campen and Loquard, Victor Frese (died 1527) and Edo Eissink, pastor of Rysum from 1513 to 1554.

Hec structura incepta est tempore Victoris Vrese equitis aurati et domini Edonis de Westerwolda curati. Anno m ccccc xiii.

This construction was inaugurated during the time of the golden knight Victor Vrese and Herr Edo of Westerwold, Priest, in the year 1513.

— Inscription on the organist's balcony

=== Repairs and rebuilding ===
Repairs were carried out by Joachim Kayser in 1680, and by Valentin Ulrich Grotian between 1689 and 1699. By the end of the 17th century, and possibly as early as 1513, the organ underwent conversion from a Blockwerk in which pipes of all ranks sounded together, to an instrument with a slider-chest, permitting individual ranks to be selected by the organist, a requirement for the accompaniment of congregational singing. The ranks must have been separately-selectable by the time of Kayser, who was paid for seven turned stop-knobs. A further rebuild was carried out between 1736 and 1738 by Matthias Amoor, who was possibly a student of Arp Schnitger. Amoor used part of the winged doors of the organ as a cover for the case, as well as for bellows. During this work, Jacob Tÿlman replaced the gothic, double winged doors with baroque carvings. The instrument was painted, and Amoor increased its compass to CDEFGA-g^{2}a^{2}, a short-octave compass now starting at bottom C instead of B). He also added a pull-down pedal attached to the bass keys of the keyboard. He converted some older pipes into a Gedackt stop. It is unknown whether he made further changes in the organ's disposition, changes that were lost in later rebuilds, or whether the original seven stops remained until 1941. The basic collection of pipes remained, however, preserved from major changes, possibly through lack of funds to do otherwise.

Dirk Lohman was responsible for the care of the organ from 1764 to 1786. Johann Gottfried Rohlfs carried out repairs in 1790/1791. Further repairs were carried out in 1792/1793 by Johann Friedrich Wenthin, whose son Joachim Wenthin was responsible for the organ's maintenance until 1812. There is evidence of further repair by Wilhelm Caspar Joseph Höffgen in 1819/1820. The instrument was maintained by Abbe Oltmanns between 1829 and 1844. The organ-building firm of Gerd Sieben Janssen took over maintenance of the organ between 1848 and 1910. During this time, the case was shortened in 1867/1868, to accommodate a new ceiling in the church. Johann Diepenbrock was probably responsible for replacing they keyboard and stop-knobs in 1880/1890. Between 1910 and 1920 P. Furtwängler & Hammer were responsible for maintenance of the organ, during which time they assessed the organ as irreparable:

Die Orgel ist sehr alt und vollständig verbraucht. Irgend eine Verbesserung durch eine Reparatur ist ausgeschlossen. Wie lange das Werk noch zu benutzen ist, ist nicht bestimmt anzugeben, da das hohe Alter derselben einen plötzlichen Zusammenbruch herbeiführen kann.

The organ is very old, and totally worn-out. Any form of improvement through repair is impossible. It is impossible to say exactly how long the instrument will remain useable, because its extreme age could lead to sudden failure.

— Quotation document from Furtwängler & Hammer, 19th January 1915

Furtwängler & Hammer were not alone; Friedrich Klassmeier came to a similar conclusion in his assessment of 6 January 1915, although the church architect K. Mohrmann in a report dated 12 September 1913 called for the restoration of the original facade, which the reduced ceiling-height had "mutilated in a manner nearly barbaric". Fortunately, the organ was spared demolition, and passed into the care of Max Maucher until 1939, and thereafter Karl Puchar until 1952.

=== Restoration ===
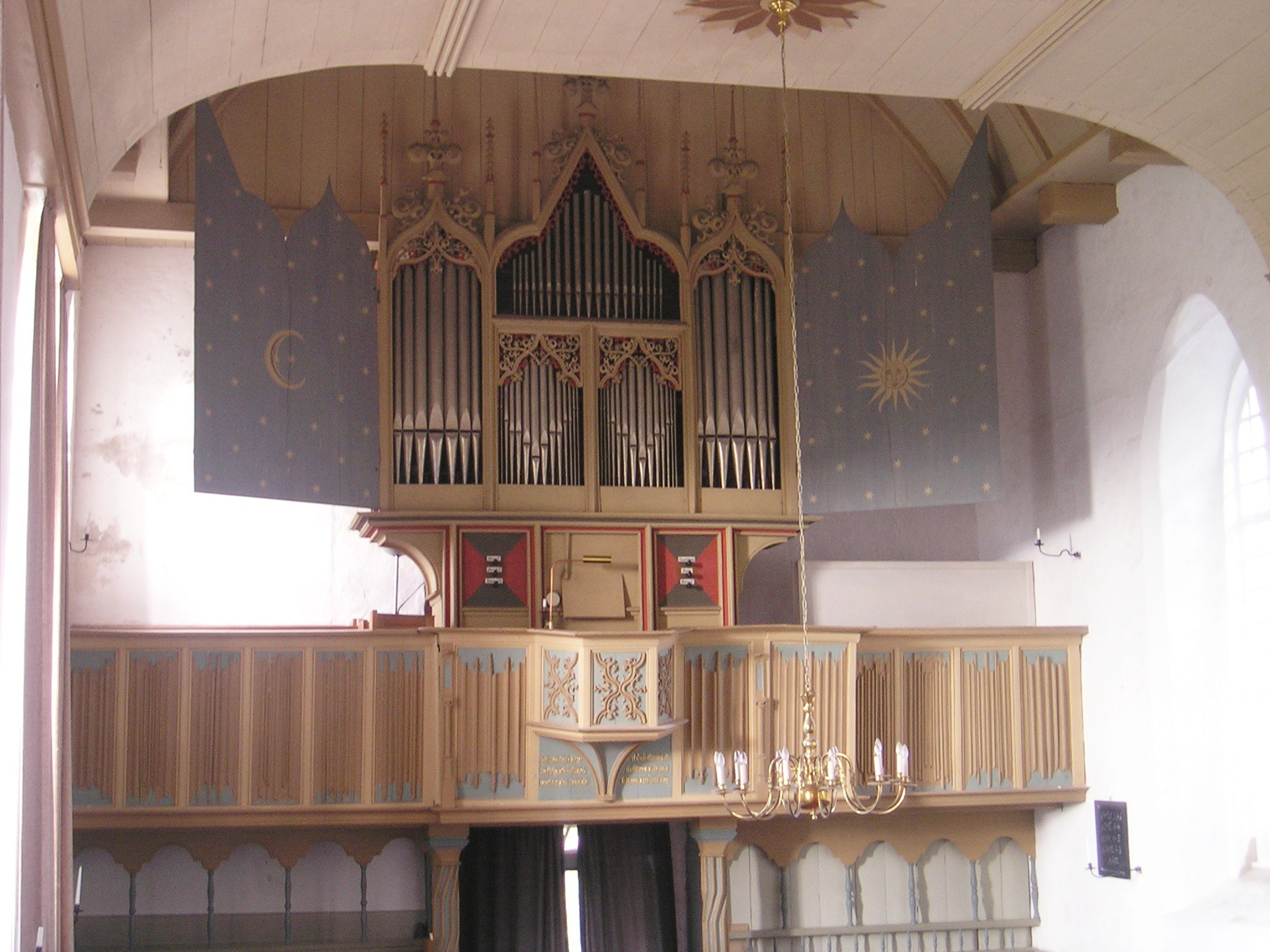
The restored organ in 2006, prior to the renovation of the church

In 1941, Karl Puchar of Norden carried out restoration work on the organ in a manner that would not now be regarded as good practice. He replaced three ranks of pipes with factory-made pipes. He renewed the pedalboard and added the missing notes, C#, D#, F# and G# in the bass octave of the manual keyboard. In the following years the state of the organ deteriorated noticeably; various assessments were therefore carried out between 1947 and 1954.

In 1959/1960 a thorough reconstruction was carried out by Jürgen Ahrend and Gerhard Friedrich Brunzema, who also restored the case, returning its original gothic-arched flats of pipework. Cornelius H. Edskes was the consultant. Ahrend rebuilt the sesquialtera, mixture and trumpet from hammered lead, and returned the instrument to mean-tone temperament with pure thirds. Part of the lowered ceiling was removed, to allow the late-gothic facade to be uncovered. The uppermost pipe-flat, with wooden dummy-pipes, was replaced by Grummer, who also replaced other missing carvings of gothic finials, pinnacles and crockets. The large, winged doors of the organ, which had been removed in the 18th century, were replaced based on the fragments that remained, and the largely-mutilated finish of the case was restored. The various baroque decorations had already been lost, probably during previous maintenance of the church. The pedalboard, which had been added later, was removed, and the manual keyboard, action, wind-chest, and cuneiform bellows were reconstructed in original form. Finally, the instrument was restored to historical paintwork.

During an extensive restoration of the church between 1996 and 2009, the 19th century ceiling was removed; with the exception of the barrel vault over the organ, this restored the building to a single, unified mediaeval beam roof. The organ was cleaned by Hendrik Ahrend, who re-silvered the facade pipes in tin. Winfried Dahlke of the Organeum museum of keyboard instruments, in Weener, carried out documentation of the original pipe inscriptions, proving that the original compass was from B to f.

== Description ==
The organ in Rysum is one of the oldest in the world. While other organs certainly contain older materials, the painstakingly reconstructed gothic facade in Rysum is without parallel. The basic foundation of four registers of pipes made of thick, hammered lead has survived the centuries largely undamaged. These pipes have a very intense, dark tone. The facade pipes have pointed labia typical of gothic pipework. Only the lowest bass pipes have been modified, lengthened during the modernisation of the gothic Hintersatz, or Blockwerk. The deepest pipes weigh approximately 25 kg. The current technical layout of the wind-chests and action, together with the greater compass, reflect the organ's state during the Renaissance. The conversion of this organ from blockwerk to a slider-chest is made more plausible by the presence of a (reconstructed) lever turning the Prästant (diapason) on and off. The winged doors, decorated with sun, moon and stars, and based on remnants of the originals, can be closed completely.

The flat facade has the proportions of the golden section, and is decorated with gothic carvings. The richly-profiled lower casework is divided into three fields, the outer two each containing three stop-knobs. The stylised hour-glasses on the lower casework behind the stop-knobs are symbolic of man's fleeting existence, while the stars on the winged doors represent heaven. The lead pipes of the facade are silvered with highly polished tin. The outer two pipe-flats, each of seven pipes, are shaped in late-gothic ogees. The right-hand side contains a dummy pipe to preserve visual symmetry. The two inner pipe-flats, each of fourteen pipes, are rectangular, and are surmounted by a decorative panel of dummy pipes above, in an ogee arch. It is possible that fifteen pipes from the two octave registers, which are constructed differently to the main Prästant, might once have filled this space, as sounding pipes.

== Stop List ==
Manual CDEFGA-g^{2}a^{2}
Praestant	8′ (Note: Facade.)
Gedackt	8′
Octave	4′
Octave	2′
Sesquialtera II	(Note: Reconstructed by Ahrend & Brunzema.)
Mixtur III-IV
Trompete	8′

All stops not made by Ahrend are gothic originals.

- Meantone tuning slightly above a^{1}=440 Hz
- Slider chest
- Wedge bellows providing a pressure of 70 mm of water

Annotations
