= Rysum =

- Village of Krummhörn
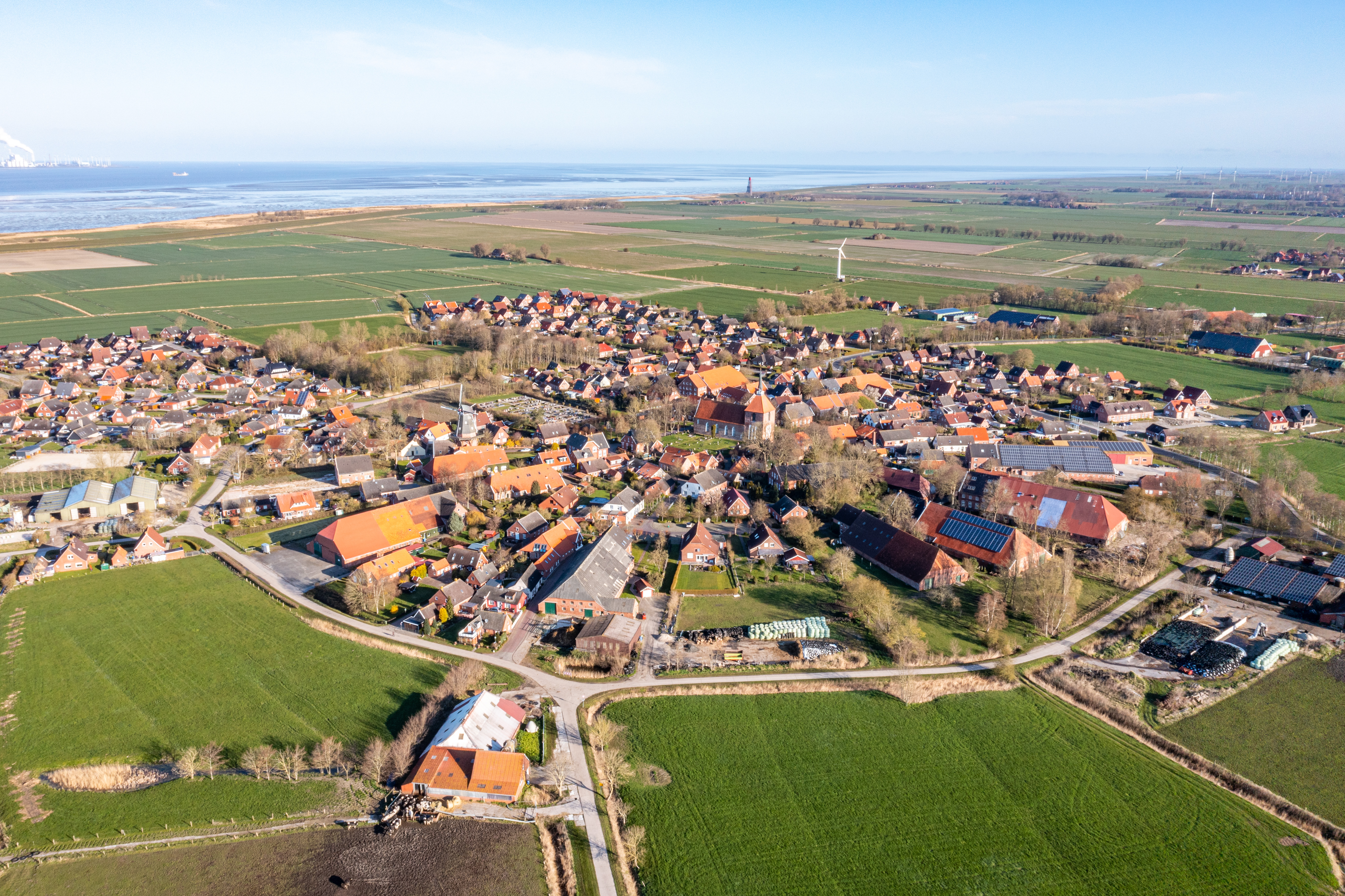
- Aerial view of Rysum

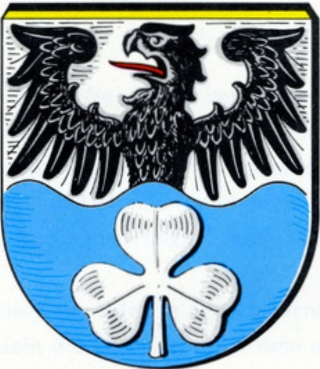
- Coat of arms
- Interactive map of Rysum
- Location within Germany Location within Lower Saxony
- Country: Germany
- State: Lower Saxony
- District: Aurich
- Municipality: Krummhörn

Area
  - Metro: 10.06 km^{2} (3.88 sq mi)
- Elevation: 4 m (13 ft)

Population
  - Metro: 689
- Time zone: UTC+01:00 (CET)
  - Summer (DST): UTC+02:00 (CEST)
- Postal codes: 26736
- Dialling codes: 04927

Rysum is a village located 15 kilometers west of Emden in the region of East Frisia, in Lower Saxony, Germany. It is part of the municipality of Krummhörn. The village is home to the Rysum organ, one of the earliest pipe organs in playable condition.

The village, built on a warft, was first mentioned in the 10th century. The Evangelical Reformed Church of Rysum dates from the 15th century.

== Gallery ==
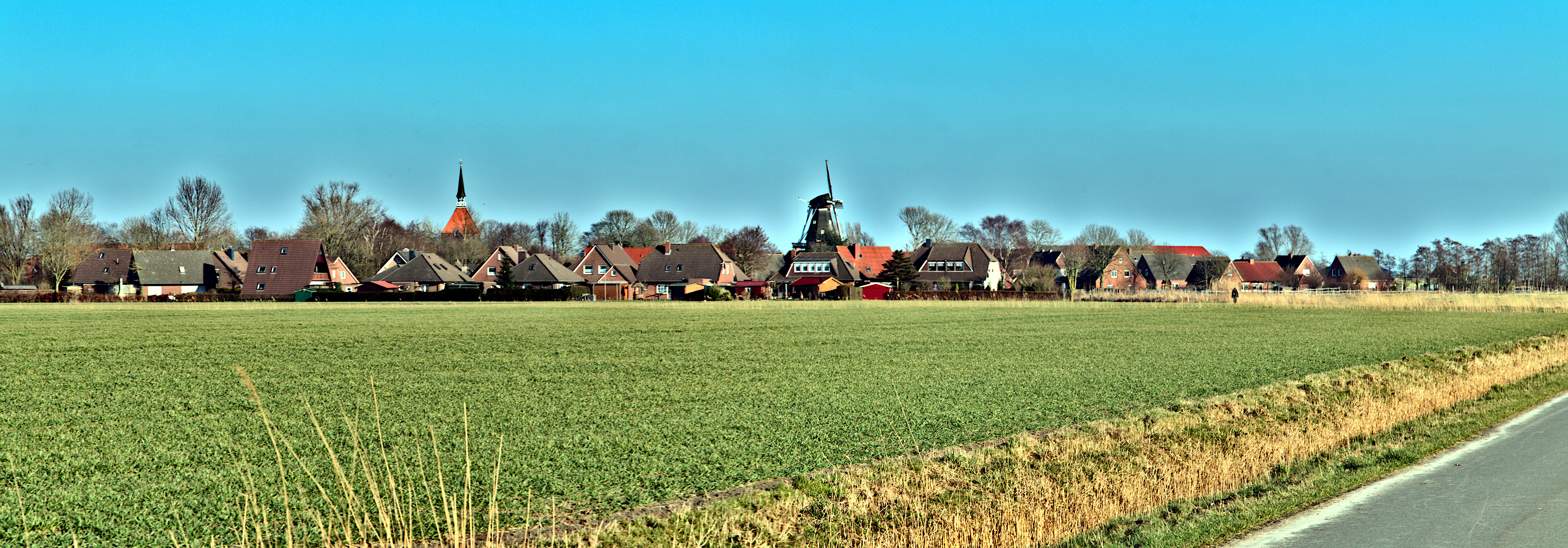
View of Rysum

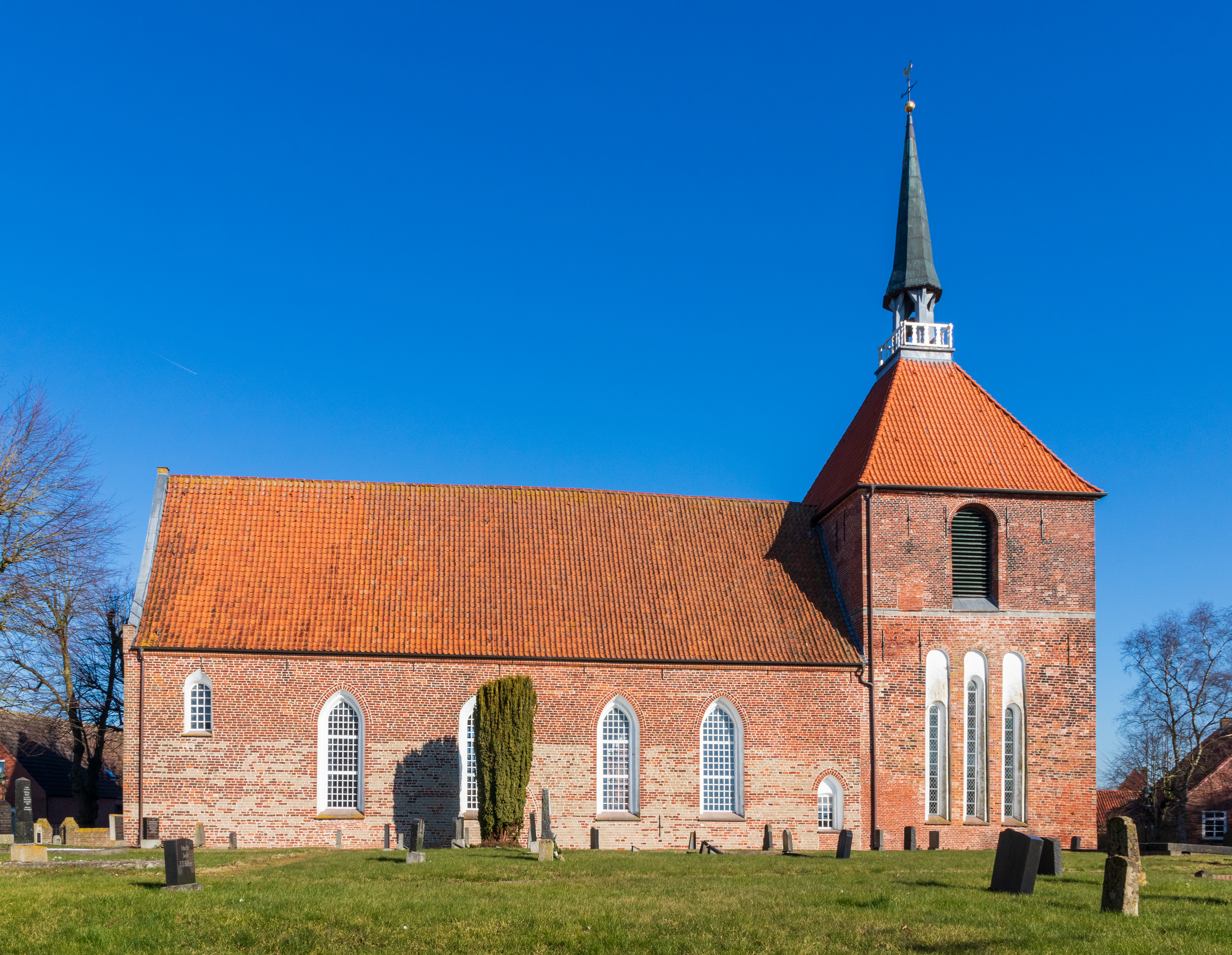
Church of Rysum

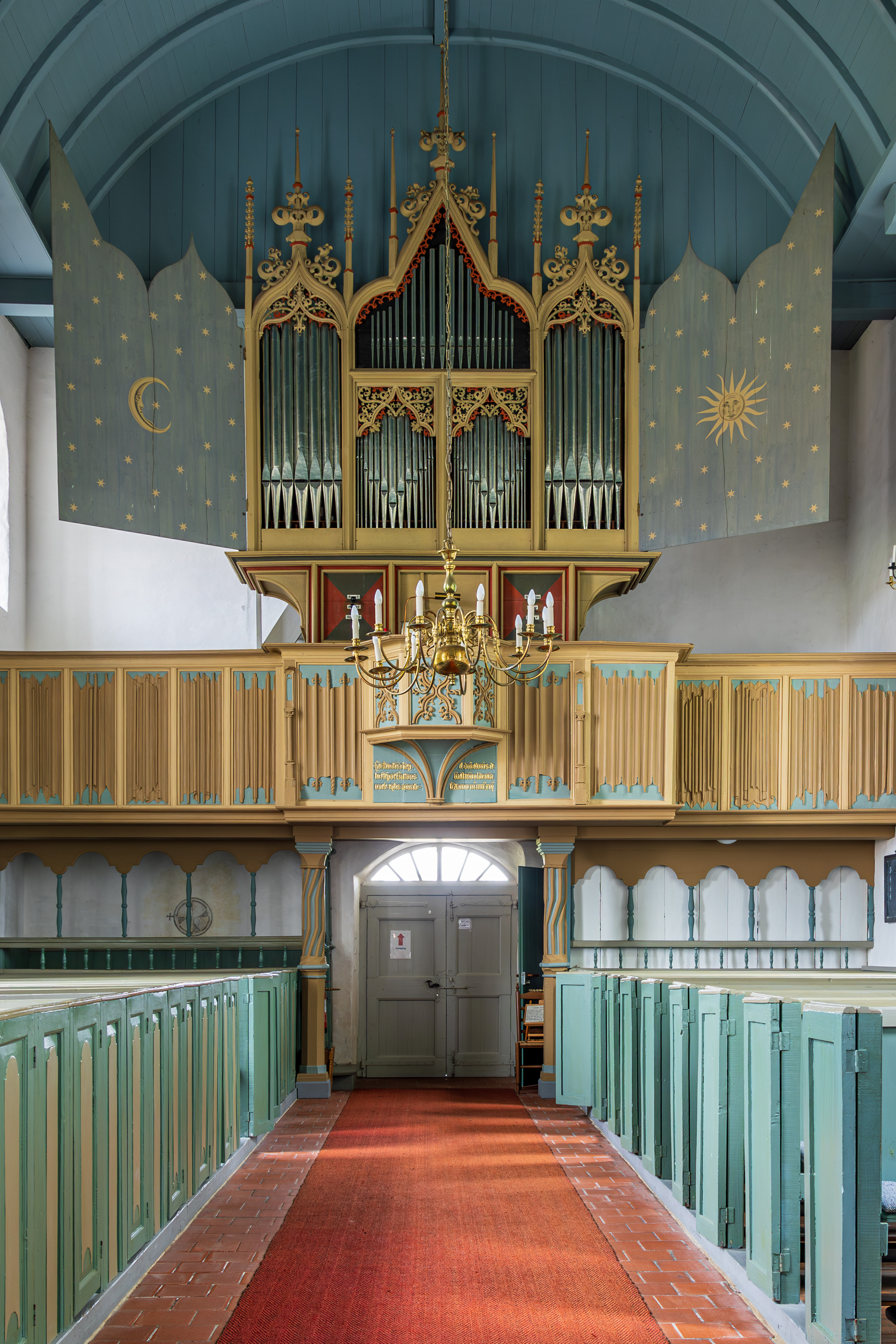
Rysum organ

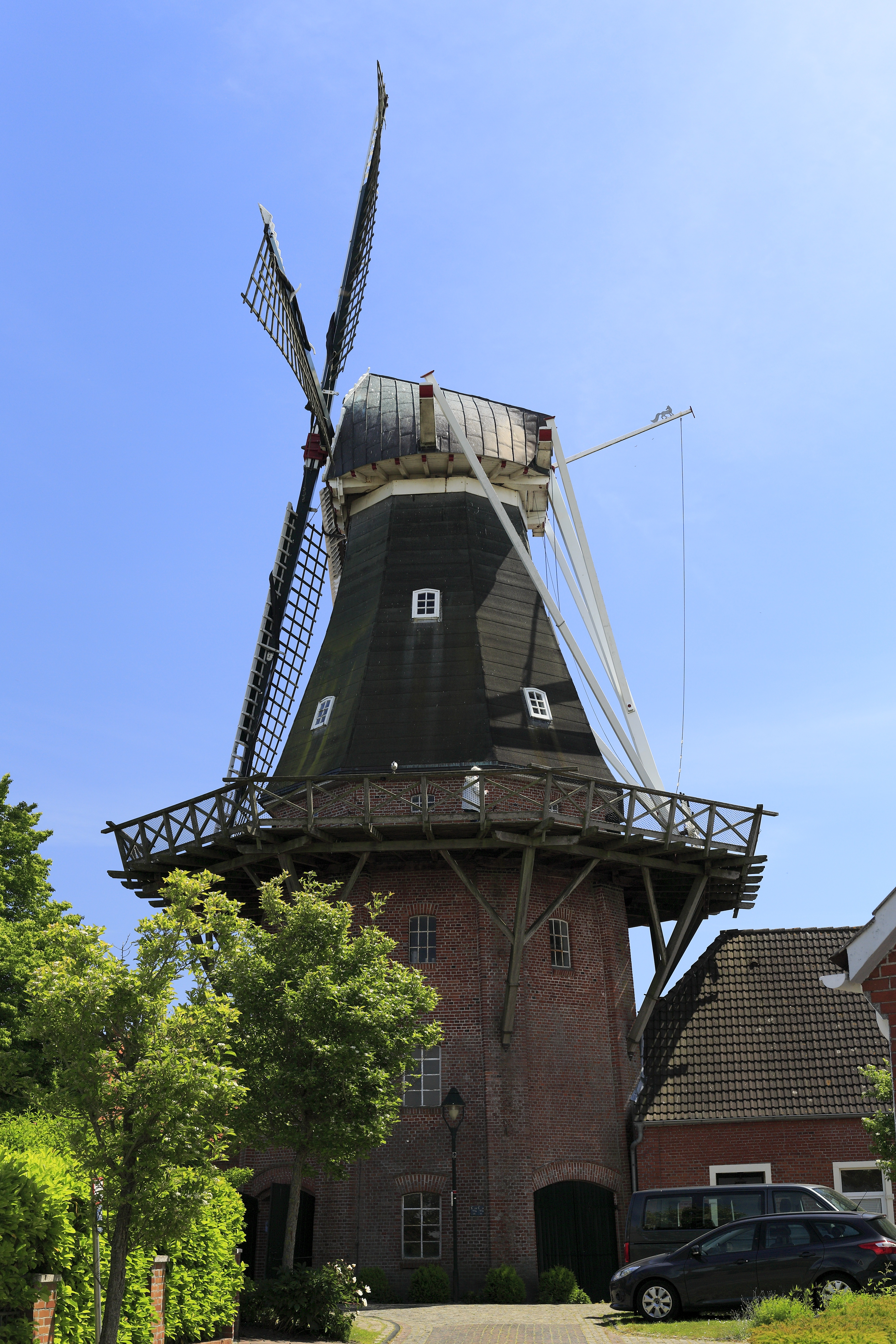
Windmill in Rysum
