= Hooglandse Kerk =

Church building in the Netherlands

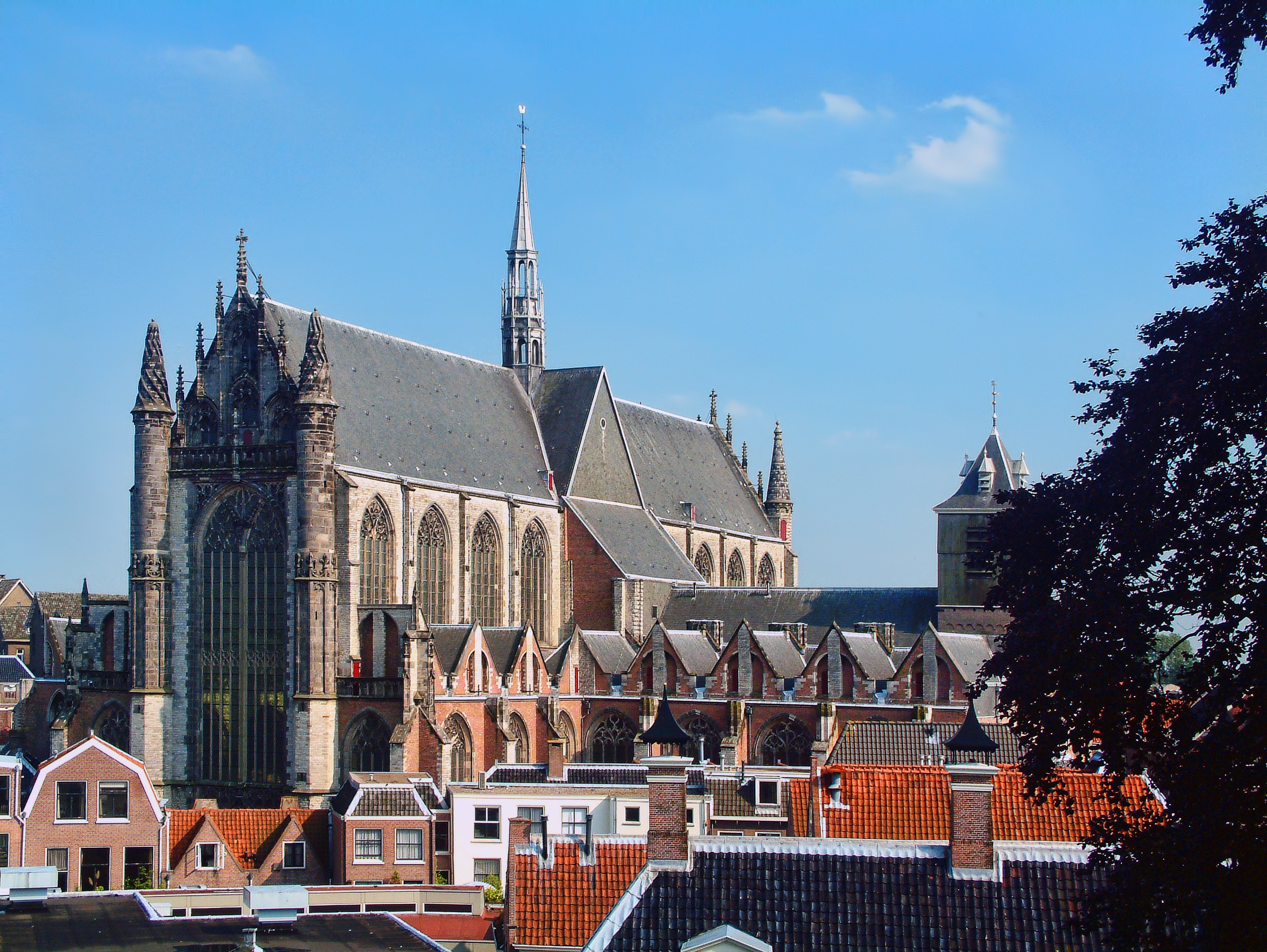

Location
- Location: Leiden, Netherlands
- Interactive map of Hooglandse Kerk
- Coordinates: 52°9′29″N 4°29′39″E

Architecture
- Style: Gothic architecture

Specifications
- Length: 70,7 meters
- Width: 65,7 meters

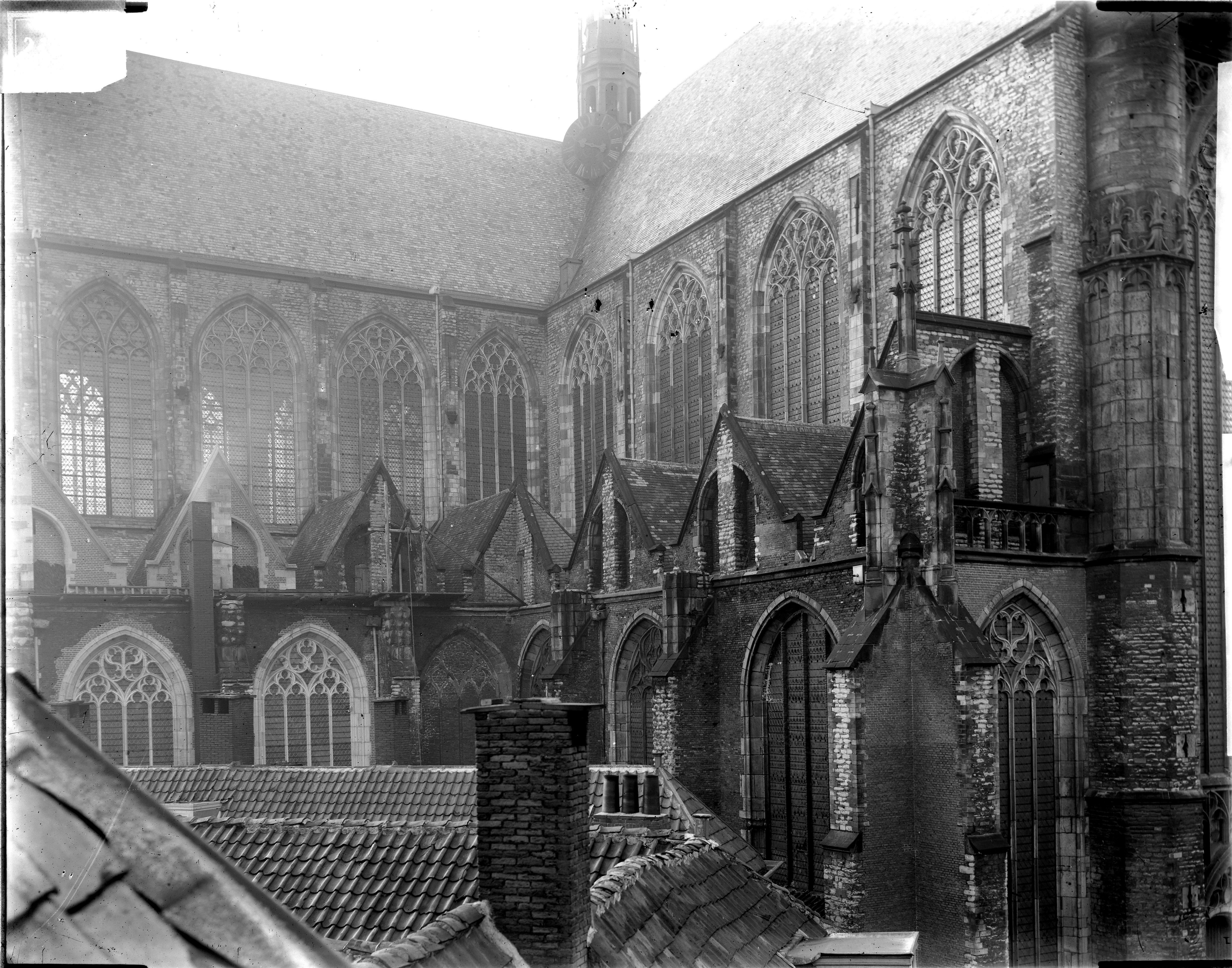
Hooglandse Kerk around 1900 (picture by Jan Goedeljee)

The Hooglandse Kerk is a Gothic church in Leiden. Its earliest parts date back to the last quarter of the fourteenth century. Most of the current structure dates from the fifteenth century. The brick church was dedicated to St. Pancras and today serves parishioners of the Protestant Church in the Netherlands.

== History ==
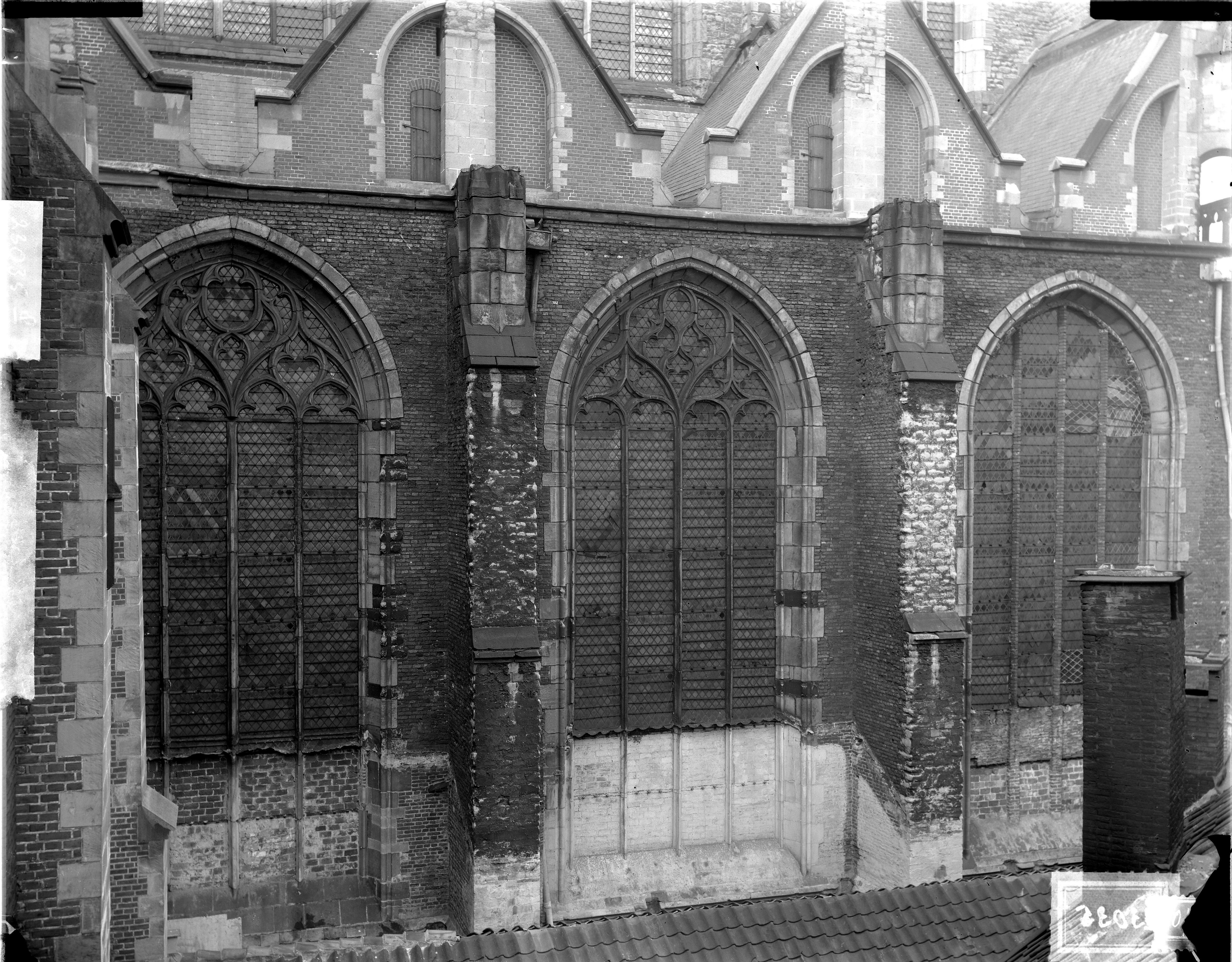
Hooglandse Kerk around 1900 (picture by Jan Goedeljee)

Essays written to commemorate the 700th jubilee of de Hooglandse or Saint Pancras church give an overview of history of church, based on a review of the literature, archival research, and dendrological investigations of the wooden roof. It is summarized below.

=== Wooden chapel and simple brick church ===
The history of the Hooglandse Kerk began when the bishop of Utrecht, Gwijde of Avesnes, granted permission on 20 December 1314 for the construction of a wooden chapel on the 'Hooge Land' (High Land) as an annex of the parish church of Leiderdorp. The chapel was dedicated to Saint Pancratius (b. c. 300) and consecrated in September 1315. On October 29, 1366, the bishop of Utrecht, John of Virneburg, raised the church to a chapter church. The canons that belonged to the collegiate chapter of Saint Pancras were predominantly derived from ancient families and mostly of nobility. Construction of a simple stone church to replace the wooden chapel started in 1377. The roof of the nave of this new church, built in the already then somewhat archaic romano-gothic style, was completed shortly after 1392 and the construction project was completed in the last years of the 14th century. Parts of the tower of the 14th-century church are still in evidence in the current church.

=== Unfinished Gothic church ===
On the advocacy of Charles the Bold, Pope Paul II granted the chapter of Saint Pancras' exemption on February 24, 1470. As a result, the chapter no longer fell under the jurisdiction of the diocese of Utrecht, but under the direct authority of the pope. The increasing stature of the St Pancras church and urban growth of Leiden gave rise to the idea of building a great cross church, which must surpass the Pieterskerk in all respects. Construction of the new church in the Gothic style began around 1470 and dendrological evidence indicates that the roof of the ambulatory was completed shortly after 1472, with that of the transepts and the choir by the end of the 15th century. The transept is the longest gothic transept in the Netherlands with a length of 65.70 meters. Construction of the nave was considered in the early years of the 16th century. Plans were developed and construction started but the project was abandoned by mid century. The extension and elevation of the nave, the stone vaults, air bows and balustrades were not completed, leaving the church with a nave that is much lower than the transept and the choir. The church was elaborately decorated in the 16th century with 24 altars, stained glass windows, and frescos. An altar dedicated to its patron Saint Pancras had a prominent place in the church.

=== Cathedral ===
Around 1525 it was discussed to elevate the St. Pancras church to cathedral status. Leiden would become a bishop's seat and the collegiate chapter would be elevated to a cathedral chapter. However, at the episcopal reorganization of 1559, the intended bishop's seat eventually fell to the Grote or Sint-Bavokerk in Haarlem.

=== Reformation and the Dutch Revolt ===
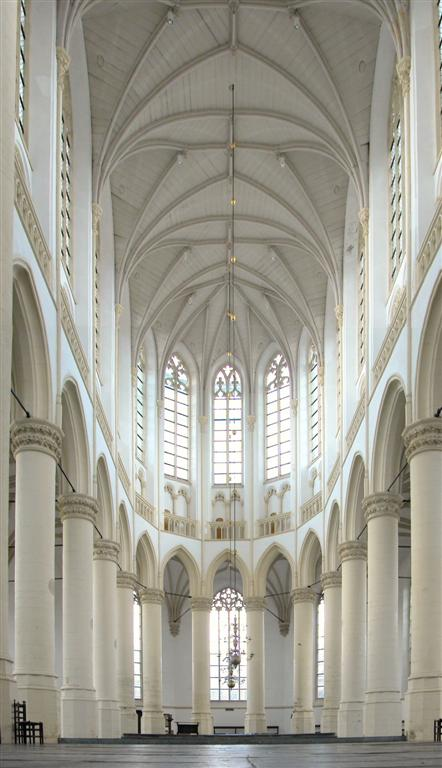
Interior of the Hooglandse Kerk

Two related but different developments influenced the physical appearance and the governance of the St. Pancras church in the 16th and 17th centuries. The rise of especially the Calvinist reformation in the Netherlands and the Dutch revolt against Spain (1568–1648). The tension around the rise of the Protestant Reformation gave rise to two days of robbery and plunder of all churches in Leiden, including the St. Pancras. During the iconoclasm of August 1566 numerous religious artifacts and archives were looted or destroyed. A second wave of religiously inspired violence, this time extending beyond looting and including violence against persons, occurred in 1572. This second wave of violence occurred shortly after Leiden City council had declared itself for the revolt against Philip II, after starting discussions with the leader of the revolt, William of Orange, as early as 1570. Troops under Lumey and loyal to the revolt had entered the city in June 1572 and participated in the second wave of violence.

From 1572 the churches in Leiden were controlled by the City Council and made available by them to the Nederduits Gereformeerde Kerk (Dutch Reformed Church). The St Pancras became known as the Hooglandse Kerk and saw its first Protestant service in July 1574 in a much-changed interior: White-washed walls, plain transparent glass, seats for the congregation and no statuary or altars. The original three parishes of the Pieterkerk, the St Pancras church, and the Vrouwenkerk were subsumed in the Dutch Reformed Congregation of Leiden and used as needed, which included grain storage during Leiden's siege in 1574 and quartering of troops in 1618 at the height of the dispute between followers of Armenius and Gomaris.

The ground-level look of the Hooglandse Kerk changed with the construction of three small houses against the church's west wall in 1591–93 and a further two against the Sacristy in 1649, and five more against the north wall in 1650. The church's caretaker lived in one of these houses and the rest were rented out, with the proceeds allocated to the operations and maintenance of the church.

=== 17th century – present ===
in 1665, the Hooglandse Kerk received a new west portal, executed in a mix of classical and gothic elements. Seventeenth-century representations of the church indicate that its exterior is by-and-large the same as it is in the early 21st century: A tall gothic choir and transept, a much lower nave, and a relatively short bell tower, the top part of which is clad with wood. The number of small houses built against the church waxed and waned over time and with the taste and political will of the times. By the early part of the 19th century, the church is almost completely ringed by these small houses, some of which have been subsequently demolished and others renovated.

Much of the 19th- and 20th-century history of the Hooglandse Kerk focuses on renovations after the building had been damaged by a major explosion nearby in 1807 and insufficient upkeep of the centuries-old building. A renovation campaign was started in 1839 and continued off and on until 1979 when the church was officially reopened. The early days of the renovation were under the guidance of architects J.C. Rijk and W.C. Mulder. Part of the work was on the vault of the nave (1840) and the beautiful wooden vaults in the choir and the transept (1850) that give a good impression of the original spatial effect. During this period, the choir gate was removed from the high choir. A. Mondt jr. was responsible for the project starting from 1920 till the start of the Second World War and Architect Piet van der Sterre took on the project from 1947 to 1978 and the project was brought to conclusion by Ab Peetoom.

The Hooglandse Kerk continues to hold church services; the Ecumenical Leiden Students Ekklesia worship there every Sunday. It is also the venue of conferences, concerts and other events.

== References and sources ==
=== Sources ===
Elias van der Plicht and Paul de Tombe (editors). De Kathedraal van het licht. Zeven eeuwen Hooglandse Kerk. College van Kerkmeesters van de Prodestantse gemeente te Leiden 2015
