= Larrelt =

- District of Emden
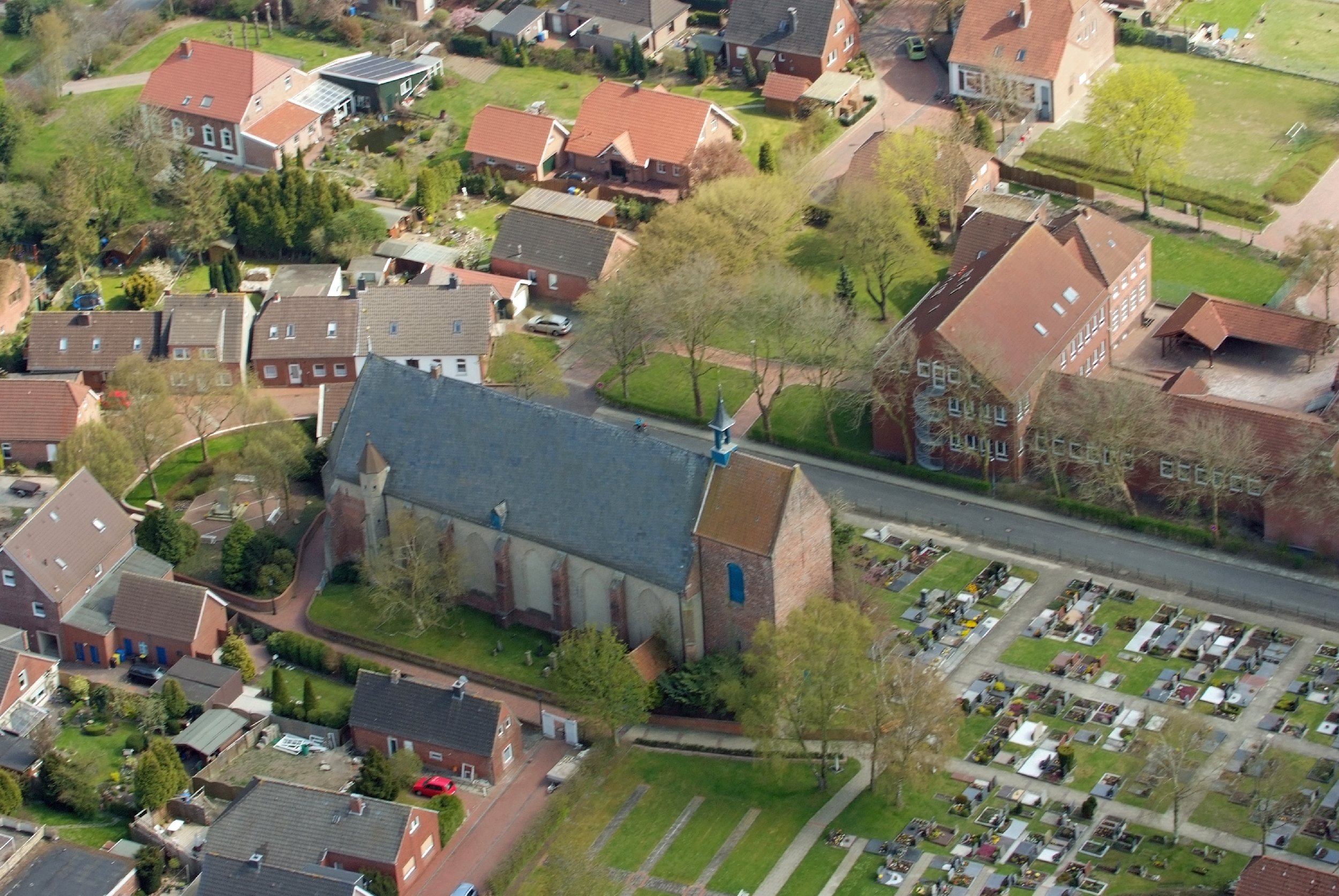
- Aerial view of Larrelt

- Location of Larrelt within Emden
- Interactive map of Larrelt
- Location within Germany Location within Lower Saxony
- Coordinates: 53.36525°N 7.15667°E
- Country: Germany
- State: Lower Saxony
- City: Emden
- Elevation: 1 m (3.3 ft)

Population
  - Metro: 2,601
- Time zone: UTC+01:00 (CET)
  - Summer (DST): UTC+02:00 (CEST)
- Dialling codes: 04921
- Vehicle registration: 26723

Larrelt is a former village in Lower Saxony, Germany. The centuries-old East Frisian village originally belonged to the former Landkreis Norden, but was added to the city of Emden as a district (Stadtteil) immediately after the Second World War. It currently lies directly to the north of the Emden industrial estate.

The oldest mention of Larrelt, as Hlarfliata, dates from the 10th century. The former village has a church which dates from the 15th century.

== Gallery ==
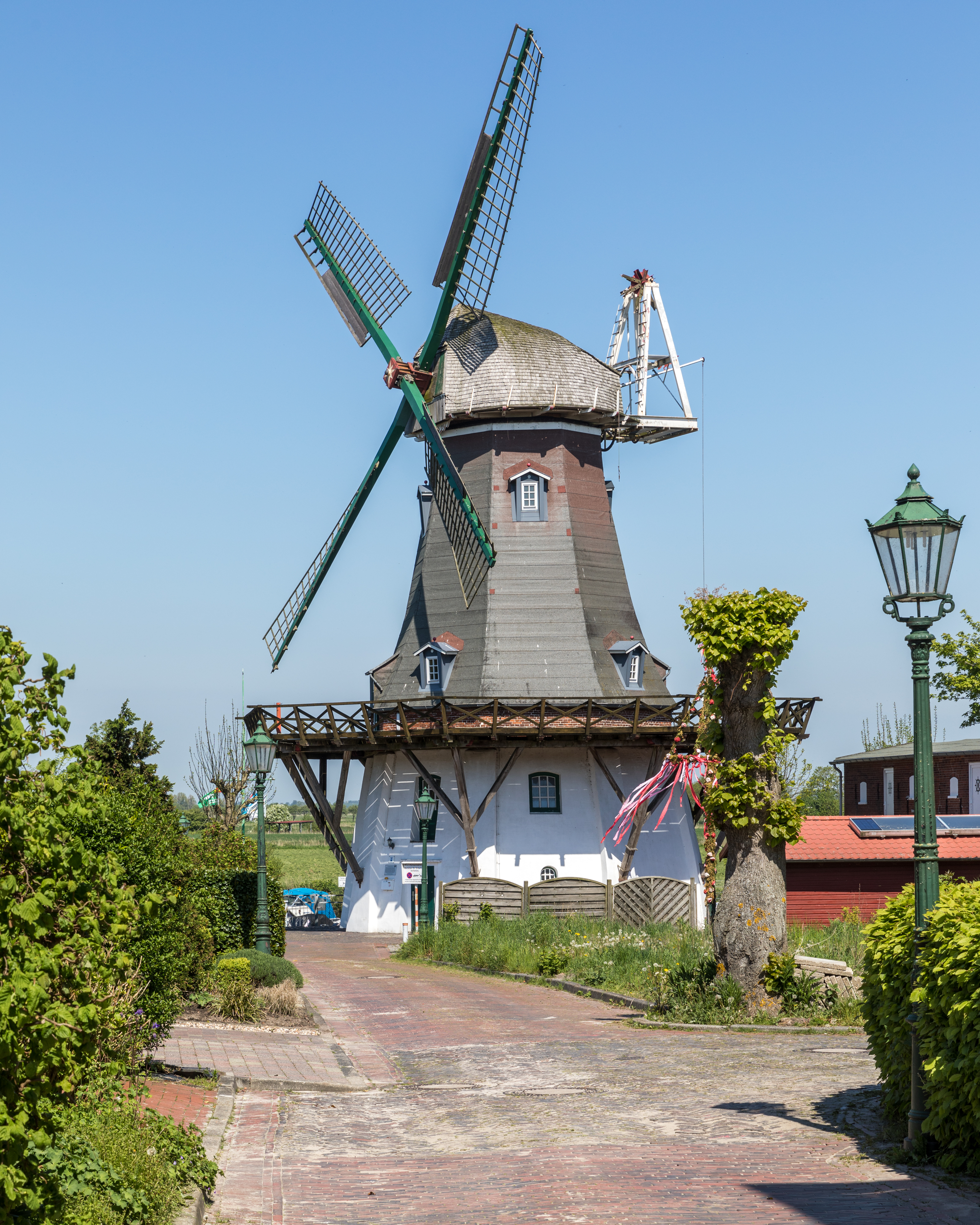
Windmill in Larrelt

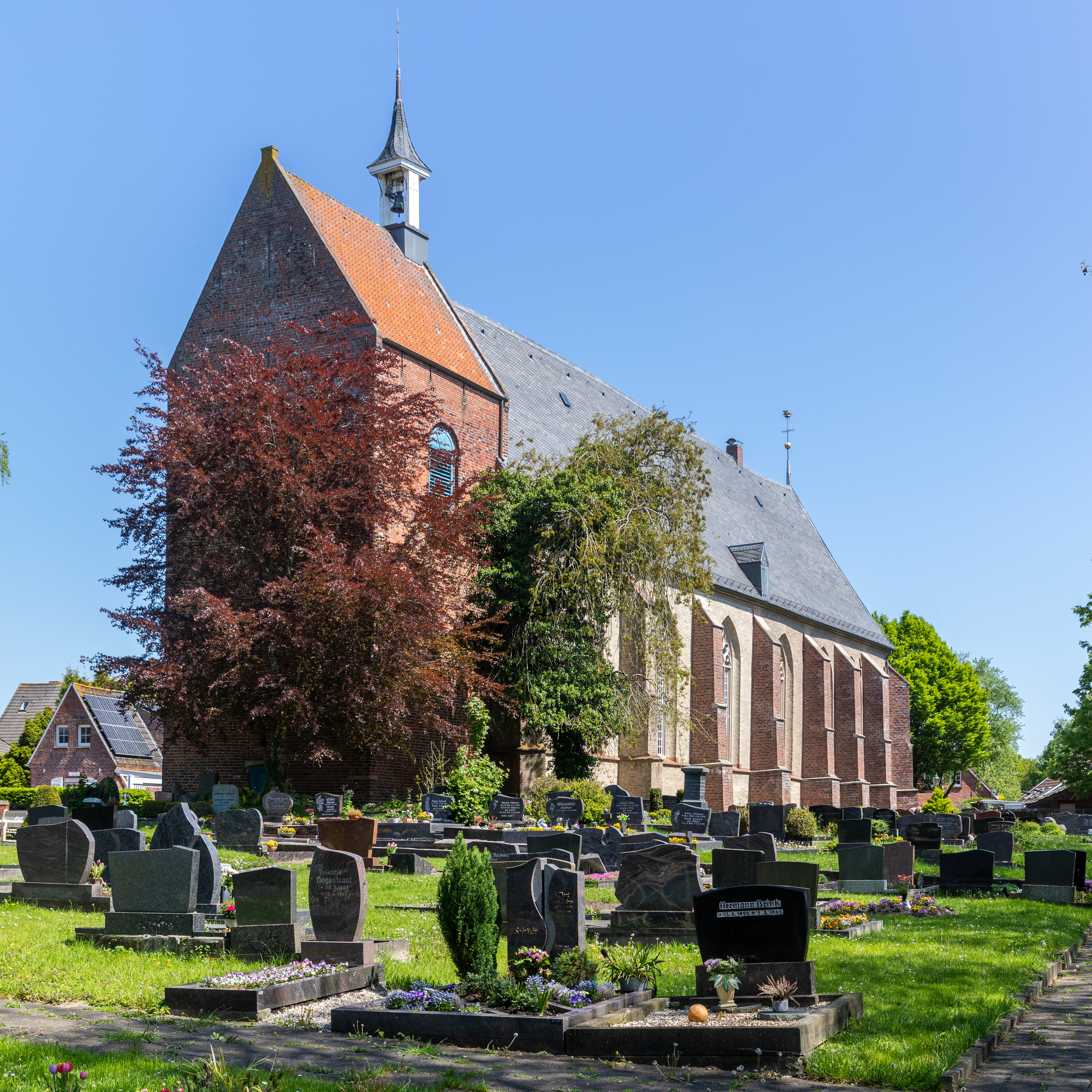
Church of Larrelt

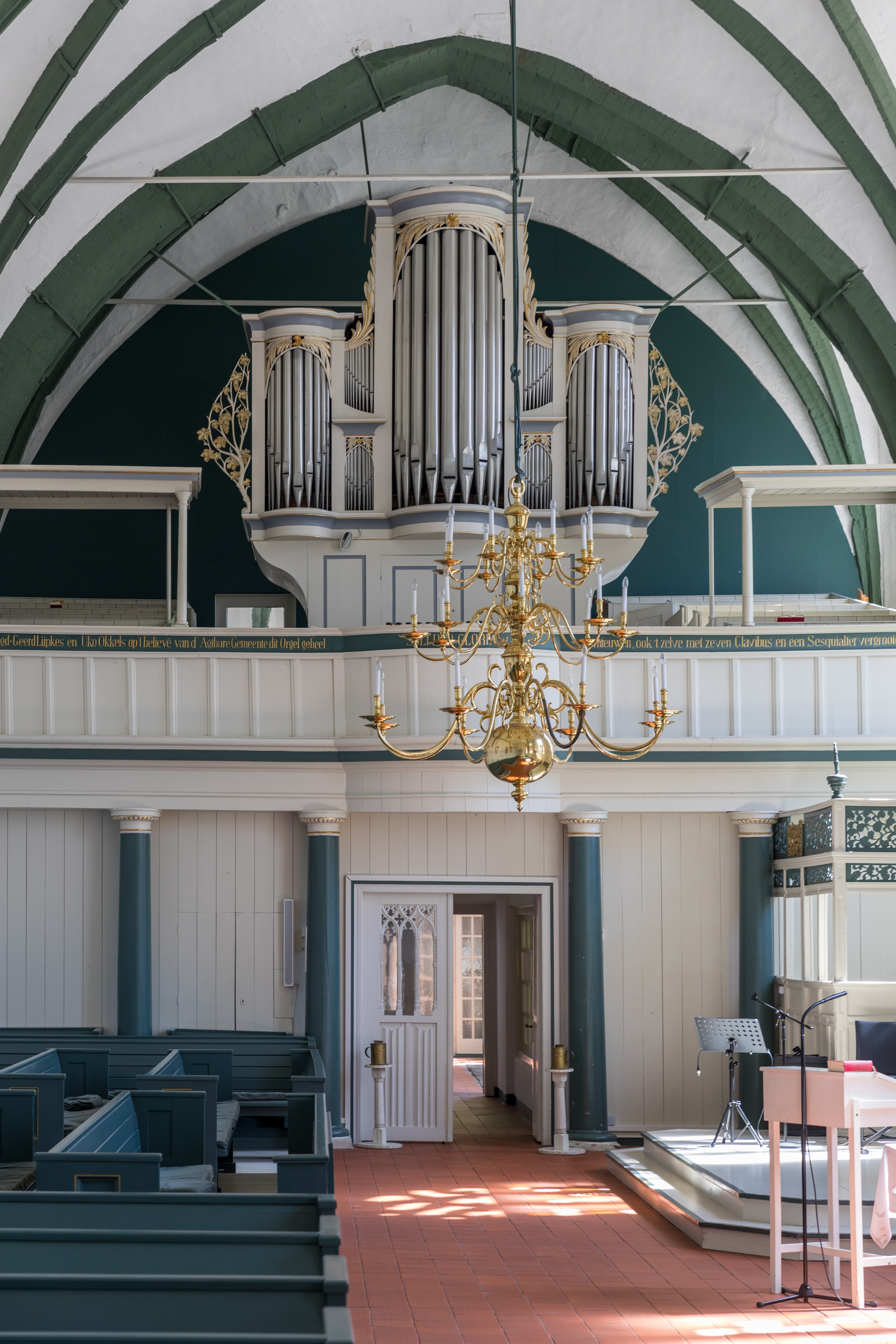
Organ in the church
