= Heinrich Hermann Freytag =

Dutch organ-builder

Heinrich Hermann Freytag (born around 15 April 1759 in Hamburg, died 14 April 1811) was a German/Dutch organ builder. A pupil of Albertus Antonius Hinsz, he became one of the most important organ builders in the Netherlands around 1800. His work, of a high standard, follows in the traditions established by Arp Schnitger.

== Life ==
Freytag was the son of a cabinet-maker from Württemberg. In 1784 he became an apprentice in the former workshop of Schnitger, which had been taken over by Hinsz. After Hinsz' death, he and Frans Casper Snitger (the grandson of Schnitger, and stepson of Hinsz) ran the workshop together, under the name "Snitger & Freytag". In 1793 he married the widow of an innkeeper from Groningen, Hiskia Hornemann (1765-1817). They produced ten children, of whom five reached adulthood. In order that his wife could continue her business, Freytag entered the guild of innkeepers, and received the "small citizenship" (kleine Bürgerrecht) of the city of Groningen. When Snitger died in 1799 Freytag took over the organ-building workshop, and led north-Dutch organ building into a new era of productivity. He built to a high standard of craftsmanship in the traditions of Arp Schnitger. Freytag's pipework has a more elegant tone compared to that of Hinsz. Although his early instruments are architecturally very much in the style of Schnitger, his organ casework was increasingly influenced by Classicism. In the 1800's, Freytag built a number of single-manual chamber organs with six ranks and no pedal (for example in Lellens, Anloo and Doesburg).

After Freytag's death in 1811, his employees kept the workshop going under the temporary management of his widow, as his own children were still too small to take over. In 1817, Freytag's son and heir, Herman Eberhard Freytag (1796–1869) took over the business, together with his brother Barthold Joachim (1799–1829). Herman Eberhard also worked in Germany, and carried out restorations of Hinsz's organs in Leer and Weener. Herman Eberhard's son, Willem Fredrik Freytag (1825–1861) was expected to continue the family business, but died before his father. Herman Eberhard's daughter, Jantje Freytag also died, in 1862, whereupon Herman Eberhard retired and sold the workshop to the family of Dirk Lohman, who himself had possibly been apprenticed to Freytag.

== Organs on which Freytag worked ==
The roman numerals indicate the number of manuals. An uppercase "P" indicates an independent pedal organ with its own sounding stops, while a lowercase "p" indicates a pull-down pedal linked to the keyboards, merely allowing the player to play manual keyboard notes with their feet. The Arabic numerals indicate the number of sounding registers (i.e. stop-knobs excluding accessories such as tremulants and couplers).

Year	Location	Church	Image	Manuals	Registers	Comments
1785	Groningen	Doopsgezindekerk		I/p	8	Replaced in 1816 by an organ built by Johannes Wilhelmus Timpe
1787	Zwolle	Sint-Michaëlskerk (Zwolle)		III/P	64	Repairs on the 1721 organ by Schnitger
1788–1790	Kampen	Bovenkerk		III/P	46	Enlargement of the organ on which Hinsz had previously worked in 1741-1743; Freytag and F.C.Snitger added an independent pedal and Brustwerk. Today the organ has a disposition IV/P/56. → Bovenkerk Organ (Kampen)
1790–1792	't Zandt	Mariakerk		II/p	12	A rebuild of the 1662 organ on a new gallery, with new windchests, action and keyboards. Eleven of the previous stops and a large part of the casework were reused. The organ was extended to contain four extra notes in the bass and two in the treble in all ranks. Three of the 1972 ranks remain.
1792	Bierum	Hervormde Kerk		I/p	10	A new-build; this was the first organ in the province of Groningen to have the keyboard at the side. Well preserved.
1792/1793	Zuidhorn	Hervormde Kerk		I/p	12	A new-build replacing an older organ; in 1924 the organ was enlarged and greatly rebuilt, and in 2012 restored; about half the original pipework remains.
1793	Ezinge	Hervormde Kerk		I/p	10	Relocation of an organ by an unknown builder, about 1750, possibly Johannes Jacobus Moreau. A large part remains.
1793	Groningen	Martinikerk		III/P	47	Repairs to the organ in the Martinikerk, which today has 52 stops.
1793–1795	Zuidbroek	Petruskerk		II/P	28	A new-build in the style of Louis XVI replacing the older organ by Andreas de Mare. In 1853 and 1884 small changes were made to the disposition by Petrus van Oeckelen, but otherwise remains largely unchanged.
ca. 1796	Built in Groningen, now in Weener	Organeum museum of keyboard instruments		I	5	A chamber-organ built into a chest of drawers
1796–1798	Bellingwolde	Magnuskerk		II/p	17	A new-build; remains in its original condition apart from two reconstructed stops.
1799	Enkhuizen	Zuiderkerk		II/P	20	A rebuild of such extent that it was nearly a new-build. The casework of the Hauptwerk, the pedal wind-chests and a few stops were retained.
ca. 1800	Lellens	Hervormde Kerk		I	6	A "Cabinet organ", i.e. a chamber organ constructed to resemble an item of furniture, originally built for the chateau of Lellens. The organ was moved to the church in 1860, and the chateau, which stood empty from 1875, was demolished in 1897. During the move a pull-down pedal and two side-towers were added, and the 8' Prestant converted to 16'. Otherwise, the original is retained.
1802	Noordwolde	Hervormde Kerk		II/P	18	A rebuild of an older, three-manual organ (ca. 1640, probably by Anthoni Waelckens), largely remaining intact.
1803	Loppersum	Hervormde Kerk		II/p	20	Freytag replaced the pipework of the Rückpositiv in the existing organ of 1735.
1804	Anloo	Magnuskerk		I	6	Another cabinet organ (see Lellens, 1800, above), possibly built for a client from Zuidhorn. It made the first of several temporary appearances in the Magnuskerk in the 1940s as a stand-in while the main organ was being renovated, but is now permanently based in the church.
ca. 1805	Doesburg	Martinikerk		I	6	A new-build of a cabinet organ without pedal, attributed to Freytag. It is unknown for whom it was built, or where it first stood. It was discovered in a farm in Middelstum in 1958, and restored in 1961 for use as a choir organ in the Oude Kerk in Soest. It then entered private ownership in Baarn, before being moved to the Kasteel Groeneveld (Baarn) in 1985. Since 2003 it has been in Doesburg.
1808	Finsterwolde	Hervormde Kerk		I/p	15	A new-build remaining in good condition
1809	Eenum	Dorfkirche Eenum		I/p	10	Addition of a pull-down pedal to a 1703/04 organ by Arp Schnitger
1807–1809	Noordbroek	Kerk van Noordbroek		II/P	24	A rebuild of the Arp Schnitger organ of 1695/96, which had already been modified by Hinsz. Freytag added pedal towers, replaced various stops, fitted new wind chests and manuals. His Prestant ranks remain from all three divisions, and in the pedal other stops are also retained. → Organ at the Dorpskerk at Noordbroek
1809–1810	Bolsward	Doopsgezindekerk		I/p	11	Largely intact
1811	Oostwold	Hervormde Kerk		II/p	18	A new-build whose voicing was probably carried out by J.W. Timpe. It was modified by Petrus van Oeckelen in 1860 and 1883, and is well-preserved.
1811/1812	Warffum	Hervormde Kerk		II/P	24	A new-build which was largely carried out by J.W. Timpe. Most of the old stops remain.

== Literature ==
- Kassel, Richard (2006). Bush, Douglas E.; Kassel, Richard (eds.). The Organ. An Encyclopedia. New York, London: Routledge. pp. 211–212. ISBN 0-4159-4174-1.
- Fock, Gustav (1974). Arp Schnitger und seine Schule. Ein Beitrag zur Geschichte des Orgelbaues im Nord- und Ostseeküstengebiet. Kassel: Bärenreiter. ISBN 3-7618-0261-7.
- Gierveld, Arend Jan (1977). Het Nederlandse huisorgel in de 17de en 18de eeuw. Utrecht: Bohn, Scheltema & Holkema. ISBN 90-313-0294-5.
- Tiggelaar, Koos; Valstar, Albert (1990). Freytag & Snitger in compagnie: een introductie tot het werk van Heinrich Hermann Freytag en diens compagnon Frans Caspar Schnitger junior, "afsluiters" van de 18de eeuwse Gronings-Hamburgse orgelmakersschool. Oostwold: Kerkvoogdij Hervormde Gemeente Oostwold.
- Smit, L.B. (2003). Frans Casper Snitger & Heinrich Hermann Freijtag en de (Noord-) Nederlandse markt voor kerkorgels rond 1800. Groningen: RuG.
