= Sietze de Vries =

Dutch organist

Sietze K. de Vries (born 1973) is a Dutch organist, church musician and academic teacher. In the context of his international concert activities, he became known for his renowned organ improvisations on chorale, psalm, and hymn melodies in numerous styles and the Genevan Psalter in numerous styles, but most especially in that of the Renaissance and the Baroque.

He is one of several organists at the Martinikerk in the Dutch city of Groningen.

== Life ==
Sietze de Vries' father was the organist at the Gereformeerde Kerk (Vrijgemaakt) in Niezijl, where his grandfather was the sexton. During his school years, de Vries attended the Gomarus College in Groningen. Since 1988, he received organ lessons from lecturers at the Prins Claus Conservatorium in Groningen. The lessons took place at the famous Organ in the Martinikerk at Groningen, which received its authoritative form in 1692 through Arp Schnitger. de Vries studied at the Groningen Conservatory with Johan Beeftink, Jan Jongepier and Wim van Beek until he obtained his bachelor's degree in 1994. At the Royal Conservatory of The Hague followed two years in the organ class of Jos van der Kooy, graduating with a master's degree in 1996. There, de Vries deepened his knowledge of improvisation with van der Kooy from 1996 to 1998. Since 1994, de Vries has been active as a concert organist. In 2002, he won the International Organ Improvisation Competition in Haarlem.

At the Southern Adventist University in Tennessee, de Vries has held a visiting professorship since 2011. Since 2015, he has been a lecturer in piano at the Prins Claus Conservatorium, and in 2020 he received an appointment there as a lecturer in the organ major, succeeding Theo Jellema from September 2021.

Since 2017, he has shared with Stef Tuinstra the organist position of the Martinikerk Groningen, which was held by Wim van Beek for 60 years before them. In addition, he is still organist with a quarter position at the Immanuelkerk in Groningen, where he has worked since 2014.

De Vries is the artistic director of the Stichting Hinszorgel Leens, a foundation that promotes young talent. He also directs the Organ Education Center Groningen, which, starting with the Hinsz organ of the Petruskerk in Leens, aims to preserve and publicise the historic organ landscape of Groningen (province). He gives organ lessons, leads organ excursions and master classes.

Improvisations in various styles from the Renaissance to the modern are a fixed component of his concerts. As a rule, he adapts stylistically to the instrument and plays in the style of the epoch in which the organ was created. His improvisations present the individual tonal possibilities of the respective organ in the manner of stops performances. His CDs recordings also always include improvisations, preferably in the style of the 17th and 18th centuries. More than 800 recordings have been uploaded on his video channel and in parallel on YouTube (as of 2021). Recently, de Vries started publishing a video-course in organ improvisation.

He regularly writes specialist articles in the field of organ building, church music and improvisation and is editor for the organ building section of the Dutch trade journal Het Orgel.

De Vries bought the deconsecrated church in the village of Niezijl and made it his private residence. The organ there by Marten Eertman from 1907 (originally I/p/10) is being rebuilt in several stages into a two-manual instrument with independent pedal in the style of the late baroque (II/P/21). In addition, there are further keyboard instruments, besides three house organs also harpsichords, a clavichord and harmoniums. de Vries has been married to the conductor Sonja de Vries, (née van der Linden, born 1980) since 2005 and has a daughter and a son with her. His wife grew up in South Africa, also studied music and has conducted the Roden Girl Choristers since 2008. Her husband has been organist of the boys' choir "Roder Jongenskoor" and the girls' choir since 2006.

De Vries speaks four languages fluently: Dutch (his native tongue), German, English, and Afrikaans.

== Publications (selection) ==
- with Dirk Trüten (ed.): Orgelbaukunst. Festschrift für Bernhardt Edskes zum 80. Geburtstag. Verlag Buch & Netz, Kölliken 2020, ISBN 978-3-03805-298-2.
- Drie orgels van de derde Bätz-generatie gerestaureerd. In Het Orgel. Jg. 113, 2017, No. 6, pp. 24–31.
- Van pakhuis tot museum. In Het Orgel. Jg. 113, 2017, No. 2, pp. 20–25.
- Het orgel in Engwierum. Een typische Van Dam-klank in een a-typische kas. In Het Orgel. Jg. 112, 2016, No. 3, pp. 40–45.
- De restauratie van het orgel in de St.-Maartenskerk te Hallum. In Het Orgel. Jg. 112, 2016, Nr. 2, pp. 10–15.
- In memoriam Cornelius Herman Edskes (1925–2015). In Het Orgel. Jg. 111, 2015, No. 6, pp. 30–33.
- Vier Nederlandse nieuwbouworgels, deel 2: tweemaal een concept met zwelkast – Hollandse romantiek? In Het Orgel. Jg. 111, 2015, No. 2, pp. 26–33.
- Vier Nederlandse nieuwbouw-orgels. Deel 1: Twee nieuwe orgels in negentiende-eeuwse snit. In Het Orgel. Jg. 111, 2015, No. 2, pp. 24–32.
- „Der Mensch kann überhaupt nicht spielen“ – Het historische orgel en de improvisatie. In Het Orgel. Jg. 110, 2014, No. 3, pp. 14–18.
- with Cees van der Poel: Het orgel in de Marekerk te Leiden. In Het Orgel. Jg. 109, 2013, No. 1, pp. 10–17.
- Harmonizing. A method to encourage the art of improvising. Boeijenga Music Publications, Veenhuizen 2007.

== Compositions ==
- Laudate Dominum. Psalm 150. Spiritoso Muziekuitgeverij, SPM201709010.
- Psalmbewerkingen in Noord-Duitse barokstijl, deel I. Boeijenga Music Publications, BE1021.
- Psalmbewerkingen in Noord-Duitse barokstijl, deel II. Boeijenga Music Publications, BE1090.
- Thema met variaties en dubbelfuga. God heeft het eerste woord. Boeijenga Music Publications, BE3016, ISBN 978-90-830612-1-4.
- Variaties over Psalm 60. Spiritoso Muziekuitgeverij, SPM201803030.
- Zes Psalmbewerkingen. Boeijenga Music Publications, BE3015.

== Recordings ==
Most of the CD recordings were released on his own label "JSB Records".

- Dübendorf. Sietze de Vries & Roden Girl Choristers. Bach, Mendelssohn en improvisaties. CD, JSB Records JSBD300515 (Dübendorf: J. S. Bach, F. Mendelssohn, improvisations).
- Ein feste Burg. Improvisaties over Lutherliedere. CD, JSB Records JSBB151017 (St. Martin's Church, Bremen: Improvisations).
- Geneefse Psalmen I. CD, JSB Records JSBR010113 (Grote or Jacobijnerkerk, Leeuwarden: improvisations).
- Geneefse Psalmen II. Evangelisch Lutherse Kerk, Den Haag. CD, JSB Records JSBR010119 (Lutherse Kerk, Den Haag: Improvisations).
- Geneefse Psalmen III. De orgels van de Hersteld Hervormde Kerk te Ouddorp en Elspeet. CD, JSB Records JSBR100616 (Ouddorp und Elspeet: Improvisations)
- Geneefse Psalmen IV. CD, JSB Records JSBR010113 (Grote Kerk, Haarlem: Improvisations).
- De historische orgels in Middelburg. CD, JSB Records JSB072017 (Middelburg: G. F. Händel, G. Muffat, J. S. Bach, improvisations).
- 25 Jahre Bernhardt Edskes Orgelbau, 1975–2000. Sietze de Vries improvisiert. CD, BESV, cop. 2000 (Melle, Muri, Hardegsen, Sack, Clauen: Improvisations)
- Katharinenkirche Hamburg. Sietze de Vries speelt werken van Praetorius, Reincken, Bach en improvisaties op het door Flentrop gereconstrueerde „Reincken-orgel“. CD, JSB Records JSBH011214 (St. Catherine's Church, Hamburg: J. Praetorius, J. A. Reincken, J. S. Bach and improvisations).
- Magnificat. Sietze de Vries bespeelt de orgels van de Mariendom te Hildesheim. CD, JSB Records JSBH180920 (Hildesheim Cathedral: J. S. Bach, J. Rheinberger, improvisations).
- Martinikerk Groningen. Sietze de Vries. Bachwerken & improvisaties. 2 CD, JSB Records cjsb1216 (Organ in the Martinikerk at Groningen: J. S. Bach, Improvisations).
- Orgelprobe Martinikerk Groningen. 2 CDs, JSB Records JSBB260718 (Martinikerk, Groningen: J. S. Bach, A. van der Horst, M. Praetorius, J. van Eyck, improvisations).
- Pronkjuwelen in Stad en Ommeland. Het historische orgelbezit van de provincie Groningen. 5 CD + DVD, JSB Records, ISBN 978-90704-2565-4 (Martinikerk and organ der Pelstergasthuiskerk Groningen, Krewerd, Midwolde, Zeerijp, Noordwolde, Kantens, Noordbroek, Nieuw Scheemda, Uithuizen, Zandeweer, Leens, Appingedam, Loppersum, Nieuwolda, Zuidbroek, Huizinge, Farmsum, Middelstum).
- Roder Jongenskoor. A Babe is born. CD, Westra Media WM 081111 (Organ accompaniment).
- Roskilde. CD, JSB Records JSBR010116 (Roskilde Cathedral: D. Buxtehude, H. Scheidemann, F. Tunder, improvisations).
- Sietze de Vries bespeelt de orgels van de Southern University te Collegedale. 2 CD, JSB Records JSB0101117 (Southern University, Collegedale: M. Weckmann, D. Buxtehude, J. P. Sweelinck, Susanne van Soldt, improvisations).
- Sietze de Vries bespeelt de orgels van de St. Jakobi te Lübeck. CD, JSB Records JSBR0101111 (St. Jakobi, Lübeck: D. Buxtehude, M. Weckmann, J. van Eyck, J. P. Sweelinck, Improvisations).
- Sietze de Vries improvisiert. Kögler Orgelbau. Engelszell, Saxen, Kremsmünster, Salzburg-Mülln, Hofkirchen, Pinzberg, Waldhausen, Haag. 2 CDs, JSB Records SDVK0708 (Improvisations).
- Te Deum Laudamus. CD, JSB Records JSBR10115 (Stadtpfarrkirche Haag (A): D. Buxtehude, improvisations).
- Triospiel auf dem Positiv. Die Mohrmann-Hausorgel von Joachim Frisius. CD, MMBCD890 (D. Buxtehude, J. S. Bach, Improvisationen).
