= Albertus Antonius Hinsz =

Dutch organ-builder

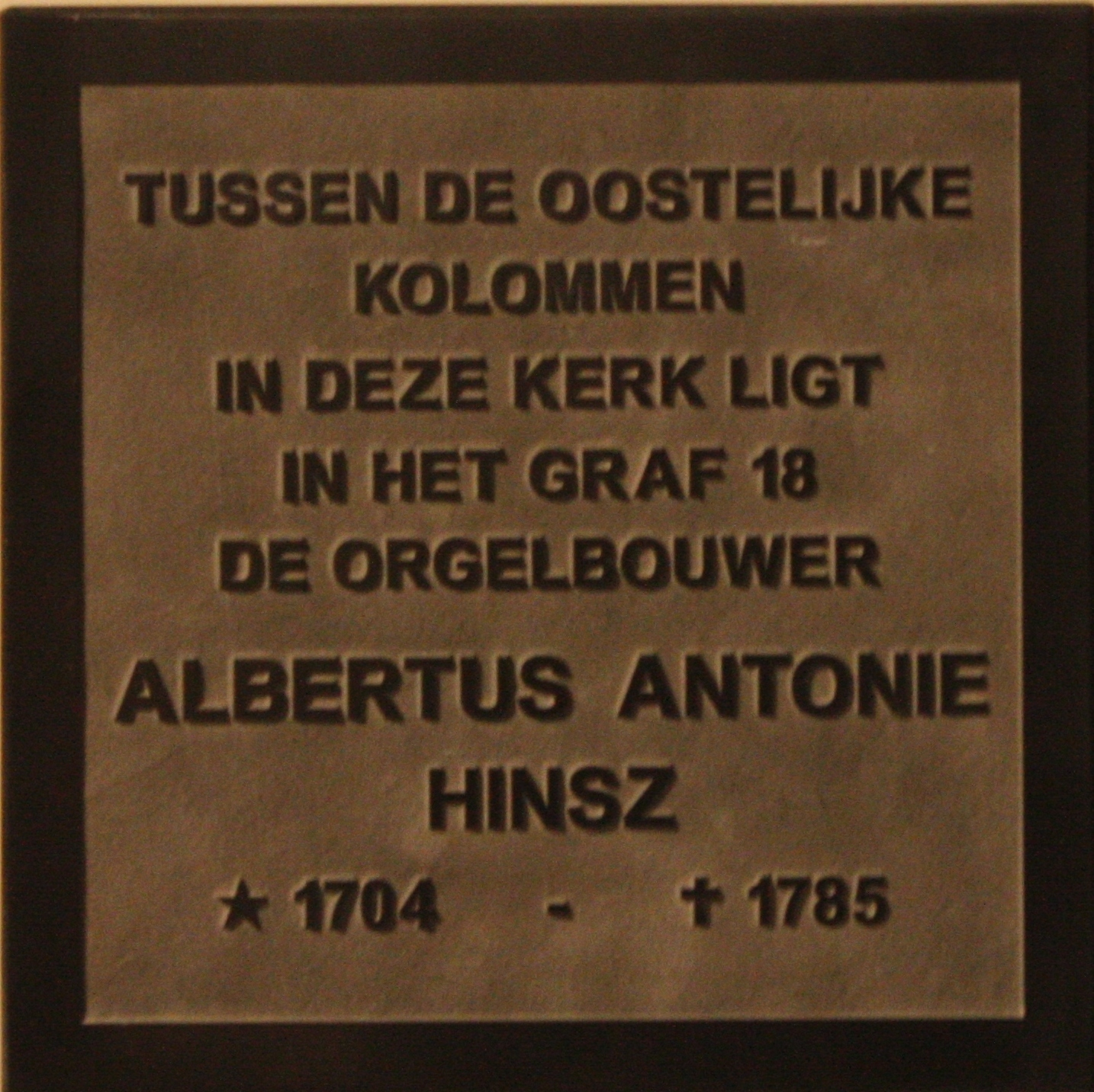
Memorial in the Lutherse Kerk, Groningen: "Between the eastern pillars of this church lies, in grave No. 18, the organ builder Albertus Antonie Hinsz"

Albertus Antonius Hinsz (also Albert Anthoni Hinsch; born 1704 in Hamburg, died 17 March 1785 in Uithuizen, the Netherlands) was an organ builder in the Netherlands who followed in the tradition of Arp Schnitger.

== Life ==
Albertus Antonius Hinsz probably learned his trade with either or both of Joachim Richborn and Franz Caspar Schnitger. In 1728 he settled in Groningen where, on 28 December 1732, he married the widow of Franz Caspar Schnitger, taking over Schnitger's workshop. Hinsz built numerous organs in the North German tradition, across the provinces of Groningen and Friesland. Many of his organs survive to the current day. Tonally, Hinsz organs are noted for their "golden" tone, a result of his tierce-containing mixtures. Architecturally, the casework of his organs follows the pattern of Arp Schnitger. He was a life-long friend of Jacob Wilhelm Lustig, organist at the Martinikerk in Groningen, who also came from Hamburg. Hinsz died during the construction of the organ at Uithuizermeeden. He is buried in the Lutherse Kerk in Groningen, where he is commemorated with a memorial stone.

After his death, his stepson Frans Casper Snitger jr. together with Heinrich Hermann Freytag took over his workshop, which continued to build organs in Netherlands in the tradition of Arp Schnitger into the 19th century.

== Organs on which Hinsz worked ==
The roman numerals indicate the number of manuals. An uppercase "P" indicates an independent pedal organ with its own sounding stops, while a lowercase "p" indicates a pull-down pedal linked to the keyboards, merely allowing the player to play manual keyboard notes with their feet. The Arabic numerals indicate the number of sounding registers (i.e. stop-knobs excluding accessories such as tremulants and couplers).

Year	Location	Church	Image	Manuals	Registers	Comments
1729–1730/1740	Groningen	Martinikerk		III/P	47	Hinsz completed a restoration of the Arp-Schnitger organ initiated by F.C. Schnitger; in 1740 he extended the organ. Major changes were made later, such that the organ today (III/P/52) contains only 2-3 stops from Hinsz. → Organ details
1731	Zandeweer	Hervormde Kerk		II/p	16	This was the first organ newly-built by Hinsz; its disposition was changed in the 19th and 20th centuries
1733–1734	Leens	Petruskerk		II/P	27	A new-build, modified in the 19th and 20th centuries
1735–1736	Loppersum	Hervormde Kerk		II/p	20	Hinsz added new pipework to the Hauptwerk (Great) division of an organ from 1562. In 1803, H.H. Freytag replaced the pipework of the Rückpositiv
1738	Kampen	Broederkerk		III/P	32	A new-build using ranks derived from a previous organ; rebuilt in 1822 by A. van Gruisen (II/p), extended and modified later still
1738	Utrecht	Utrecht University		I/p		A new-build for the Lutheran church in Deventer, extended in 1963 to II/P/22
1739	Bronkhorst	Hervormd Kapel		I	7	A newly-built chamber organ for Utrecht(?). The disposition was changed in the 19th century. Has been moved between various locations
1741–1743	Kampen	Bovenkerk		III/p	33	An enlargement of the existing Slegel organ of 1676, this is Hinsz's largest organ. It was extended in 1790 by H.H. Freytag and F.C. Schnitger to give it an independent pedal and Brustwerk (IV/P/46), and later modified still further. Today's disposition is IV/P/56. → Bovenkerk Organ (Kampen)
1744	Appingedam	Nicolaikerk		II/p	20	A new-build making use of ranks from the 16th century; well preserved
1751	Meeden	Benedictuskerk		I/p	8	A rebuild using a large part of the pipework of the previous organ by Jost Sieburg (1643)
1752/1768	Noordbroek	Dorpskerk		II/P	24	An enlargement of the Arp Schnitger organ of 1696, with changes in disposition; rebuilt in 1809 by H.H. Freytag; disposition further altered in 1855 by Petrus van Oeckelen → Organ of the Dorpskerk, Noordbroek
1754	Kampen	Buitenkerk		II/P	20	A new-build using older pipework
1756–1758	Peize	Hervormde Kerk		II/P	22	An enlargement of a previous organ by A. Verbeeck (1631) and Arp Schnitger (1696–1697) adding a Rückpositiv. The organ was located in the Peper-Gasthuiskerk in Groningen until 1862
1765	Tzum	St. John's Church		II/p	20	Rebuild of an organ by Stevens
1763–1766	Leer	Grote Kerk		II/p	21	A major rebuild that Hinsz created an entirely different organ from its predecessor by Marten de Mare (1609). He enlarged the Hauptwerk from its previous disposition and keyboard compass, provided new casework, and enlarged the Rückpositiv. Today the Organ of the Grote Kerk, Leer has a disposition of III/P/37
1766–1767	Sexbierum	Hervormde Kerk		II/P	27	A new-build. In 1922-1924 the pipework was entirely replaced save a single rank. Six ranks from Hinsz went to Boornbergum, one to Waaxens and four to Sebaldeburen
1769	Wassenaar	Dorpskerk		II/p	13	A new-build. In 1792 the Rückpositiv was extended by L. van Dam. Today's disposition is I/p/20
1770	Haren	Dorpskerk		I/P	13	New build
1772	Midwolda	Hervormde Kerk		II/P	33	A new build, remaining in its original state and in good condition
1774	Groningen	Pelstergasthuiskerk		II/p	20	Enlargement of an organ by Arp Schnitger from 1693/1712. In 1875 the disposition was changed by P. van Oeckelen. → Organ of the Pelstergasthuiskerk, Groningen
1775–1776	Harlingen	Grote Kerk		II/P	34	A new-build, subsequently modified by P. van Oeckelen in 1864. Modified again by Pieter van Dam in the early 20th Century, and various other builders since, culminating in a tonal restoration in 2011. Subsequently, the original contract for the instrument has been discovered.
1776–1777	Dantumawoude	Benedictuskerk		I/p	8	New-build
1777–1778	Minnertsga	Hervormde Kerk		II/p	20	A new-build, destroyed by fire in 1947
1777–1780	Roden	Hervormde Kerk		II/p	17	New-build. The organ was restored as far as possible to its original tuning, pitch and sound in 2005
1776–1781	Bolsward	Martinikerk		II/P	34	A new-build, extended in 1861 by L. van Dam, who added an Oberwerk. The disposition today is III/P/42
1781–1783	Driesum	Grote Kerk		I/p	11	A new-build that underwent various alterations in the 19th and 20th centuries
1783	Godlinze	Pancratiuskerk (Godlinze)		I/p	12	Hinsz rebuilt a two-manual organ by Arp Schnitger (1704) to a single-manual organ
1780–1785	Uithuizermeeden	Hervormde Kerk		II/P	28	Hinsz's last new-build, which he did not complete; various later modifications by other builders

== Literature ==
- Jan Jongepier (Ed.): Een konstkundig orgelmaker. Enkele bijdragen over het werk van de orgelmaker Albertus Anthoni Hinsz (1704–1785). Stichting Groningen Orgelland, Groningen 1994, ISSN 0168-1893.
- Willem Jan Dorgelo: Albertus Anthoni Hinsz. Orgelmaker 1704–1785. Lykele Jansma, Augustinusga 1985.
- De Groninger orgelmaker Albertus Anthoni Hinsz (1704–1785). Ommelander Museum, Leens 1981.
