= Franz Caspar Schnitger =

German/Dutch organ-builder

Franz Caspar Schnitger (baptised 15 October 1693 in Neuenfelde, buried 5 March 1729 in Zwolle) was a German organ-builder active in the Dutch Republic.

== Life ==
Franz Caspar Schnitger was one of the sons of the organ-builder Arp Schnitger. After Arp's death in 1719, Franz Caspar and his brother Johann Jürgen (Georg) (1690–1734 or later) transferred the family workshop to the Netherlands, settling first in Zwolle. There, between 1719 and 1721, they completed the large new organ at the Sint-Michaëlskerk, which had been planned by their father.

In January 1720, Franz Caspar Schnitger married Anna Margreta Debert in Hamburg. She was the daughter of a city councillor from Usedom. They had two sons and two daughters, the first three born in Zwolle, the youngest, Frans Casper Snitger (1724–1799), in Alkmaar. After the untimely death of Franz Caspar Schnitger (senior), Albertus Antonius Hinsz took over his workshop and continued the Schnitger tradition. In 1732 Hinsz married Franz Caspar's widow and became the stepfather of Frans Casper Snitger (junior). Snitger then led his father's workshop following Hinsz' death in 1785, together with Heinrich Hermann Freytag. Freytag's son, Herman Eberhard Freytag (1796–1869) was the last representative of the Schnitger-school of organ-building in the Netherlands, a tradition that thus continued until the middle of the 18th century.

== Organs on which Franz Caspar Schnitger worked ==
The roman numerals indicate the number of manuals. An uppercase "P" indicates an independent pedal organ with its own sounding stops, while a lowercase "p" indicates a pull-down pedal linked to the keyboards, merely allowing the player to play manual keyboard notes with their feet. The Arabic numerals indicate the number of sounding registers (i.e. stop-knobs excluding accessories such as tremulants and couplers).

Year	Location	Church	Image	Manuals	Registers	Comments
1719–1721	Zwolle	Michaelskirche		IV/P	64 (63 on completion)	Work carried out with his brother Johann Georg Schnitger, to the plans of his father; largely survives. This large organ replaced a predecessor destroyed by the collapse of the church tower in 1682, and incorporated some of its pipework. The remaining pipework was cast in a workshop established in the church of Our Lady in Zwolle. After completion, the organ was assessed favourably by three famous organists of the day. Franz Caspar remained in Zwolle and continued to maintain the organ for the remainder of his life. → Organ details
1720	Vollenhove	St. Nicolaaskerk		II/p	19	A major rebuild by Schnitger of an original organ by Apollonius Bosch (1686), with new stops and windchest in the rugwerk. Subsequently, in 1860 pedal towers were added.
1720–1722	Deventer	Lebuïnuskerk		III/p	35	A rebuild by Schnitger of an organ by Bader (c. 1665). The organ was entirely rebuilt by Johann Heinrich Holtgräve in 1839. Holtgrave, impressed by his predecessor's work, retained some labial stops, all the reeds, four bellows and parts of the mechanism. A windchest from the old organ ended up in Borne, and Schnitger's oboe stop in the Bergkerk, Deventer. Unfortunately all Schnitger's reeds were removed in 1892, but have been replaced in 2017/2018 by reeds based as closely as possible on originals elsewhere.
1722	Meppel	Mariakerk		III/p	27	Completion of a new-build started by Jan Harmens Kamp, following Kamp's death in 1721. Later rebuilt and enlarged to (III/P/38). Two or three registers from Schnitger remain.
1723	Duurswoude	Hervormde Kerk		I/P	10	Originally built as a gift for the Lutheran church in Zwolle; sold in 1917 to Duurswoude.
1723–1725	Alkmaar	Laurenskerk	zentriert	III/P	56	An enlargement by Schnitger of an organ by van Hagerbeer, largely preserved.
1728/1729	Groningen	Martinikerk		III/P	47	This renovation was started by Schnitger but completed in 1730 by Hinsz after Schnitger's death.

== Literature ==
- Bush, Douglas E.; Kassel, Richard, eds. (2006). The Organ. An Encyclopedia. New York, London: Routledge. ISBN 0-415-94174-1.
- Fock, Gustav (1974). Arp Schnitger und seine Schule. Ein Beitrag zur Geschichte des Orgelbaues im Nord- und Ostseeküstengebiet. Kassel: Bärenreiter. pp. 247–263. ISBN 3-7618-0261-7.
- Ortgies, Ibo (2004). Die Praxis der Orgelstimmung in Norddeutschland im 17. und 18. Jahrhundert und ihr Verhältnis zur zeitgenössischen Musikpraxis (PDF). Göteborgs: Göteborgs universitet. pp. 117–146.
- Vogel, Harald; Lade, Günter; Borger-Keweloh, Nicola (1997). Orgeln in Niedersachsen. Bremen: Huaschild Verlag. ISBN 3-931785-50-5.
