= Sint Geertruidsgasthuis =

Coordinates: 53°13′01″N 6°34′17″E

The Pepergasthuis (also known as the Sint Geertruidsgasthuis) is a hofje on the Peperstraat in Groningen, Netherlands.

== History ==
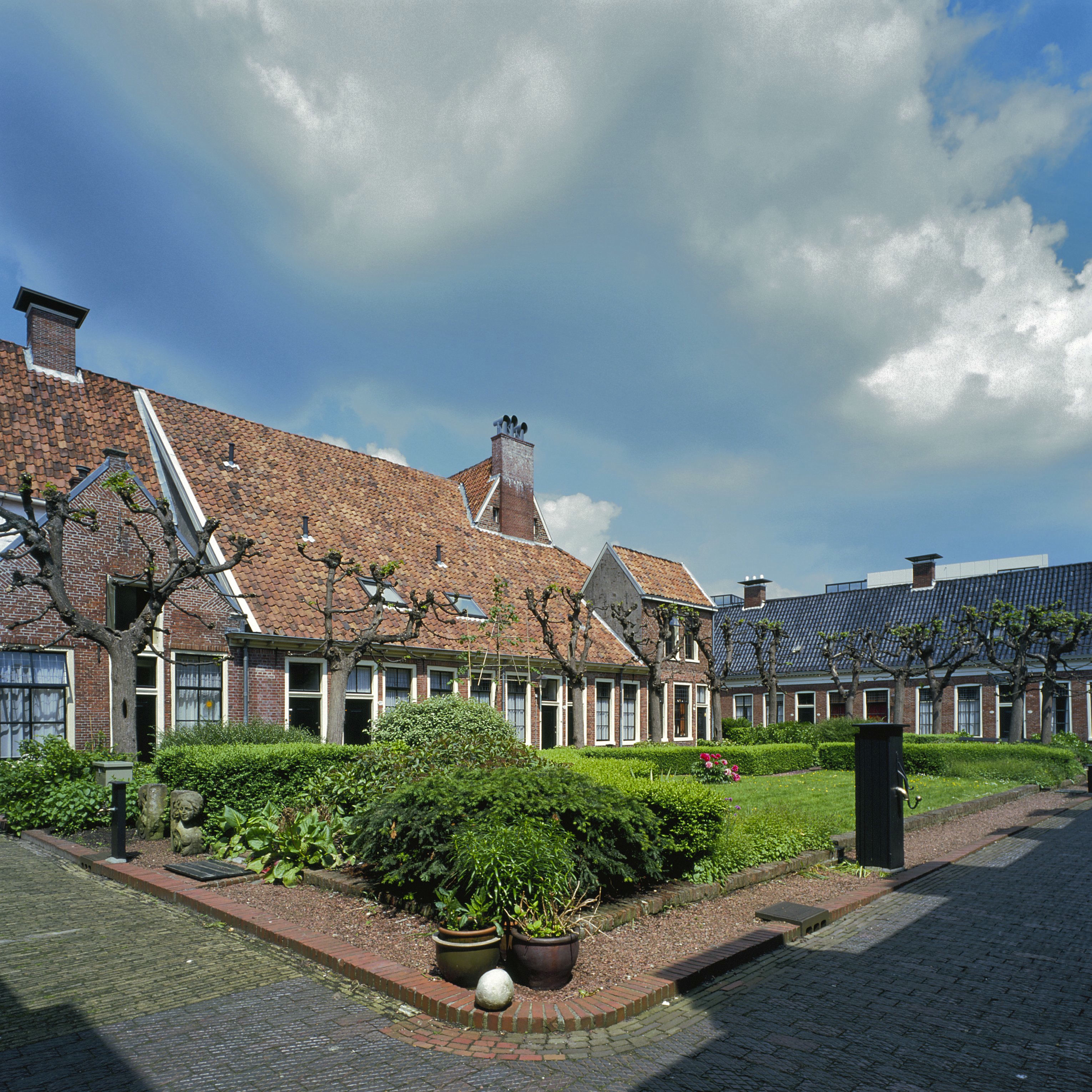
Courtyard

The Pepergasthuis was founded in 1405, by Berneer Solleder and his son Albert. Originally it served as a guest house for pilgrims who came to Groningen, as the Martinikerk kept a relic of John the Baptist that attracted many pilgrims to Groningen. Because of that destination the guest house was named after Gertrude of Nivelles, the patron of the travellers. But the guest house had financial problems, so people like Pope Sixtus IV donated money. Menso Jeltema donated estates, but wanted the guest house to give a ton of herring to the poor people of the village of Faan every year.

After the Spanish capitulation after the Siege of Groningen in 1594, the complex, like all Catholic buildings, was repurposed into a residential complex for the elderly. Part of the complex functioned as a sanatorium. The mentally ill housed here were exhibited for pay on Sundays until 1702, when they were moved to a new guest house at the Rademarkt. The complex has been expanded several times, most recently in 1861.

Its houses remained increasingly vacant throughout the 20th century, in part due to steep costs. Houses were first put up for rent in 1954 to address the issue of grand-scale vacancy. The chapel is now used for ecumenical services; the old dining room is used for wedding services; and there is a restaurant.
