= Organ at the Dorpskerk at Noordbroek =

Historic organ in Noordbroek, Denmark

Coordinates: 53°12′8.56″N 6°52′21.05″E

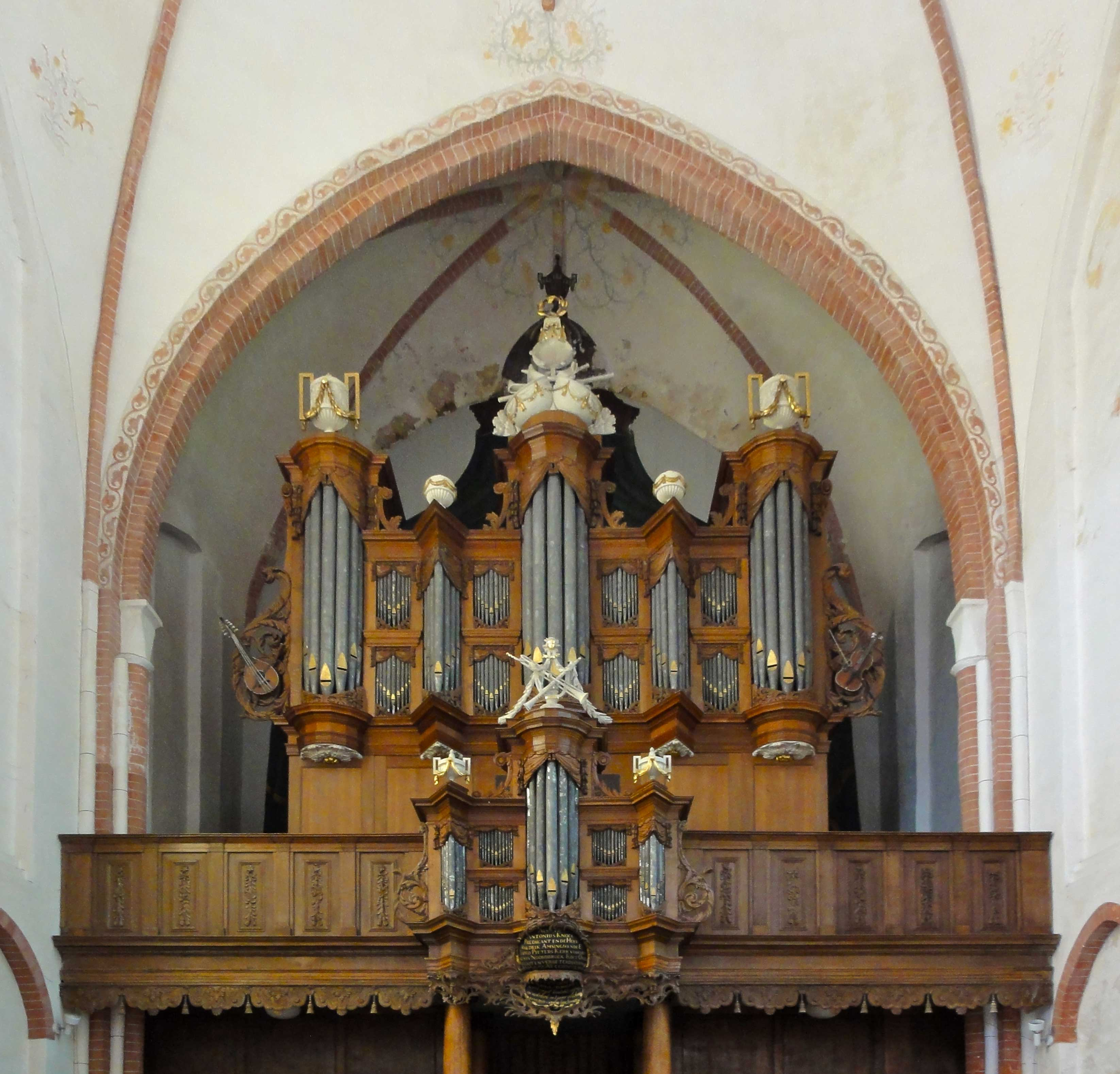
The Arp Schnitger Organ at Noordbroek

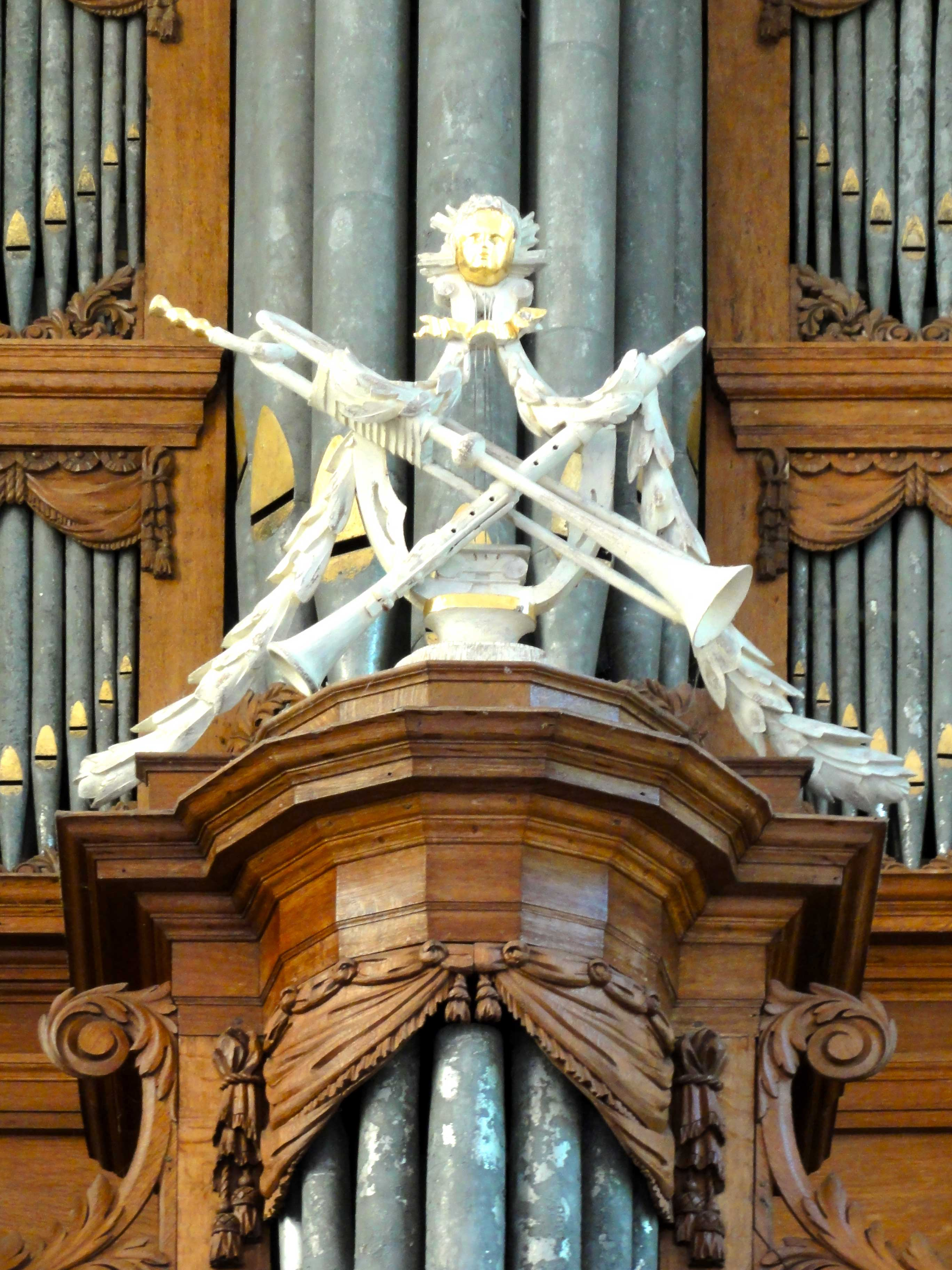
Carvings on te rugpositief in Neoclassical Style (1809)

The organ of the Dorpskerk in Noordbroek in the Dutch province of Groningen was first built in 1696 by Arp Schnitger. Today it has 24 stops over two manuals and pedal. The case and the disposition are largely preserved as they were in 1809.

== Building History ==
=== Schnitger's new organ (1695–1696) ===
The large medieval cruciform church ('Village Church') in Noordbroek already had an organ, and Schnitger re-used three high-quality stops from it in his new organ: two flutes in the Rugpositief and the Quint in the Hoofdwerk. The new organ comprised 20 stops, on Hoofdwerk, Rugpositief and Pedal. The pedal mechanism was sited behind the main case, as Schitger did at Cappel (1680) and Uithuizen (1701). Schnitger's exact disposition at Noordbroek is unknown. The organ in Noordbroek was Schnitger's first major commission in the Netherlands after the rebuilding the organ the Martinikerk in Groningen in 1691–1692.

The Rugpositief case on the gallery parapet is a scaled-down form of Hoofdwerk case and still has its original three-towered shape, characteristic of Schnitger. The elevated polygonal central tower is flanked by two pointed towers. In between the towers are two-storey pipe-flats, which are vertically divided by impost cornices.

=== Later work ===
Albertus Antonius Hinsz extended the instrument in 1768 by three stops, and enlarged the Hoofdwerk case backwards for this purpose. In addition, he built new manual keyboards with a longer compass. The Hoofdwerk was made playable from the lower manual. For the manual departments Hinsz created new windchests and added some new carved decorations. Hinsz put a cartouche below the Rugpositief, with an inscription surrounded by rich rococo carvings.

A further reconstruction took place in 1806 to 1809 by Heinrich Hermann Freytag, placing the organ on the wooden gallery we see now. The balustrade is decorated with relief-like carvings in panels between pilasters. Freytag moved the pedal pipework onto new soundboards either side of the Hooofdwerk, and extended the main case by adding an extra pair of towers. For the new pedal towers he made front pipes with lancet lips in the style of the early 17th century. Freytag may have modelled the design of the front pipes and the pedal sound-board on Schnitgert's organ in Noordwolde, on which he had worked in 1802. He joined the pedal towers to the Hoofdwerk case with pipe-flats in the Schnitger style, so that the organ now had a greatly broadened, five-towered facade. In addition, in collaboration with the sculptor Mattheus Walles, he added crowning vases and urns on top of the case, as well as new side wings, and renewed almost all the carving and the ornaments in the pipe panels in the Classical style. In this way, the facade combines different styles. Freytag built four new wedge bellows behind the organ, where the pedal pipework had previously stood. The west wall behind the organ was painted in 1809 with drapery. The total cost of the conversion amounted to 3450 guilders.

In 1855, Petrus van Oeckelen built a pedal coupler and replaced three stops in the Rugpositief.

=== Restoration ===
Plans for a comprehensive modernization in the 1920s did not materialize. Between 1955 and 1958 the organologist Cor Edskes and Simon Graafhuis (who served as organist in Noordbroek from 1946 to 1983) returned the Rugpositief to its 1809 state. The layers of paint on the gallery and organ case were removed during the church renovation in 1968 to 1974. In 1974 Graafhuis repaired the organ. The company Flentrop reversed van Oeckelen's conversion of the Quintadena 16′ into a Bourdun 16′. Berend Veger & Winold van der Putten carried out further work in 1983 and partially restored the reed stops. Veger and van der Putten carried out another repair in 1996. In 1998 there followed a renewal of the stop plates according to the data of the contract of 1806 with Freytag. In addition, the manual keyboards have been restored. In 2001, Mense Ruiter restored the bellows and built a new wind trunk. A year later, Ruiter re-voiced three stops of the Rugpositief. The dark coloring of the front pipes is due to damage from a fire in the church. In 2003, the organ was set to the Kellner temperament by the Ruiter. In 2015, the wind chests were restored.

== Disposition ==
The present state of the organ (2019):

I Hoofdwerk C–c^{3}
Praestant	8′	Fr
Quintadeen	16′	H/E
Holpijp	8′	S
Octaaf	4′	S
Speelfluit	4′	S
Quint	3′	V/S
Octaaf	2′	S
Mixtuer IV–V	1′	S/H
Trompet	8′	S
Vox humana	8′	H

II Rugpositief C–c^{3}
Praestant	4′	Fr
Fluit douce	8′	V/S/H
Spitsfluit	4′	V/S/H
Octaaf	2′	vO/E
Sesquialter II–III	2/3	E
Scherp III–IV	1/2	E
Dulciaan	8′	H/E

Pedaal C–d^{1}
Praestant	8′	Fr
Bourdon	16′	S
Gedekt	8′	Fr
Octaaf	4′	S
Bazuin	16′	S/Fr
Trompet	8′	S/Fr
Cornet	4′	S/Fr

- sliding coupler II/I (1810), pedal coupler (1855)
- Tremulant
- 3 check valves

== Technical data ==
- 24 stops, 33 ranks of pipes
- Wind system:
  - 4 wedge bellows (1810)
  - Wind pressure: 82 mm
- Windchests: Rugpositief (1768), Hoofdwerk (1768) and Pedaal (1809)
- Mechanism/Action:
  - Keyboards (1810)
  - Key action: Mechanical
  - Stop action: Mechanical
- Temperament:
  - Werckmeister III tuning (modified)
  - Pitch: a1 = 470 Hz

== Bibliography ==
- Cornelius H. Edskes, Harald Vogel, translated by Joel Speerstra (2016). Arp Schnitger and his Work. Bremen: Edition Falkenberg. ISBN 978-3-95494-092-9, pp. 48–49, 175–176.
- Gustav Fock (1974). Arp Schnitger und seine Schule. Ein Beitrag zur Geschichte des Orgelbaues im Nord- und Ostseeküstengebiet. Kassel: Bärenreiter. ISBN 3-7618-0261-7, pp. 234–235.
