= Organ in the Martinikerk at Groningen =

Historic organ in Groningen, Netherlands

Coordinates: 53°13′09″N 6°34′06″E

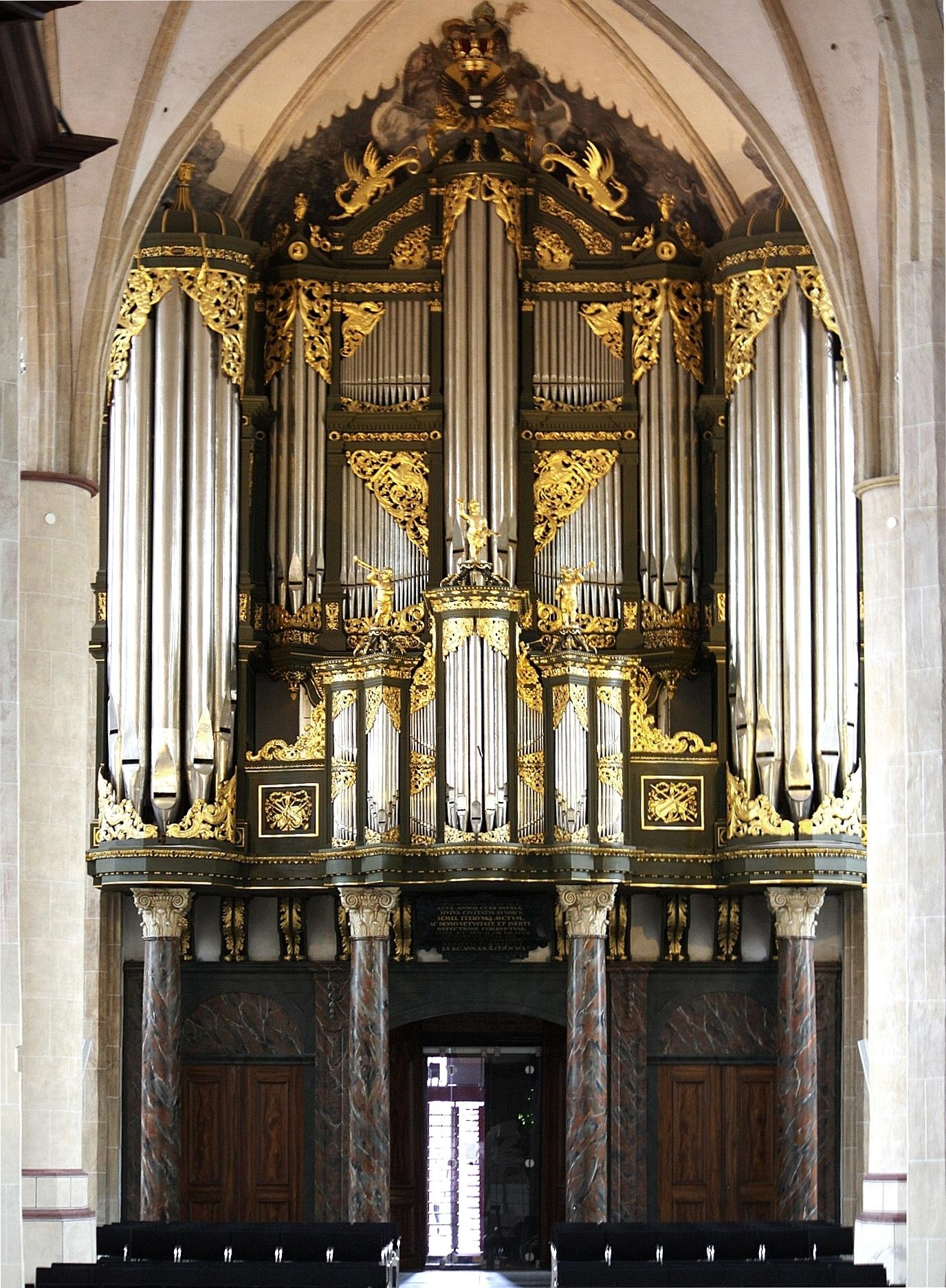
The Arp Schnitger Organ at Groningen

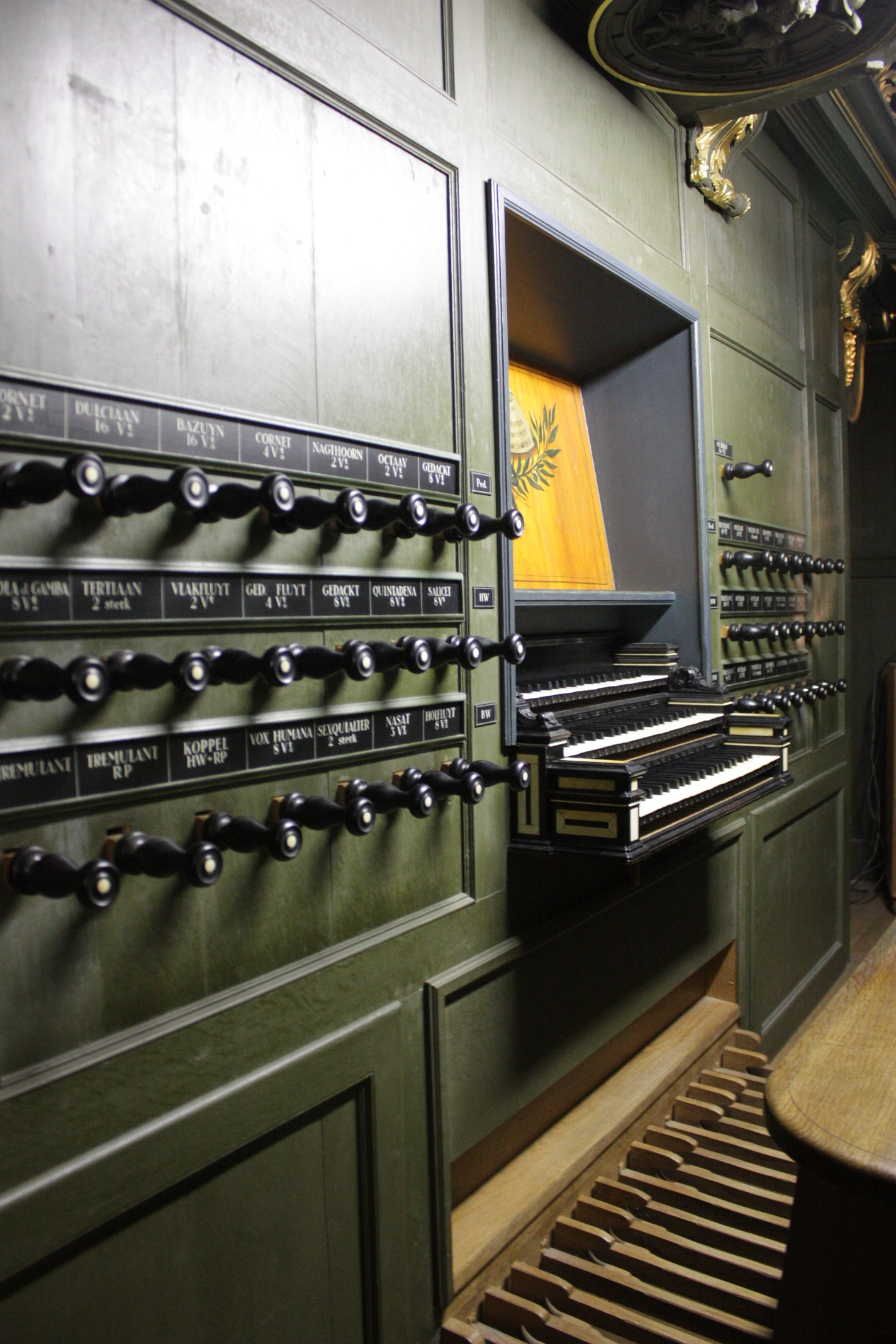
Organ console

The west gallery organ of the Martinikerk in Groningen dates from the 15th century; it took its present form in the 18th century when it was expanded by Arp Schnitger, his son Franz Caspar Schnitger and his successor Albertus Antonius Hinsz. It has 52 speaking stops on three manuals and pedal, and is one of the largest and most famous baroque organs in Northern Europe.

== Building history ==
=== Predecessor ===
An instrument was built in the Martinikerk in the middle of the 15th century; this was expanded in 1479 after the construction of the Gothic tower, probably under the direction of Rodolphus Agricola, Groningen's syndic and a noted humanist. From this late-Gothic instrument, numerous pipes survive today. Even beyond the time of Schnitger's rebuilding, the organ was 'branded' as the work of Agricola, as indicated by the panel placed below the Rugwerk ('Chair organ') in 1691 by the city fathers: "OPUS RUDOLPHI AGRICOLAE ...".

An unknown organ builder (possibly the young Andreas de Mare) extended the instrument in 1542 in the style of the Renaissance (the year is inscribed on the case-work); by then the organ had three manual departments. The manual compass (as typical for the time) was F, G, A-g2, a2 and the pitch was 1 1/2 tones above Schnitger's pitch. The facade of the Hoofdwerk and Bovenwerk dates from this period, embellished with pilasters, mouldings and decorations covering the Gothic structure; the summit of the casework was formed of a gabled frontispiece. Andreas de Mare repaired and extended the organ from 1564. Later, the formerly flat front of the main case gained a rounded central tower and pointed towers on each side. The pipe-mouths in the upper case-flats have the round shape of the Renaissance, while the Gothic pipe-mouths are lancet-shaped.

From 1594, when the church was converted to the Reformed faith, until 1627, the organ was not used in church services. In 1627 and 1628 Anthoni and Adam Verbeeck cleaned and restored the organ. Further changes and extensions took place: for example the organ was provided with seven new bellows. In addition at this time, the facade received its crowning structure with the Groningen coat of arms, flanked by two dragons.

From 1685 to 1690, Jan Helman tried in vain to repair the damage to the organ caused by the 1672 siege of Groningen, and provided the Hoofdwerk with new bellows, keyboards and spring-chests. Helman died in 1690 before completing this work.

=== Extensions by Arp Schnitger and his school ===
On June 9, 1691, Arp Schnitger finalised a contract with the Martinikerk for the organ's restoration, and entrusted the labour to his master journeyman Johann Balthasar Held. With a deadline of less than eight months, Schnitger built a wind-chest for the Bovenwerk (his first with a complete bass octave), changed the disposition and lowered the pitch by moving the pipes along by three semitones. The work was completed at the end of January 1692 to the greatest satisfaction and was evaluated as "extra ordinaris goedt". Schnitger received a follow-up order on February 15 and extended the instrument with mighty pedal towers, building two new wind-chests, two bellows and some new stops. By mid-December 1692 the work was completed. The Principal 32' (from 24' F) in the pedal is the only one by Schnitger which has survived. It was made in the church using ship masts. The three lowest pipes are not in the facade, and are of stopped wood. Allert Meijer's pedal case-work and a total of about six of Schnitger's stops survive from this time.

Arp Schnitger's son Franz Caspar Schnitger built a new Rugwerk in 1728/1729 using some older pipework, and renewed the console. With a total of 16 stops, it was the largest Rugwerk in the Dutch Republic at the time. The case-work was made by the cabinet-maker Egbert Tiddens. When Frans Caspar Schnitger died in 1729, his work was completed in 1730 by Albertus Antonius Hinsz, to whom the care of the instrument was transferred in 1735. In 1739/1740 Hinsz replaced seven stops in the Rugwerk and gave the instrument decorative colouring and gilding, which formed the visual basis of the organ's restoration in the 20th century. The organ now had 47 stops. The initiative for these extensions came from Jacob Wilhelm Lustig, who was organist at the Martinikerk for almost seven decades from 1728 until his death (1796). In 1781/1782 Hinsz repaired the organ. Further repairs were carried out in 1793 by Frans Casper Schnitger Jr. and Heinrich Hermann Freytag.

Close observation of the monumental facade reveals its organically grown nature. The main case of the 16th century contains Gothic facade pipes of the 15th century in the Hoofdwerk and Renaissance pipes of 1542 in the Bovenwerk. They are all characterized by a high lead content. The elevated circular central tower is flanked by two two-storey flats adjoined by pointed towers, which are the same height as the flats. The upper construction with the gable-shaped frontispiece and the two dragons has been crowned since 1628 by the Groningen coat of arms, a double-headed eagle with a golden crown. The majestic form of the organ is defined by Schnitger's mighty pedal towers. The polygonal pedal towers are stylistically matched to the Renaissance style of the main casework. The pipe mouths are lancet-shaped as in the prospectus of the main case; the lower lips are semicircular. On the pedal towers' inward faces (connecting them to the main case), there are two-storey pipe-flats containing dummy pipes. The coronation of the pedal towers with curved spires ending in pommels is without parallel in a Schnitger organ. The upper ornamental frieze carries small panels with the year of construction "Anno / 1692". Two trumpeting angels protrude from the pipe-shade of each pedal tower. With the arrival of the 1729/1730 Rugwerk, the organ took its present form. It does not conform to the strict form of the other cases. The carvings are those of the sculptor Caspar Struiwigh. The seven-axis Rugwerk has an elevated central circular tower. Two-storey concave pipe-flats lead to overhanging pointed towers, which, like the central tower, are crowned by gilded trumpeting angels. Two-storey convex pipe-flats convey to the two-storey concave outer flats. The pipe-flats of all the cases are covered at the top and bottom with carvings of acanthus and volutes and are entirely gilded.

=== Later work ===
Today's marble-painted columns with partly plastered composite capitals were placed under the Rugwerk in 1808. They are partly of stone and replace four wooden columns, which were installed in 1782/1783 to prevent further subsiding of the organ loft. In 1808 and 1816 Nicolaus Anthony Lohman, son of Dirk Lohman, carried out repairs and disposition changes. Petrus van Oeckelen repaired the organ and changed the disposition in 1831. In 1854/1855 van Oeckelen extended and changed the instrument according to the contemporary taste. Further repairs by van Oeckelen are documented in 1867.

In 1904, the pedal action was pneumatized by Jan Doornbos. In 1912, the eight original wedge bellows were replaced by magazine bellows.

The company J. de Koff & Zoon made further changes in 1937–1939 causing extensive intrusions to the historical substance. They provided the organ with a new electrical, detached console. The wind pressure was lowered, new stops installed, the manual compass extended, the pipe work revoiced in a romantic style and the key- and stop-actions made electro-pneumatic. Fortunately, the old wind-chests and the Hinsz console were preserved.

=== Restoration ===
As part of the church's rehabilitation, tenders to restore the organ were sought in 1971 and, under the guidance of the organ expert Cor Edskes, a concept for the organ's restoration was established. The state of 1740 was taken as the starting point of the restoration, with some later registers kept which would fit in with the organ's mature state.

The leading organ restorer Jürgen Ahrend was entrusted with the difficult task and carried it through successfully in two steps: In 1976/1977, casework, Rugwerk and Bovenwerk were restored or reconstructed, followed by the Hoofdwerk and Pedal in 1983/1984. The repair of the Principal 32' was carried out on-site.

== Disposition ==
The present state of the organ (2019):

I Rugpositief C–c^{3}
Praestant	8′	SH
Quintadena	16′	tD/F
Bourdon	8′	U/SH
Roerfluit	8′	SH
Octaaf	4′	A
Speelfluit	4'	A
Gedektquint	3′	SH
Nasard	3′	A
Octaaf	2′	SH
Fluit	2′	tD/U/SH
Sesquialtera II	1 1/3′	A
Mixtuur IV–VI	1′	SH/A
Cimbel III	1/5′	A
Basson	16′	A
Schalmei	8′	A
Hobo	8′	H/A

II Hoofdwerk C–c^{3}
Praestant	16′	tD/U
Octaaf	8′	tD/U/JH
Salicet	8′	L
Quintadena	8'	U/AV
Gedekt	8′	JH
Octaaf	4′	SH
Gedektfluit	4′	L
Octaaf	2′	A
Vlakfluit	2′	L
Tertiaan II	4/5′	A
Mixtuur IV–VI	2/3′	S/A
Scherp IV	1/2'	A
Trompet	8′	S
Viola da Gamba	8′	A(tongwerk)

III Bovenwerk C–c^{3}
Praestant I-III	8′	U/JH/S
Holfluit	8′	M
Octaaf	4′	U/JH
Nasard	3′	S/A
Sesquialtera II	1 1/3′	A
Mixtuur IV–VI	1 1/3′	A
Trompet	16′	A
Vox Humana	8′	A

Pedaal CD–d^{1}
Praestant	32′	S
Praestant (HW)	16′
Subbas	16′	A
Octaaf	8′	tD/U/S
Gedekt	8′	H
Roerquint	6′	vO
Octaaf	4′	U
Octaaf	2′	A
Nachthoorn	2′	H
Mixtuur IV	1 1/3′	A
Bazuin	16′	S
Dulciaan	16′	A
Trompet	8′	S
Cornet	4′	S
Cornet	2′	A

- Couplers: I/II, III/II
- 2 Tremulants

tD = Unknown (Johan ten Damme?) (1482)
U = Unknown (1542)
M = Andreas de Mare (1564)
AV = Anthoni und Adam Verbeeck (1627)
JH = Jan Helman (1685)
S = Arp Schnitger (1692)
SH = Frans Caspar Schnitger/Albertus Anthonius Hinsz (1729)
H = Albertus Anthonius Hinsz (1740)
L = Nicolaus Anthony Lohman (1808/1816)
vO = Petrus van Oeckelen (1855)
A = Jürgen Ahrend (1976–1977, 1983–1984)

== Technical data ==
- 52 stops, 81 ranks of pipes
- Wind system:
  - 2 magazine bellows (de Koff, 1939)
  - Wind pressure: 80 mm
- Windchests: Rugpositief (1730), Hoofdwerk (1984), Bovenwerk (1976) and Pedaal (1692, 1730, 1854)
- Mechanism/Action:
  - Keyboards (1730, 1984)
  - Key action: Mechanical
  - Stop action: Mechanical
- Temperament:
  - Neidhardt III tuning
  - Pitch: a1 = 466 Hz

== Bibliography ==
- Arie Bouman (1941). De orgels in de groote of Martinikerk te Groningen. Amsterdam: H. J. Paris.
- Cornelius H. Edskes (1985). Het orgel van de Martinikerk te Groningen. In: Het Orgel, 81, No. 6, pp. 282–286.
- Cornelius H. Edskes, Harald Vogel, translated by Joel Speerstra (2016). Arp Schnitger and his Work. Bremen: Edition Falkenberg. ISBN 978-3-95494-092-9, pp. 66–69, 178–179.
- Hans Fidom, ed. (2019): Het maakzel van Agricola. De orgels van de Martinikerk te Groningen. Zutphen: WalburgPers, 2019. ISBN 978-94-6249262-2.
- Gustav Fock (1974). Arp Schnitger und seine Schule. Ein Beitrag zur Geschichte des Orgelbaues im Nord- und Ostseeküstengebiet. Kassel: Bärenreiter. ISBN 3-7618-0261-7, pp. 240–241.
- Günter Lade, ed. (1994). 40 Jahre Orgelbau Jürgen Ahrend 1954–1994. Leer-Loga: self-published.
- Maarten A. Vente (1963). Die Brabanter Orgel. Zur Geschichte der Orgelkunst in Belgien und Holland im Zeitalter der Gotik und der Renaissance. Amsterdam: H. J. Paris.
- Erwin Wiersinga, Franz Josef Stoiber, ed. (2019). Die Orgel der Martinikirche Groningen. In: Schöne Orgeln. Baugeschichte – Klang – Prospektgestaltung. Laaber: Figaro, ISBN 978-3-946798-17-0, pp. 102–109.
- Bert Wisgerhof (1985). Die Orgel der Martinikirche in Groningen. In: Ars Organi. 33, No. 1, pp. 34–39.
