= Martinikerk Rondeau =

2009 film

Martinikerk Rondeau is a 2009 Dutch 110-minute documentary film directed by Will Fraser and produced by Fugue State Films for Boeijenga Music Publications, about the historic organs of the Dutch province of Groningen. Centred on the organ of the Martinikerk, Groningen, it also includes the organs of Krewerd, Zeerijp, Loppersum, Noordwolde, Kantens, Uithuizen, Noordbroek, Nieuw-Scheemda, Der Aa-kerk, Groningen, Leens, Zandeweer, Zuidbroek, Farmsum, and Middelstum. The film includes interviews with organ builder Jürgen Ahrend, organ consultant Cor Edskes and organ builder Bernhardt Edskes. It was released as part of the boxed set Pronkjuwelen in Stad en Ommeland in 2009.
