= Cor Edskes =

Dutch organ builder and organologist (1925–2015)

Cornelius Herman "Cor" Edskes (7 August 1925 – 7 September 2015) was a Dutch organ builder and organologist who was one of the most important authorities on the history of organ building in Northern Europe. He acted as the consultant for the restoration of many of Europe's most important historical organs, including those in the Nieuwe Kerk (Amsterdam) and Roskilde Cathedral (both working with the firm Marcussen & Son).

Born in Groningen, Edskes had a working relationship with the German organ builder Jürgen Ahrend that began in the 1950s, included the restoration of many organs in Germany and Holland, and culminated in the restoration of Arp Schnitger's largest surviving organ at St. Jacobi, Hamburg. Edskes was the major onscreen contributor to the documentary Martinikerk Rondeau, in which he detailed the history of organs in and around Groningen.

He died in Haren on 7 September 2015, aged 90.
