= Arp Schnitger =

German organ builder (1648–1719)

- Born: 2 July 1648; Schmalenfleth
- Died: 28 July 1719 (aged 71); Golzwarden (now in Brake, Lower Saxony)
- Occupation: Organ builder

Signature
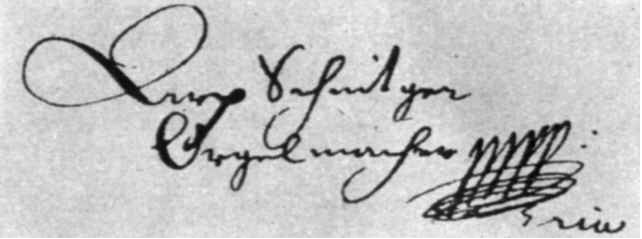

Arp Schnitger (2 July 1648 – 28 July 1719 (buried)) was an influential Northern German organ builder. Considered the paramount manufacturer of his time, Schnitger built or rebuilt over 150 organs. He was primarily active in Northern Europe, especially the Netherlands and Germany, where a number of his instruments still survive.

== Biography ==
Schnitger was born on 2 July 1648 near Schmalenfleth in Oldenburg, Germany, and was baptized on 9 July 1648 in Golzwarden. The exact date of Schnitger's birth is unknown; the scholar Gustav Fock hypothesises it was on 2 July 1648, a week before his baptism. Schnitger was born into a family of woodworkers and wood carvers. He was apprenticed at the age of 18. Between 1666 and 1671, Schnitger studied organ building with his cousin Berendt Huss (c. 1630-1676) in Glückstadt and worked as a journeyman. In 1682, Schnitger and his workshop moved to Hamburg. In 1708, he was appointed organ builder of the Prussian court. In 1684, Schnitger was married to Gertrude Otte (1665-1707). His sons Franz Caspar and Johann Jürgen Schnitger trained with their father and continued his work after his death. His burial was recorded in the parish of St. Pancratiuskirche at Neuenfelde-Hamburg on 28 July 1719.

Schnitger was one of the most prolific builders of his time, having built approximately 95 new instruments, rebuilt about 30, and repaired or renovated another 30. He ran several shops and had a team in Magdeburg, in Bremen and in Groningen. His organ designs typify the essential North German organ: multiple divisions, usually with a rückpositif (division on the gallery rail, behind the player's back); large, independent pedal divisions, often placed in towers on either side of the main case; well-developed principal choruses in each division with abundant reeds, flutes, and mutation stops; and meantone temperament. All of these features could be found on North German organs prior to Schnitger's activity; Schnitger's genius lay in his ability to synthesize these elements into a prototypical style of organ building, and in his prolific output. The latter was made possible by his good business sense: Schnitger was one of the first builders to use cost-cutting measures on a large scale to ensure the affordability of organs for small village churches.

One of Schnitger's landmark instruments, the organ at St. Jacobikirche, Hamburg, was a renovation and enlargement of an instrument previously rebuilt in 1636 by Gottfried Fritzsche (1578–1638).

== Notable examples of his work still in use ==
- St. Cosmae und Damianikirche, Stade (Schnitger's first organ, completed in 1676 after the death of his teacher Berendt Huss)
- St. Peter und Paulkirche, Cappel (perhaps the most authentic of Schnitger's organs still in existence, originally in the Johanniskirche, Hamburg, 1680)
- St. Pancratiuskirche, Neuenfelde, Hamburg (completed in 1688, his largest two-manual instrument);
- St. Ludgerikirche, Norden (1688)
- Martinikerk, Groningen, the Netherlands (1692)
- St. Jacobikirche, Hamburg (perhaps the most famous surviving Schnitger organ, completed in 1693)
- Grote or St. Michaëlskerk, Zwolle, the Netherlands (completed by his son Franz Caspar after Schnitger's death)

== Legacy ==
Organs like these are credited with inspiring the renaissance in organ building during the early twentieth century, with a return to tracker action and smaller, more cohesive instruments, as distinct from the late-Romantic trend of extremely large symphonic organs. In particular, the organ at the Jacobikirche, Hamburg, played a pivotal role in the organ reform movement beginning in 1925, as a series of conferences taking place at historical organ sites in Germany and Alsace was inaugurated there.

A number of Schnitger's organs were featured on recordings by E. Power Biggs, who is generally credited with reintroducing them to modern listeners. More recently, Schnitger's organs can be heard on several recordings by German organist Harald Vogel. Schnitger's instruments in Groningen, Uithuizen, Noordbroek and Nieuw Scheemda were featured in the documentary Martinikerk Rondeau, in which Jürgen Ahrend, Cor Edskes and Bernhardt H. Edskes detail Schnitger's life and demonstrate his working methods. Schnitger's organs have also served as inspiration for many modern builders; GOArt, a Swedish organ building consortium, has even gone so far as to build an exact copy of a Schnitger organ for research purposes.

== Surviving Schnitger organs ==
| year | town | church | picture | manuals | stops | original by Schnitger |
|---|---|---|---|---|---|---|
| 1668–1675/1688 | Stade (D) | St. Cosmae et Damiani | | III/P | 42 | case, prospect, 35 stops (8 partly) |
| 1677–1679 | Bülkau (D) | St. John the Baptist | | I | c. 10 | case, prospect; today II/P/22 |
| 1678–1679/1709 | Jork (D) | St. Matthias | | III/P | 35 | case, prospect; today II/P/22 |
| 1680 | Cappel (D) | St. Peter and Paul | | II/P | 30 | case, prospect, 18 stops, 10 other old stops re-used by Schnitger → Organ of St. Peter and Paul in Cappel |
| 1678–1682 | Oederquart (D) | St. Johannis | | III/p | 28 | case, prospect; today II/P/17 |
| 1682–1683 | Lüdingworth (D) | St. Jacobi | | III/P | 35 | case, prospect, 14 stops (complete or partly), much old pipework reused by Schnitger (half of the organ) |
| 1684 | Elmshorn (D) | St. Nicolai | | II/P | 23 | case; today III/P/33 |
| 1686 | Hamburg-Bergstedt (D) | Ev. Church | | I | 8 | case, 2-3 stops |
| 1687 | Blankenhagen (D) | Village Church | | II/p | 12 | case, 4-5 stops |
| 1687 | Steinkirchen (D) | St. Nicolai et Martini | | II/P | 28 | case, prospect, 13 stops, 8 other partly |
| 1683–1688 | Hamburg-Neuenfelde (D) | St. Pankratius | | II/P | 34 | Main article: Organ of St. Pankratius in Hamburg-Neuenfelde case, prospect, 18 stops |
| 1688 | Mittelnkirchen (D) | St. Bartholomäus | | II/p | 22 | 6-8 stops; today II/P/32 |
| 1688–1690 | Hollern (D) | St. Mauritius | | II/P | 24 | case, prospect, 13 stops (complete or partly) |
| 1686–1688/1691–1692 | Norden (D) | St. Ludgeri | | III/P | 46 | case, 13 stops, 8 old stops reused by Schnitger → Organ of St. Ludgeri in Norden |
| 1691–1692 | Groningen (NL) | Martinikerk (Groningen) | | III/P | 53 | case of the pedal, prospect, 6 stops, other old stops reused by Schnitger; today III/P/52 → Organ in the Martinikerk at Groningen |
| 1689–1693 | Hamburg (D) | St. Jacobi | | IV/P | 60 | 43 stops (complete or partly), some reused by Schnitger → Schnitger organ (Hamburg) |
| 1693 | Groningen (NL) | Pelstergasthuiskerk | | II/p | 20 | case, 2 register (7 partly) |
| 1693 | Eutin (D) | castle | | I | 9 | case |
| 1693–1694 | Grasberg (D) | Luth. Church | | II/P | 21 | case, 14 stops → Organ of the Grasberg church |
| 1695–1696 | Noordbroek (NL) | Hervormde Kerk | | II/P | 20 | case, 10-11 stops; today II/P/24 → Organ at the Dorpskerk at Noordbroek |
| 1695–1696 | Harkstede (NL) | Hervormde Kerk | | I | 7 | case, prospect, 5 stops; today I/p/9 (10) |
| 1696–1697 | Peize (NL) | Hervormde Kerk | | II/P | 22 | case, prospect, 4-6 stops, old stops reused by Schnitger |
| 1697–1698 | Strückhausen (D) | St. Johannes | | II/p | 12 | case of the Hauptwerk, 2 stops; today II/P/15 |
| 1697–1698 | Dedesdorf (D) | St. Laurentius | | II/p | 12 | case of the manuals, 10 stops; today II/P/18 |
| 1697–1698 | Golzwarden (D) | St. Bartholomäus | | II/P | 20 | case; today II/P/22 |
| 1699 | Nieuw-Scheemda (NL) | Hervormde Kerk | | I/p | 8 | case, 4-6 stops |
| 1696–1699 | Mensingeweer (NL) | Hervormde Kerk | | I | 9 | case, prospekt, 6 stops |
| 1699 | Ganderkesee (D) | St. Cyprian und Cornelius | | II/p | 16 | case, prospect, 9 stops; today II/P/22 |
| 1700–1601 | Uithuizen (NL) | Hervormde Kerk | | II/P | 28 | case, 19 stops, 6 others partly → Organ in the Jacobikerk at Uithuizen |
| 1701 | Maia, Portugal | Monastery Church San Salvador | | II | 12 | case, 11 stops |
| 1701 | Mariana, Minas Gerais (Brazil) | Cathedral Nossa Senhora da Assunção | | II/p | 18 | case, prospect, 14 stops (complete or partly); probably by Schnitger's co-worker Heinrich Hullenkampf |
| 1699–1702 | Clausthal-Zellerfeld (D) | St. Salvatoris | | III/P | 55 | case; today II/P/29 |
| 1699–1702 | Groningen (NL) | Der Aa-kerk | | III/P | 32 | case, prospect, c. 13 stops, 10 old stops reused by Schnitger; today III/P/40 → Organ in the Aa-kerk in Groningen |
| 1702 | Estebrügge (D) | St. Martin | | II/P | 34 | case |
| 1704 | Eenum (NL) | Hervormde Kerk | | I | 10 | case, prospect, 4-6 stops; today I/p/10 |
| 1704 | Godlinze (NL) | Hervormde Kerk | | II/p (?) | 16 | case, prospect, 8-9 stops; today I/p/12 |
| 1705 | Accum (D) | St. Willehad | | II/p | 14 | case |
| 1707–1708 | Lenzen (D) | St. Katharinen | | II/P | 27 | case partly, 2-3 stops |
| 1707–1708 | Hamburg-Ochsenwerder (D) | St. Pankratius | | II/P | 30 | case, prospect, 5-11 stops; today II/P/24 |
| 1709–1710 | Weener (D) | St.-Georg | | II/p | 22 | case, 6 stops; today II/P/29 |
| 1710–1711 | Pellworm (D) | Old Church | | II/P | 24 | case, 11 stops (complete or partly) |
| 1710–1711 | Sneek (NL) | Grote of Martinikerk | | III/P | 36 | case, prospect, 10 stops (complete or partly) |
| 1711 | Ferwert (NL) | Hervormde Kerk | | II/P | 26 | 5 stops |
| 1710–1713 | Abbehausen (D) | St. Laurentius | | II/P | 24 | case, prospect, 2 stops |
| 1715–1716 | Faro, Portugal | Cathedral | | II | 22 | probably by Schnitger's co-worker Heinrich Hullenkampf |
| 1714–1716 | Rendsburg (D) | Christuskirche | | II/P | 29 | case, 4 stops; today IV/P/51 |
| 1715–1719 | Itzehoe (D) | St. Laurentii | | IV/P | 43 | case, prospect; today IV/P/58 |
| 1719–1721 | Zwolle (NL) | Grote of Sint-Michaëlskerk | | IV/P | 64 | case, main part of the stops; finished by the sons Franz Caspar Schnitger and Johann Georg Schnitger |

== See also ==
- Johann Sebastian Bach
- Dieterich Buxtehude
- North German organ school
- Pipe organ

== Other sources ==
- Peggy Kelley Reinburg (1982). Arp Schnitger, organ builder; catalyst for the centuries. Bloomington: Indiana University Press. ISBN 978-0-253-30927-3.
- Cornelius H. Edskes, Harald Vogel (2002) Arp Schnitger and His Work (Organ Historical Society) ISBN 9783954940929
