= Martinikerk (Groningen) =

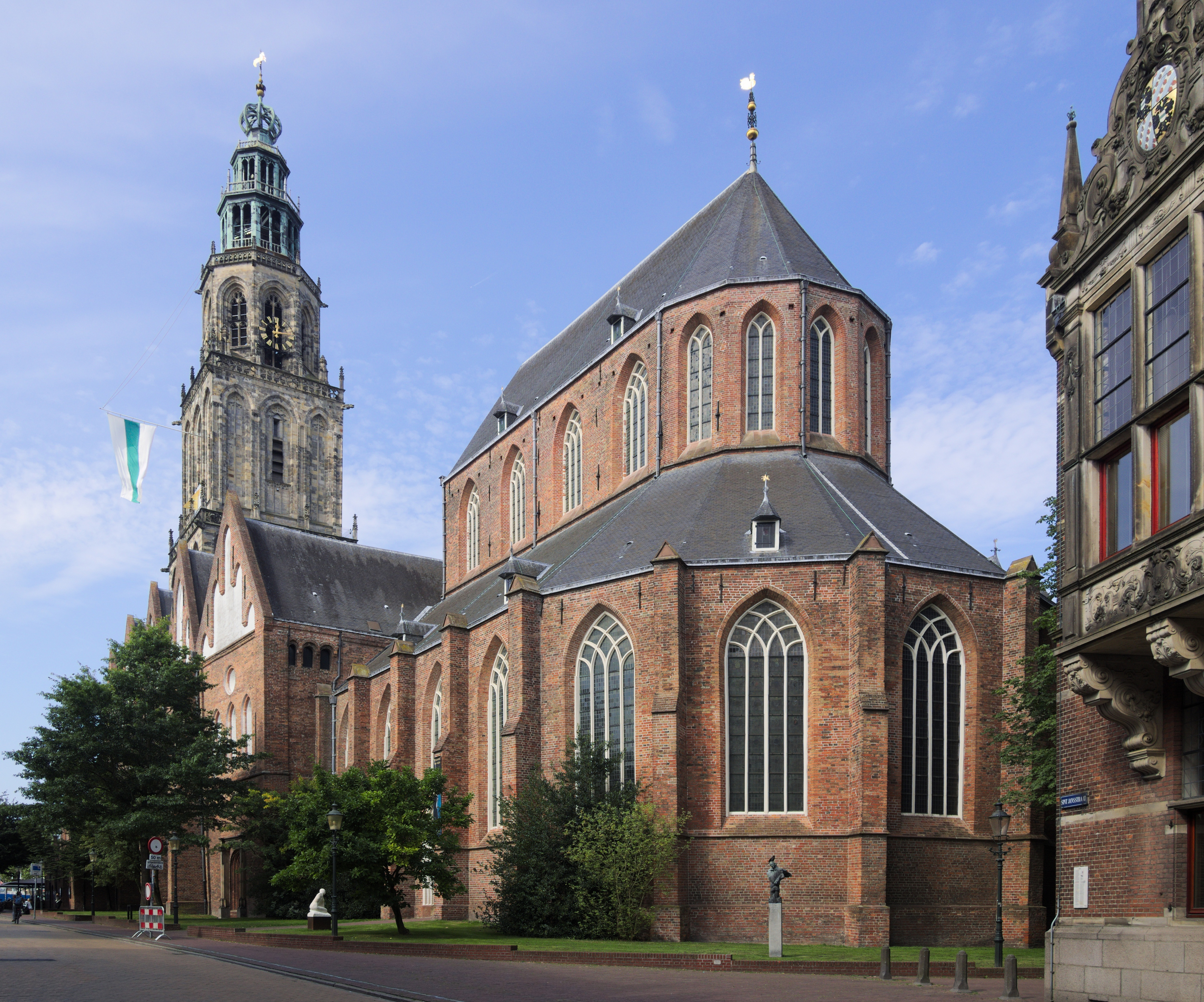
- Martinikerk
- Martinikerk
- 53°13′09″N 6°34′06″E
- Location: Groningen (city), Groningen (province)
- Country: Netherlands
- Denomination: Protestant Church in the Netherlands
- Website: www.martinikerk.nl

History
- Status: Church
- Dedication: Saint Martin of Tours

Architecture
- Designated: 1225
- Architectural type: Cathedral
- Style: Gothic

Specifications
- Height: 97 m (318 ft 3 in)
- Materials: Church: brick Tower: sandstone

The Martinikerk (Martin's church) is the oldest church in Groningen, Netherlands. The church and its associated tower (the Martinitoren) are named after Saint Martin of Tours (316–397), the patron saint of the Bishopric of Utrecht to which Groningen belonged.

== History ==
The church was a cathedral for a short period during the first bishopric of Groningen (1559–1594).

The origins of the Martinikerk are a cruciform church built in the 13th century, which was extended in the 15th and 16th centuries. It contains several 16th-century tombs and Wessel Gansfort's 18th-century tomb. Much of the wall and roof paintwork has been preserved. Of particular note is a 16th-century depiction of the life of Jesus Christ.

The tower was built from 1469 till 1482, with later additions. Citizens of Groningen often refer to the tower as d'Olle Grieze (the Old Grey One). The original 13th-century tower was destroyed by lightning, and a new tower was built in the 15th century, also destroyed by lightning.

Its organ contains stops dating back to 1450, and was rebuilt and enlarged by Arp Schnitger among others. The church and organ are filmed extensively in the documentary Martinikerk Rondeau.

== Gallery ==
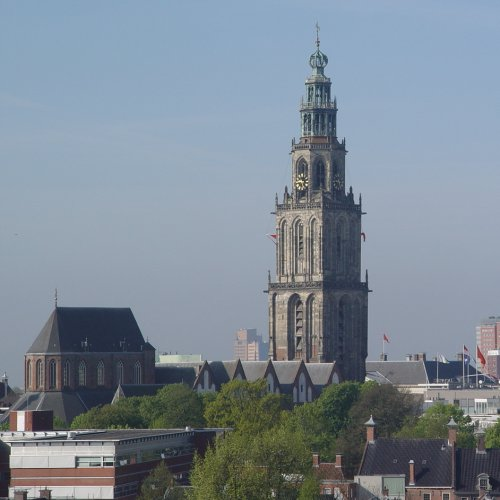
The Martinikerk and its tower

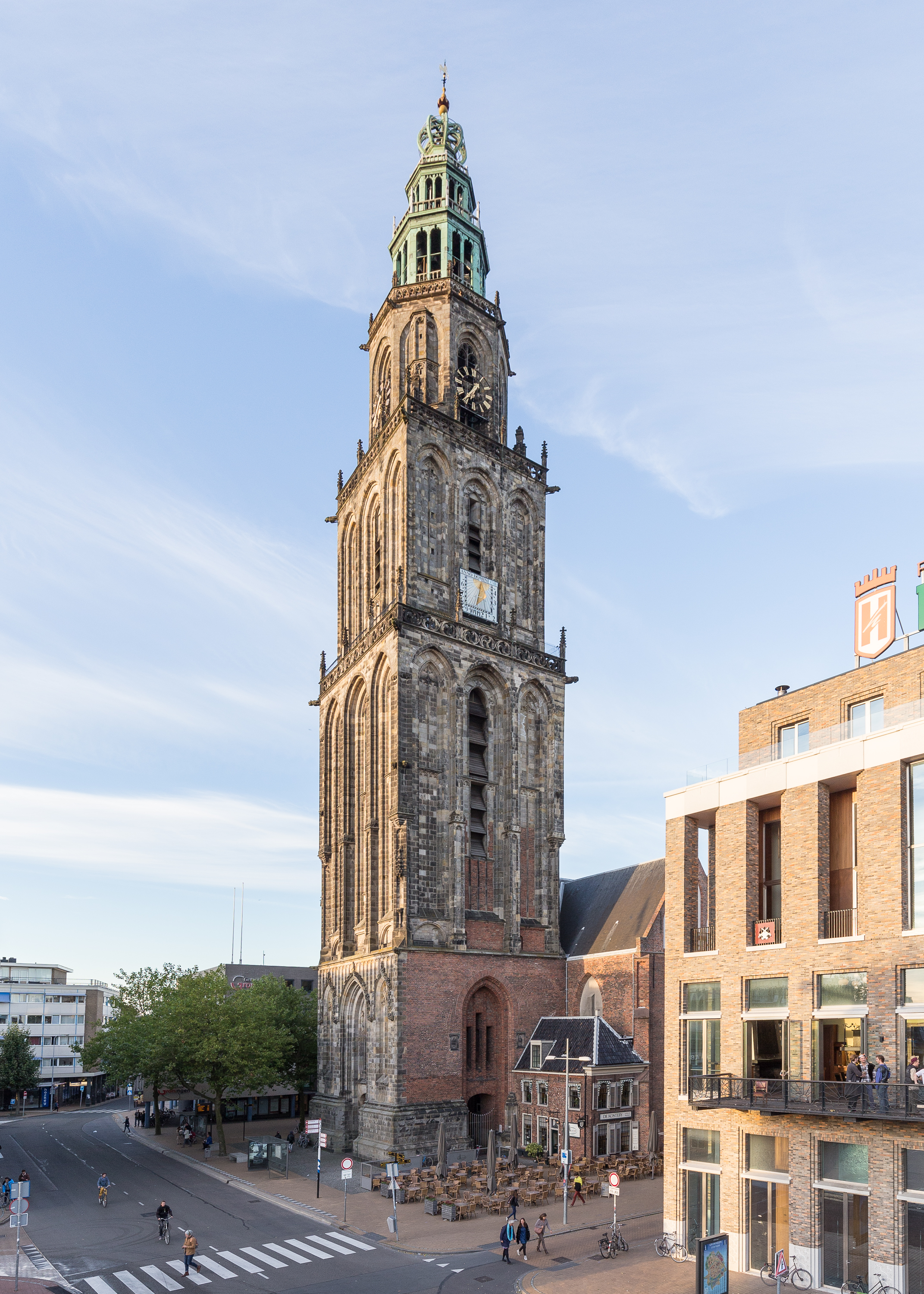
Martinikerk Groningen

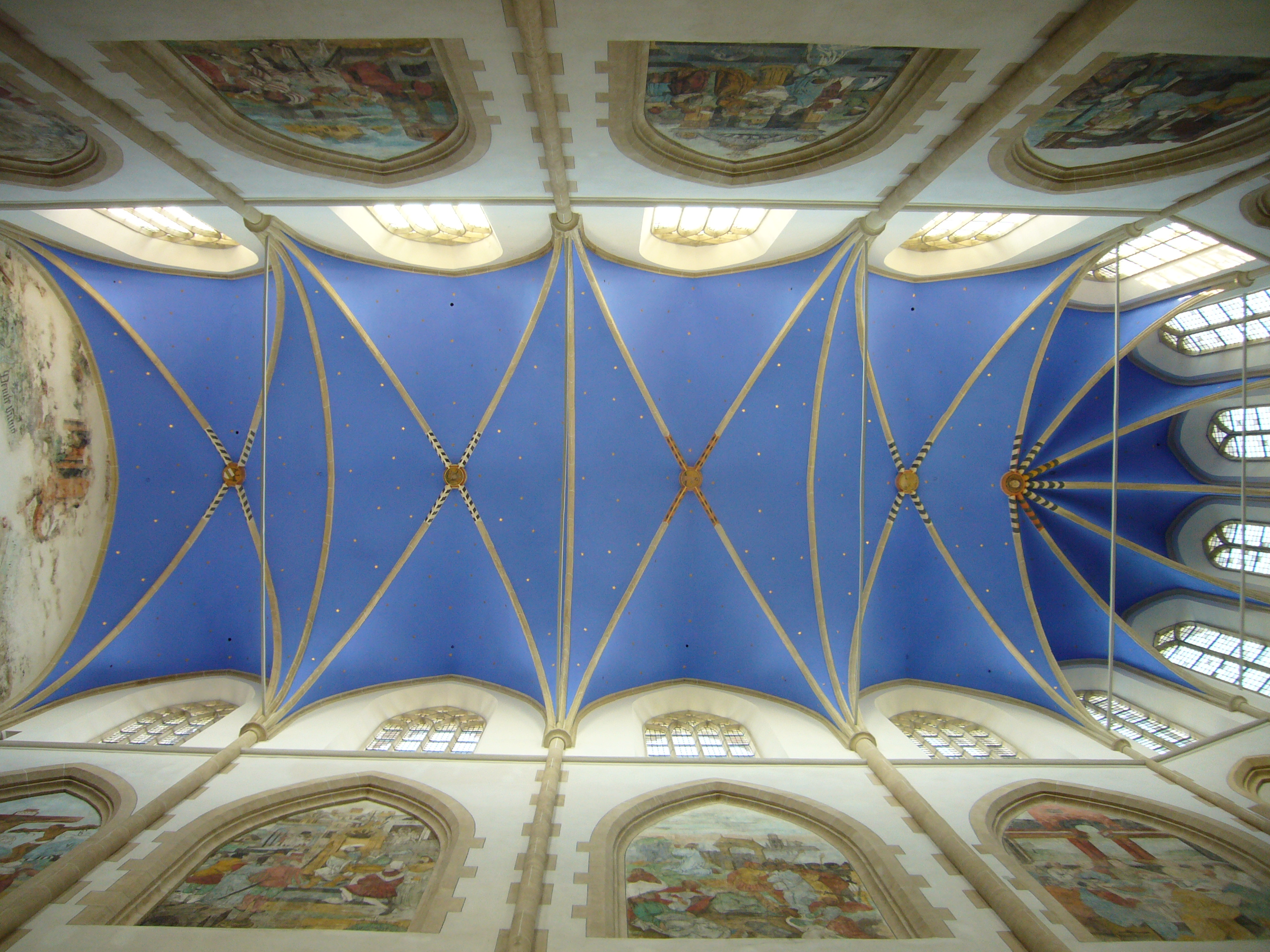
Choir vaulting Martinikerk

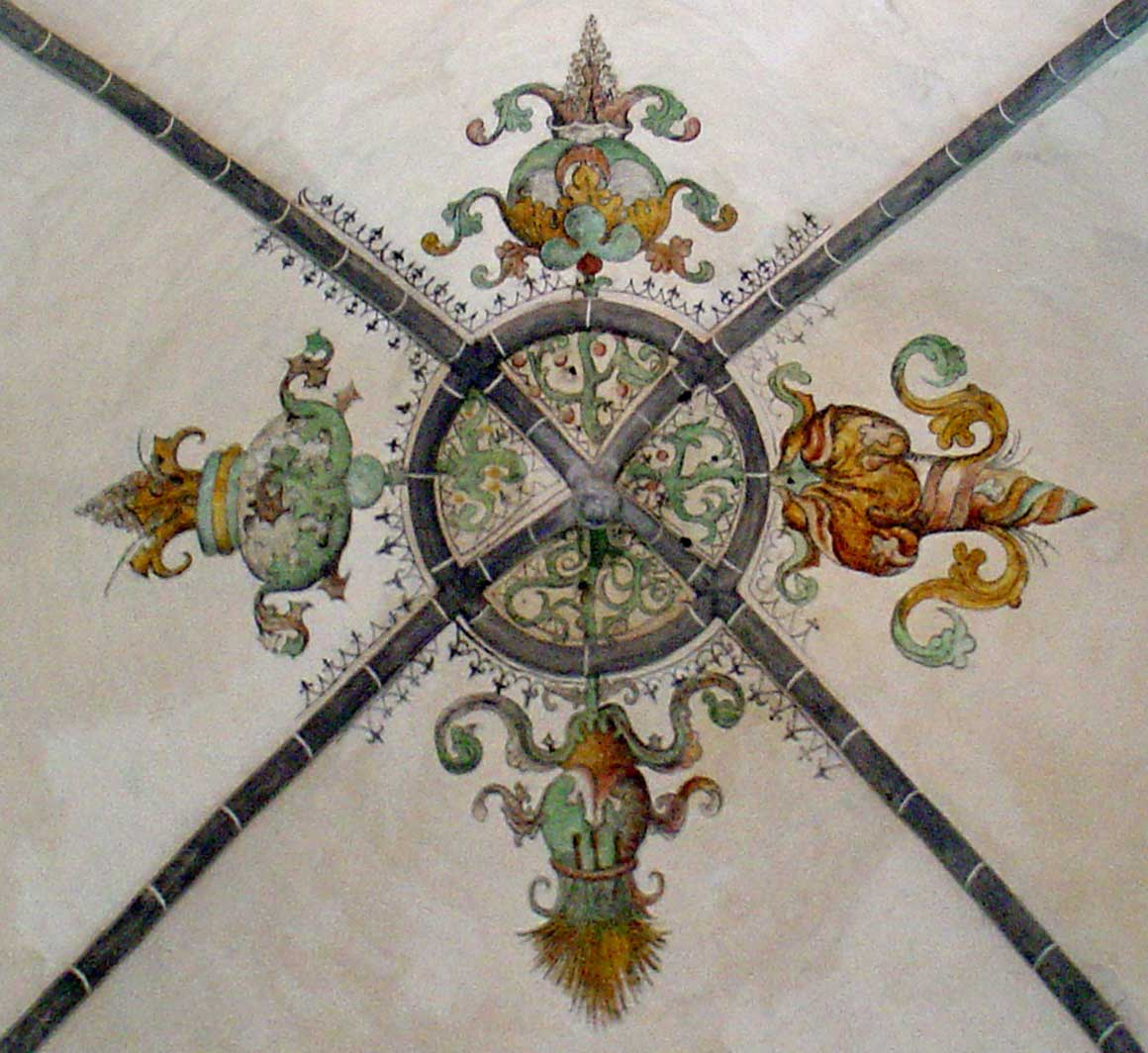
Vaulting painting Martinikerk

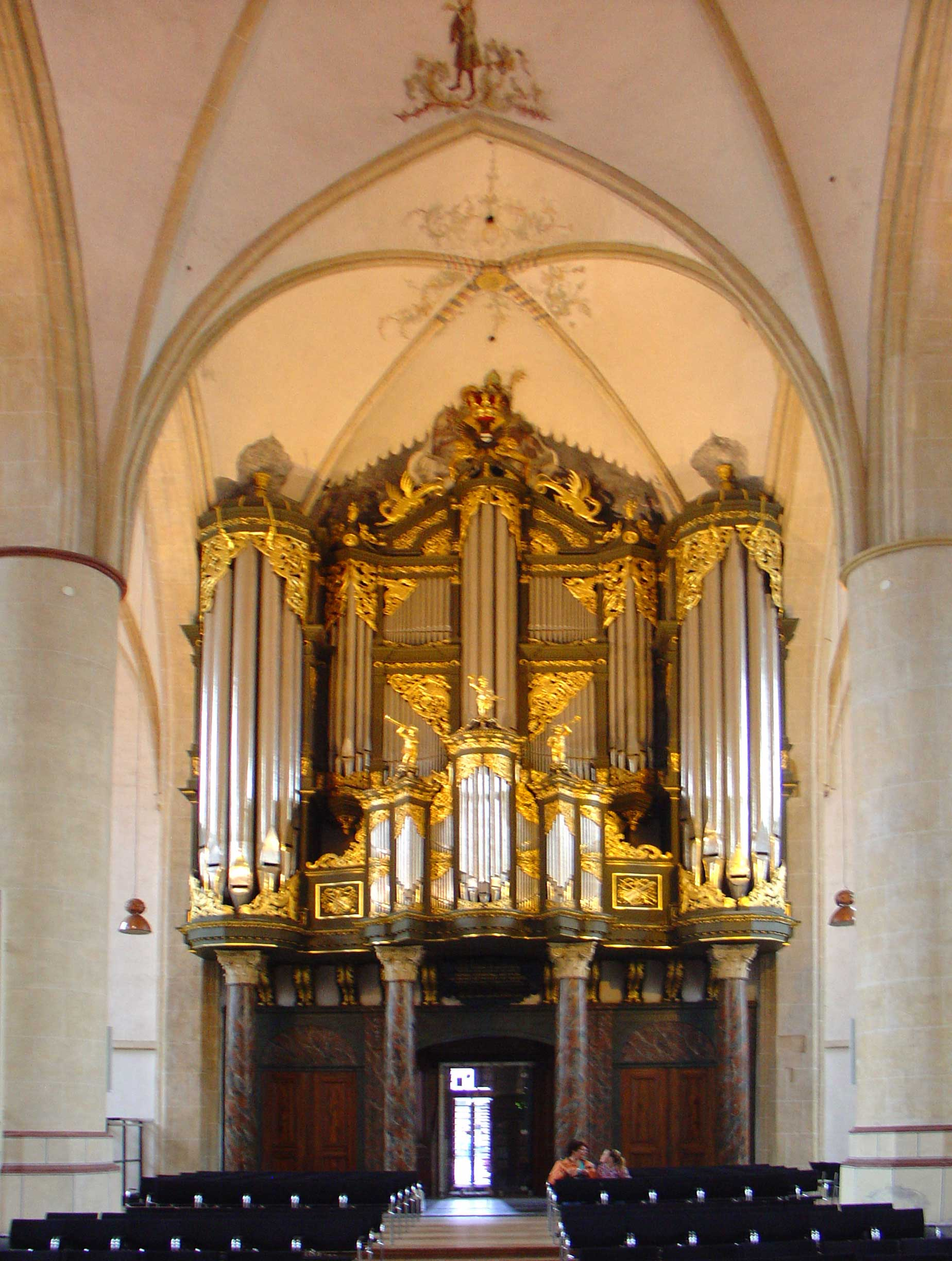
Organ Martinikerk

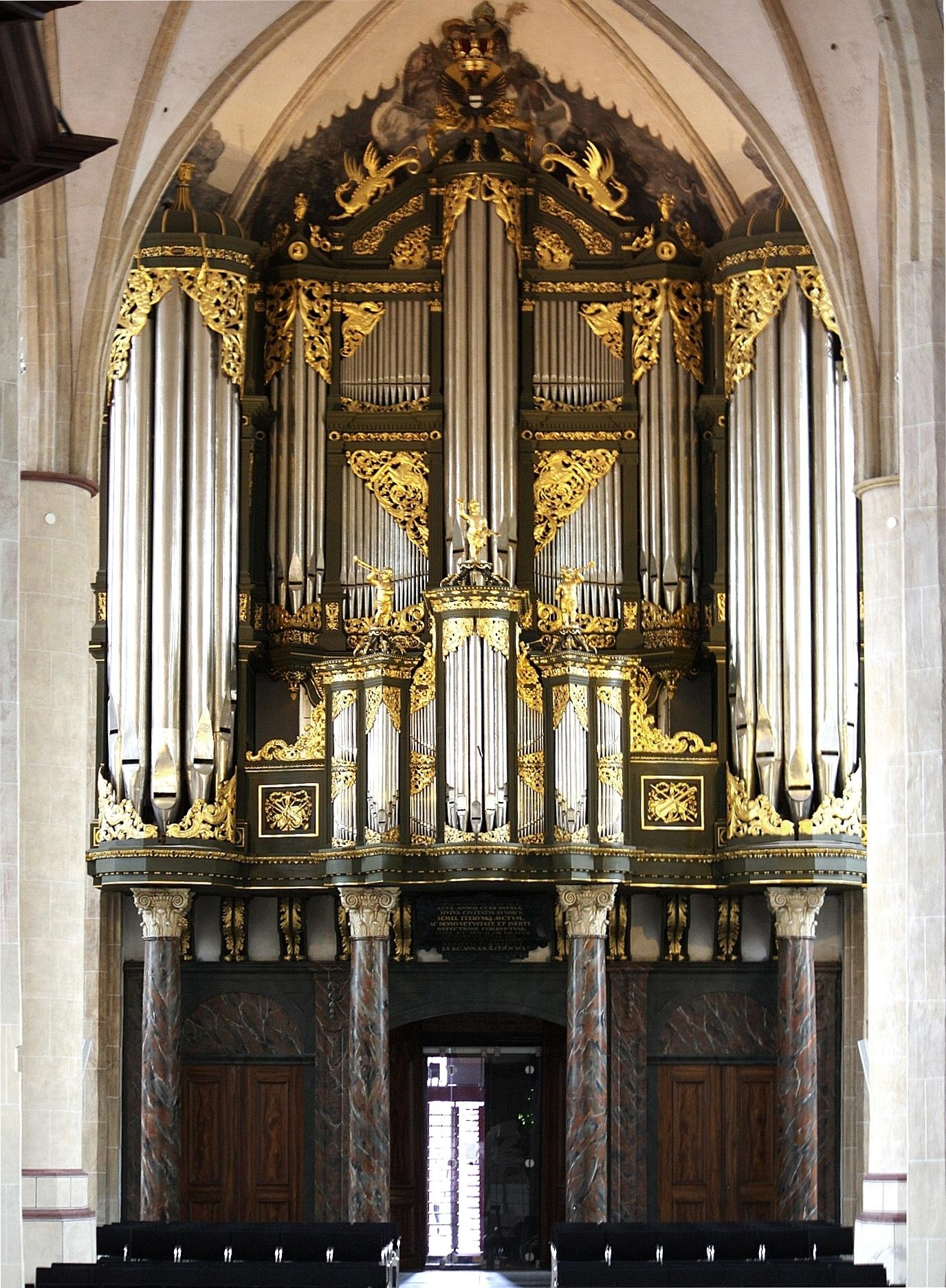
Organ Martinikerk

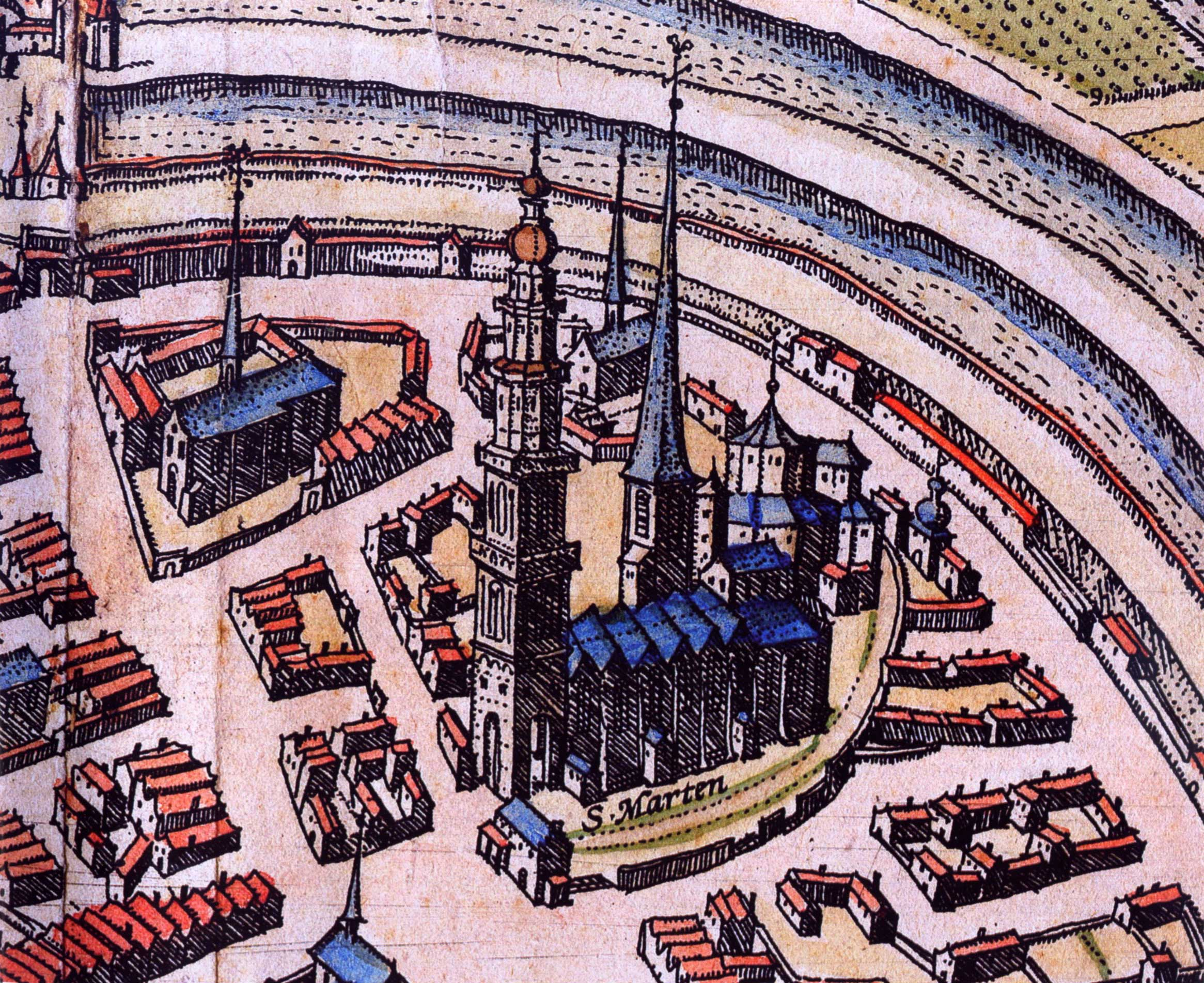
Martinikerk
City Atlas by Georg Braun and Frans Hogenberg 1575

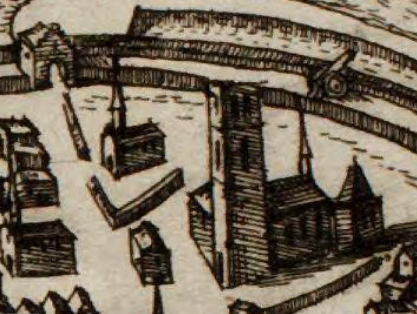
Martinikerk
1594

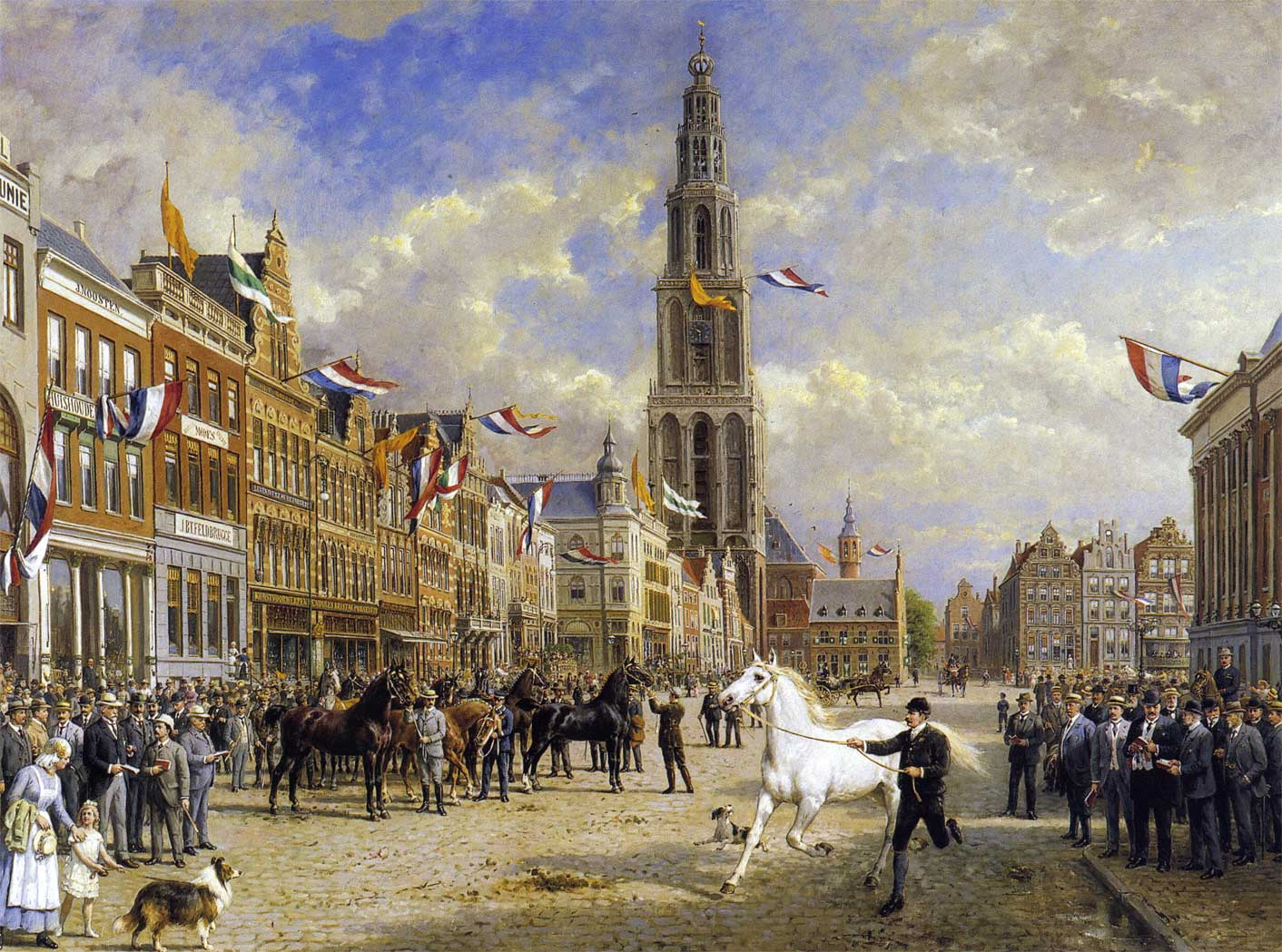
The Horse Inspection (Martinikerk in the background)
by Otto Eerelman 1920

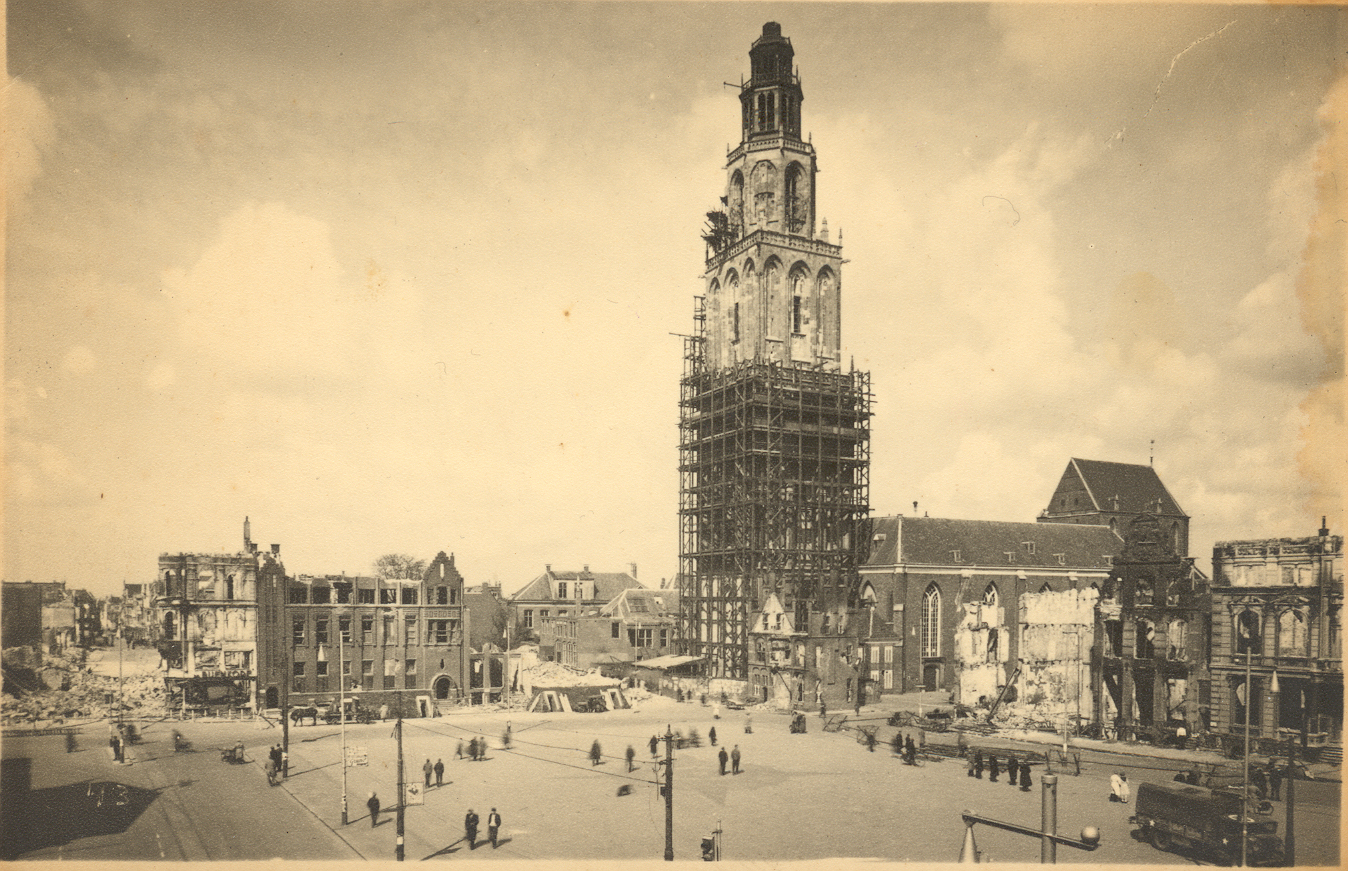
Martinikerk
1945

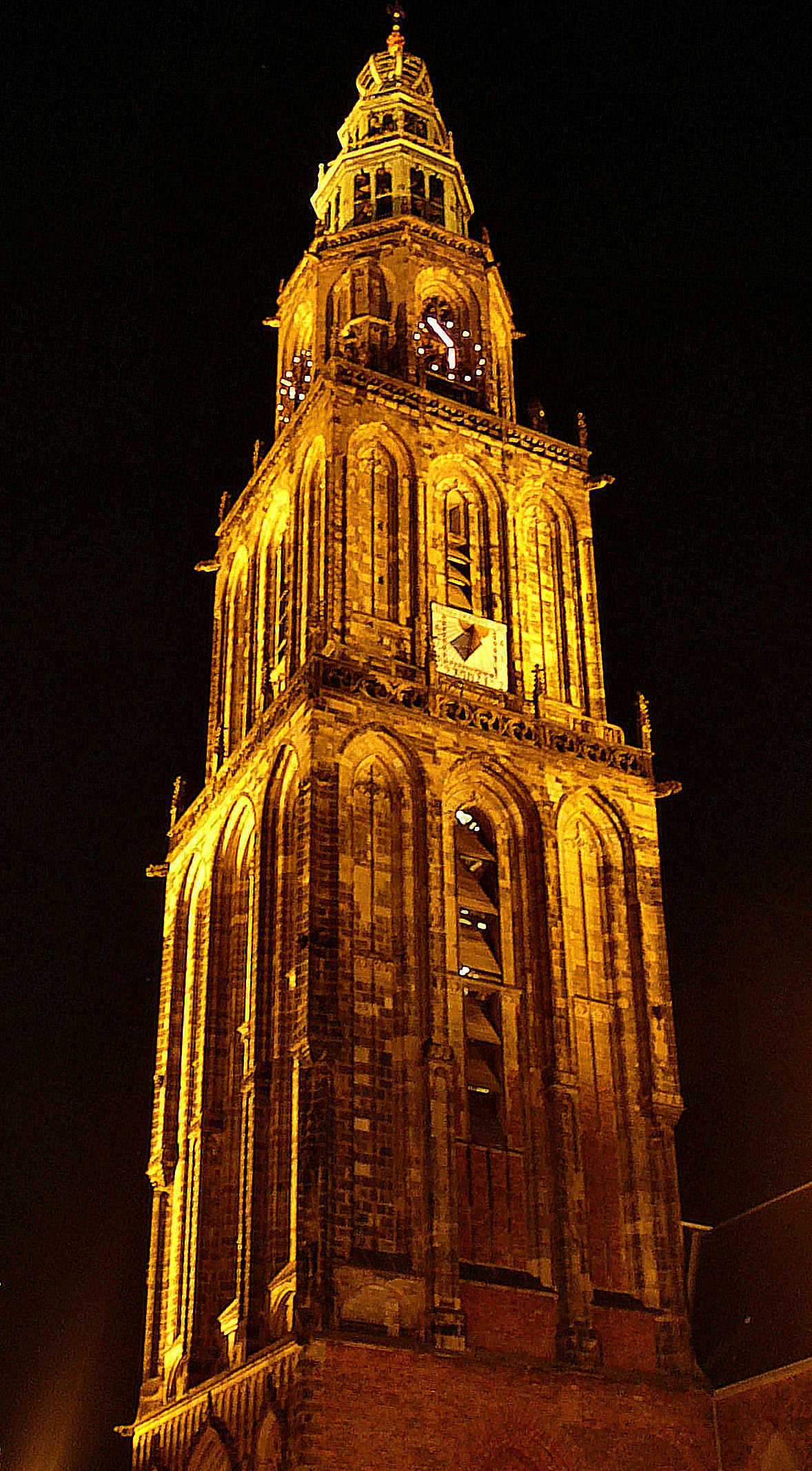
Martinikerk tower by night

=== Photo gallery entrances. ===
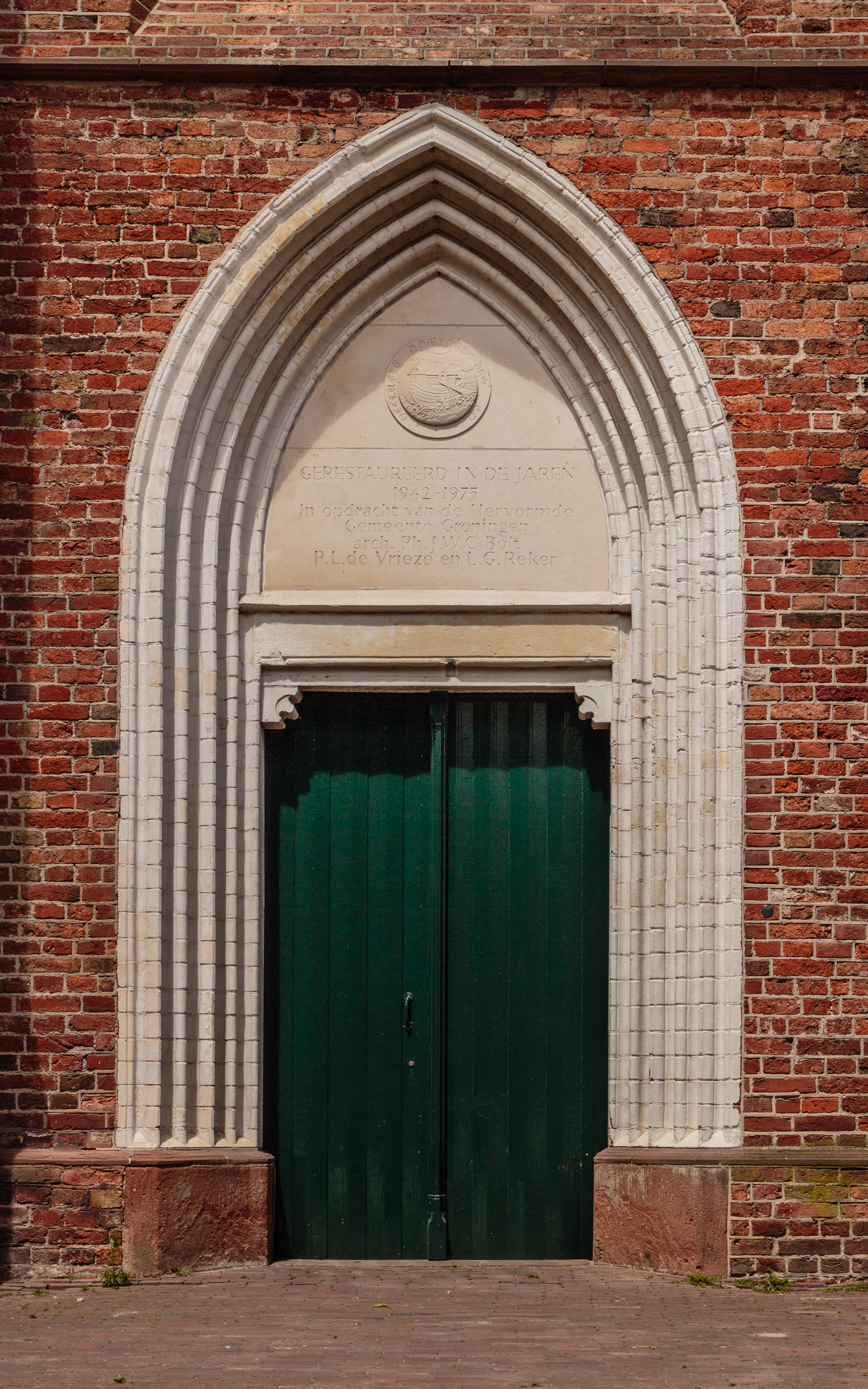
Side entrance with memorial plaque.

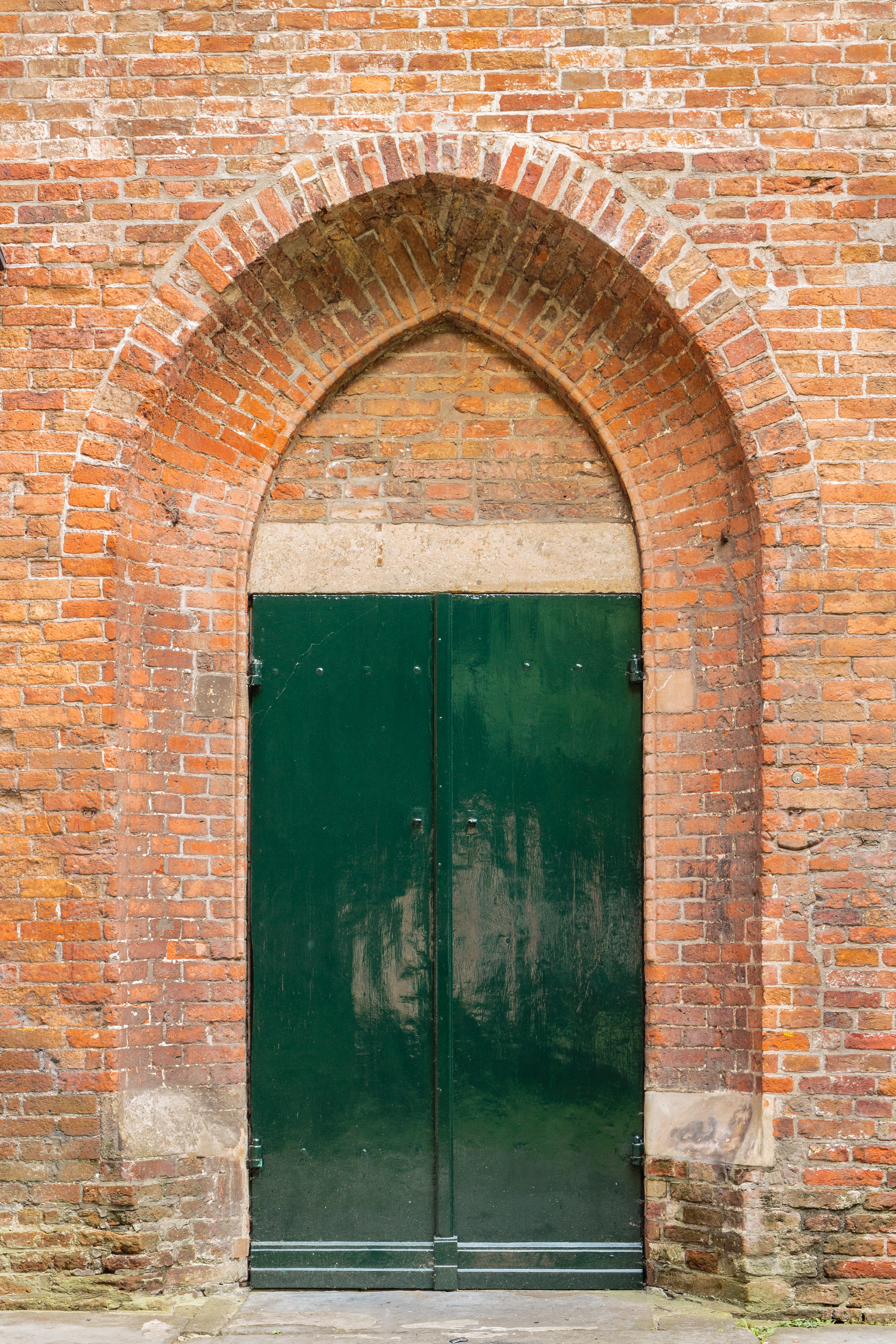
Side entrance in a masonry arch.

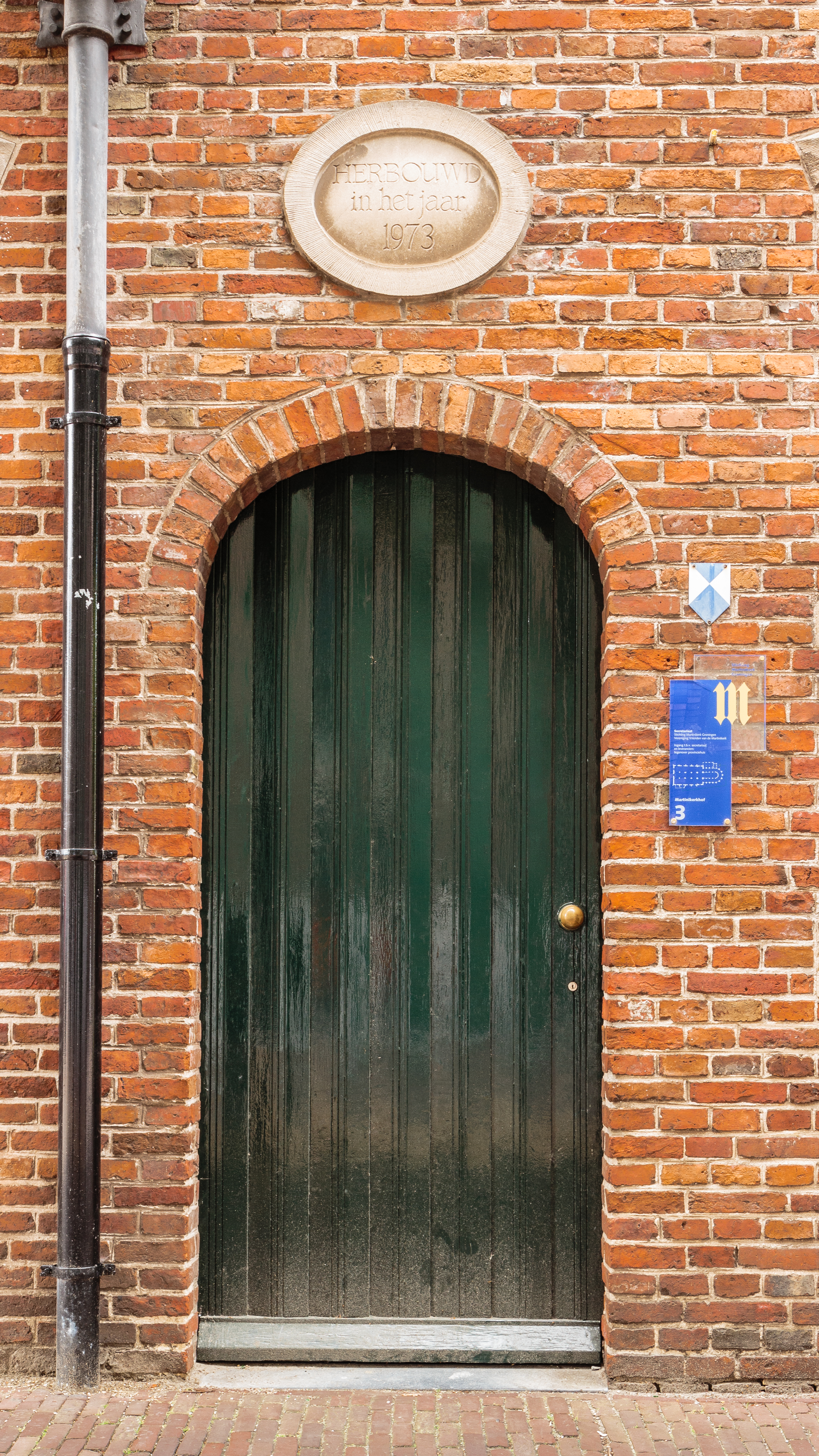
Entrance to the Martinikerk secretariat.
