= Timeline of Groningen =

The following is a timeline of the history of the Netherlands' municipality of Groningen.

== Pre–19th century ==
- 48 CE: Roman camp established.
- 800: Martin's Church built (approximate date).
- 1040: "Villa Cruoninga" ("Groningen") mentioned.
- 13th century: Reitdiep canal dug
- c. 1220: Martin's Church rebuilt in brick
- 1255: City wall built
- 1284: Groningen joins the Hanseatic League
- c. 1300: Town hall built
- 1308: Jacobijnerklooster established
- 1482: Martin's Church tower built
- 1493: Der Aa Church built
- 1506: Edzard I, Count of East Frisia, in power
- 1509: Ommelanderhuis and Rechthuis built
- 1526: Guild unrest
- 1575: Ommelanden secedes from city
- 1579: City signs Union of Utrecht regional treaty
- 1580: Siege of Groningen; Spaniards in power
- May–July 1594: Siege of Groningen; Maurice, Prince of Orange, and William Louis, Count of Nassau-Dillenburg, in power; Groningen Treaty of Reduction unites city and Ommelanden
- 17 February 1595: City of Groningen and the Ommelanden admitted to the Republic of the United Netherlands
- 1599: orphanage founded.
- c. 1609: workhouse established
- 1614: University of Groningen founded
- 1615: University library established
- 1635: Goudkantoor built on the Grote Markt
- 1650: William Frederick, Prince of Nassau-Dietz, becomes stadtholder of Groningen
- 1659: Gerhard ten Berge becomes mayor
- 1662: City Weigh House built
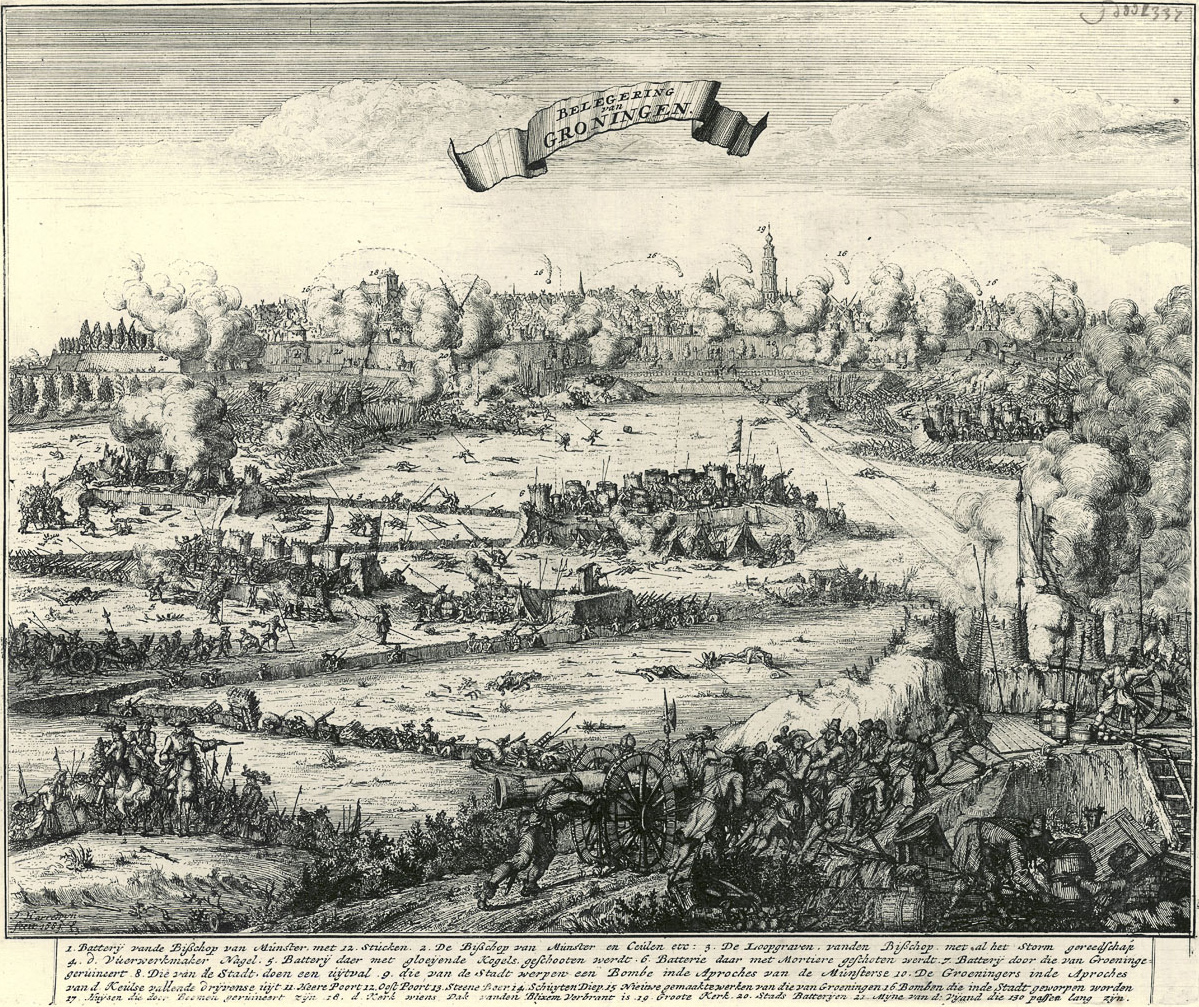
  Siege of Groningen by Bishop of Münster
- July–August 1672: Siege of Groningen by Bishop Christoph Bernhard von Galen of Münster on behalf of Louis XIV of France
- 1705: Allert Meijer becomes city architect
- 1728: Collegium Medicum founded
- 1747: Jodenkamp cemetery established
- 1756: Volteringstraat synagogue built
- 1790: Henri Daniel Guyot Institute for the deaf established
- 1798: Hotel De Doelen established

== 19th century ==
- 1801: Scientific Society of Groningen formed
- 1810: City Hall rebuilt
- 1811: Groningen becomes part of the Ems-Occidental department of the French Empire
- 1813: French military ousted
- 1815: Vindicat atque Polit established
- 1819: design of Coat of arms of Groningen adopted
- 1824: Jean François van Iddekinge becomes mayor
- 1830: Academy of Fine Arts established
- 1837: annual Groningsche Volksalmanak begins publication
- 1841: Hoofdwacht on the Grote Markt in use
- 1847: Praedinius Gymnasium active
- 1865: Noord-Willems Canal dug
- 1865: Korenbeurs rebuilt
- 1866: population: 36,852
- 1868: Nieuwe Groninger Nieuwsblad begins publication
- 1870: Meppel–Groningen railway begins operations
- 1874: Groninger Museum established
- 1874: Fortress demolished
- 1876: Eems Canal dug
- 1879: Verbindingskanaal dug
- 1879: design of the Flag of Groningen adopted
- 1880: Horse-drawn tram begins operating
- 1881: Scholtenhuis built
- 1882: Groningen State Archives established
- 1883: Groningen City Theatre established
- 1884: Groningen–Delfzijl railway begins operating; Groningen Noord railway station opens
- 1887: Groningen Local Railway Company established
- 1888: Nieuwsblad van het Noorden begins publication
- 1888: Hooghoudt distillery established
- 1894: Peace society formed
- 1895: Broerkerk demolished; Catholic St. Martinuskerk built
- 1896: Groningen railway station built

== 20th century ==
- 1903: World exhibit held
- 1904: Huis de Beurs café built
- 1906: Gemeentetram Groningen transit entity established
- 1906: Groningen Synagogue built
- 1909: University Academics Facility built
- 1910: electric tram begins operating
- 1918: De Ploeg art group formed
- 1919: Gorecht Canal dug
- 1919: population: 89,030
- 1929: Grand Theatre built
- 1931: Hakenkampsveld Airport established outside city limits
- 1933: Oosterpark Stadion opens
- 26 July 1940: mistakenly bombarded by Allied forces
- 26–27 September 1941: mistakenly bombarded by Allied forces
- April 1945: Battle of Groningen
- 1946: Groningen chess tournament held
- 1950: Design of the Flag of Groningen adopted
- 1951: Jan Tuin becomes mayor
- 1955: Roman Catholic Diocese of Groningen established
- 1959: Groningen gas field discovered
- 1960: Camera Cinema opens
- 1962: Nieuwe Stadhuis built
- 1969: increase in municipality size
- 1969: Lauwers Lake created near city
- 1970: Zernikecomplex development begins
- 1971: Football Club Groningen established
- 1971: Harm Buiter becomes mayor
- 1973: Eemshaven seaport opens
- 1974: Groningen Noord railway station rebuilt
- 1977: Groningen traffic circulation plan implemented
- 1979: RKZ Cinema opens
- 1986: Hanze University of Applied Sciences established
- 1991: Muller restaurant established
- 1991: Hans Ouwerkerk becomes mayor
- 1992: Groninger Dagblad begins publication
- 1992: Groninger Kredietbank scandal
- 1992: Groningen Audio Visual Archive established
- 1993: European Association for Sport Management headquartered in Groningen
- 1996: New City Hall building demolished
- 1996: Eurosonic Festival commences
- 1998: Jacques Wallage becomes mayor
- 1998: Urban renewal efforts

== 21st century ==
- 2002: Dagblad van het Noorden founded
- 2002: Groninger Archives established
- 2004: Nederlands Stripmuseum established
- 2005: University Medical Center Groningen established
- 2006: Euroborg stadium established
- 2007: Groningen Europapark railway station begins operating
- 2011: construction on the Groninger Forum begins
- 2014: Infoversum cinema built
- 2014: population: 197,823
- 2015: Peter den Oudsten becomes mayor.

== See also ==
- History of Groningen

== Bibliography ==
- Thomas Nugent (1749), "Groningen", The Grand Tour, vol. 1: Netherlands, London: S. Birt, hdl:2027/mdp.39015030762598
- "Groningen". Gazetteer of the Netherlands. Attributed to Clement Cruttwell. London: G.G.J. and J. Robinson. 1794.
- William Henry Overall, ed. (1870). "Groningen". Dictionary of Chronology. London: William Tegg. hdl:2027/uc2.ark:/13960/t9m32q949.
- George Henry Townsend (1877), "Groningen", A Manual of Dates (5th ed.), London: Frederick Warne & Co., hdl:2027/hvd.32044088047865
- "Groningen (city)". Chambers's Encyclopaedia. London. 1901. hdl:2027/uc2.ark:/13960/t1fj2r624.
- "Groningen", Belgium and Holland (15th ed.), Leipzig: Karl Baedeker, 1910, hdl:2027/uc1.b3129294
- "Groningen (town)" . Encyclopædia Britannica. Vol. 12 (11th ed.). 1911. pp. 613–614.
- "Groningen (province)" . Encyclopædia Britannica. Vol. 12 (11th ed.). 1911. pp. 612–613.
- Evert Jan Diest Lorgion. Geschiedkundige beschrijving der stad Groningen [Historical description of the city of Groningen] (in Dutch). Groningen: Roelfsema. 1852-1857
- Henri Zondervan, ed. (1917), "Groningen", Winkler Prins' Geillustreerde Encyclopaedie (in Dutch), vol. 8 (4th ed.), Amsterdam: Uitgevers-Maatschappy Elsevier, hdl:2027/mdp.39015068347981 (province and city)
- G. van Herwijnen, ed. (1978). "Groningen". Bibliografie van de stedengeschiedenis van Nederland [Bibliography of Urban History in the Netherlands] (in Dutch). Brill. pp. 26+. ISBN 90-04-05700-5.
- Jan Van den Broek (2007). Groningen, een stad apart: over het verleden van een eigenzinnige stad (1000-1600) (in Dutch). Van Gorcum. ISBN 978-90-232-4323-6.
