= Stef Tuinstra =

Dutch organist (born 1954)

Stef Tuinstra (born 4 May 1954) is a Dutch organist, organ expert and author.

== Life ==
Born in Groningen, Tuinstra grew up in a musical family. His father was an orchestra musician from Friesland, his mother an amateur singer, his brother Luuk played trombone in radio orchestras for years. Tuinstra received piano lessons at the age of six, trombone lessons at nine and organ lessons from the age of fourteen.

Tuinstra studied organ at the Prins Claus Conservatory in Groningen with Wim van Beek (1930-2017) and completed his master's degree cum laude. Minor subjects were piano and trombone; he also had harpsichord lessons. Tuinstra studied with Gustav Leonhardt and deepened his skills in master classes with Luigi Ferdinando Tagliavini, Ton Koopman and Harald Vogel. He was introduced as organ expert by Klaas Bolt. In 1978, he graduated in choral conducting and church music. One year later he won the Prix D'Exellence and in 1980 the Choral Prize at the National Improvisation Competition in Bolsward and in 1986 the International Harpsichord Competition in Bruges.

As an organ expert Tuinstra works together with the Protestant Church in the Netherlands and the "Rijksdienst voor het Cultureel Erfgoed". He has supervised more than 140 new organ constructions and restoration projects, including Arp Schnitger's Orgel der Dorpskerk Mensingeweer and his Organ in the Aa-kerk in Groningen.

Since 1973, he has been cantor organist in Zeerijp. In 1978, Tuinstra founded the chamber choir Musica Retorica, which he conducted until 1993. In 1992, he founded the North Netherlands Organ Academy, which he has directed ever since. In the same year he became organist at the Nieuwe Kerk in Groningen with its classical organ by Johannes Wilhelmus Timpe (1831). Since 2017, he has shared with Sietze de Vries the organist position at Martinikerk, which Wim van Beek had previously held for 60 years. There is one of the most famous baroque organs of Northern Europe, which was given its definitive shape in 1692 by Arp Schnitger.

Tuinstra regularly gives concerts, which he enriches with improvisations in various styles from Renaissance to modern music. His master classes are held in Europe, Japan and the U.S.A. Two of his CD recordings have been awarded the Edison Prize. A special role is played by his recording of the complete works of Georg Böhm for organ and harpsichord. Tuinstra is a representative of the historically informed performance, in which the rhetoric and emotional content of the works determine the interpretation. On the basis of continuo playing with improvisatory elements, the aim is to achieve orchestral organ playing.

Tuinstra lives in Bedum, not far from Groningen, and has two daughters. His daughter Gerdine Tuinstra studied singing at the Prins Claus Conservatory and occasionally performs as a soprano together with her father.

== Publications ==
- "Versuch einer Rekonstruktion von Bachs Pedaltechnik". In Musik und Gottesdienst, vol. 68, 2014, ISSN 1015-6798, pp. 173–180 (part 1); vol. 69, 2015, pp. 15–29 (part 2)
- Georg Böhm, Booklet zur CD-Gesamteinspielung, 2011 (PDF-Datei; 7,2–MB)
- "Arp Schnitger – auf der Suche nach dem authentischen Klang". Basler Jahrbuch für historische Musikpraxis. Vol. 22/1998. Winterthur: Amadeus Verlag. 1999. pp. 157–178. OCLC 882621030.
- "An Wasserflüssen Babylon – Johann Adam Reincken – Een Noord-Duitse Koraalfantasie als 'Orgel oratorium'", Het Orgel, 94, nr. 2, 1998, pp. 6–14.
- "Schnitger, Europese orgelbouwer van verleden en heden", Het Orgel, 94, nr. 4, 1998, 34–42.
- "Marten Eertman, orgelmaker op de grens tussen kunst en kitsch", Groninger Kerken, vol. 13, nr. 2, June 1996, pp. 52–54.
- "Groningen, Province of organs", The Organ Yearbook, 25, 1995, pp. 49–100.
- with Harald Vogel; Reinhard Ruge (1992). Wegweiser zu den Orgeln der Ems-Dollart-Region (2nd ed.). Leer: Rautenberg.
- "Twee Schnitgerorgels gerehabiliteerd". Het Orgel 85, April 1989, pp. 170–184.
- "Het Schnitger-Wenthinorgel te Weener (Ostfriesland)". Het Orgel. 81 (1): 292–299. 1985.

=== Recordings ===
- Georg Böhm: Keyboard Works 3 CDs. NNOA. 2011 (Organs in Hamburg/Jacobi and Midwolda, also harpsichord).
- Jan Pieterszoon Sweelinck: The complete keyboard works 9 CDs. 1999–2001 (different interpreters).
- Bach in Midwolda: Stef Tuinstra bespeelt het Hinsz orgel NNOA. 2000 (BWV 541, 562, 593, 646, 647, 659–661, 680, 768)
- Nordniederländische Orgelkunst CD Coronata, COR 1217 (Organ in Zeerijp, with Harry Geraerts, tenor).
- Die Norddeutsche Kunst des Orgelchorals des 17. Jahrhunderts. 2 CD. NNOA. 1991 (Organ in Norden, works by S. Scheidt, F. Tunder, D. Strunck, J.A. Reincken and D. Buxtehude).
- Orgelhistorie in Groningen 3 CDs. Syncoop 5751 CD 114. 1990 (different interpreters)
- Arp Schnitger in Groningen. Lindenberg LBCD15. 1990. (Organ in Groningen/Aa-kerk: Works by F. Tunder, V. Lübeck, J. Pachelbel, J.S. Bach, K. Bolt; Bernard Winsemius: Works by J.N. Hanff, V. Lübeck, J.S. Bach).
- Arp Schnitger in Groningen. Lindenberg LBCD12. 1989. (Organ in Eenum: works by Anonymus, G. Böhm, J. Pachelbel, J. A. Reincken, M. Weckmann, J.S. Bach; Harald Vogel in Godlinze: works by G.F. Handel, J. Mattheson, J.S. Bach).
