= Organ in the Aa-kerk in Groningen =

Historic organ in Groningen, Netherlands

Coordinates: 53°12′59″N 6°33′44″E

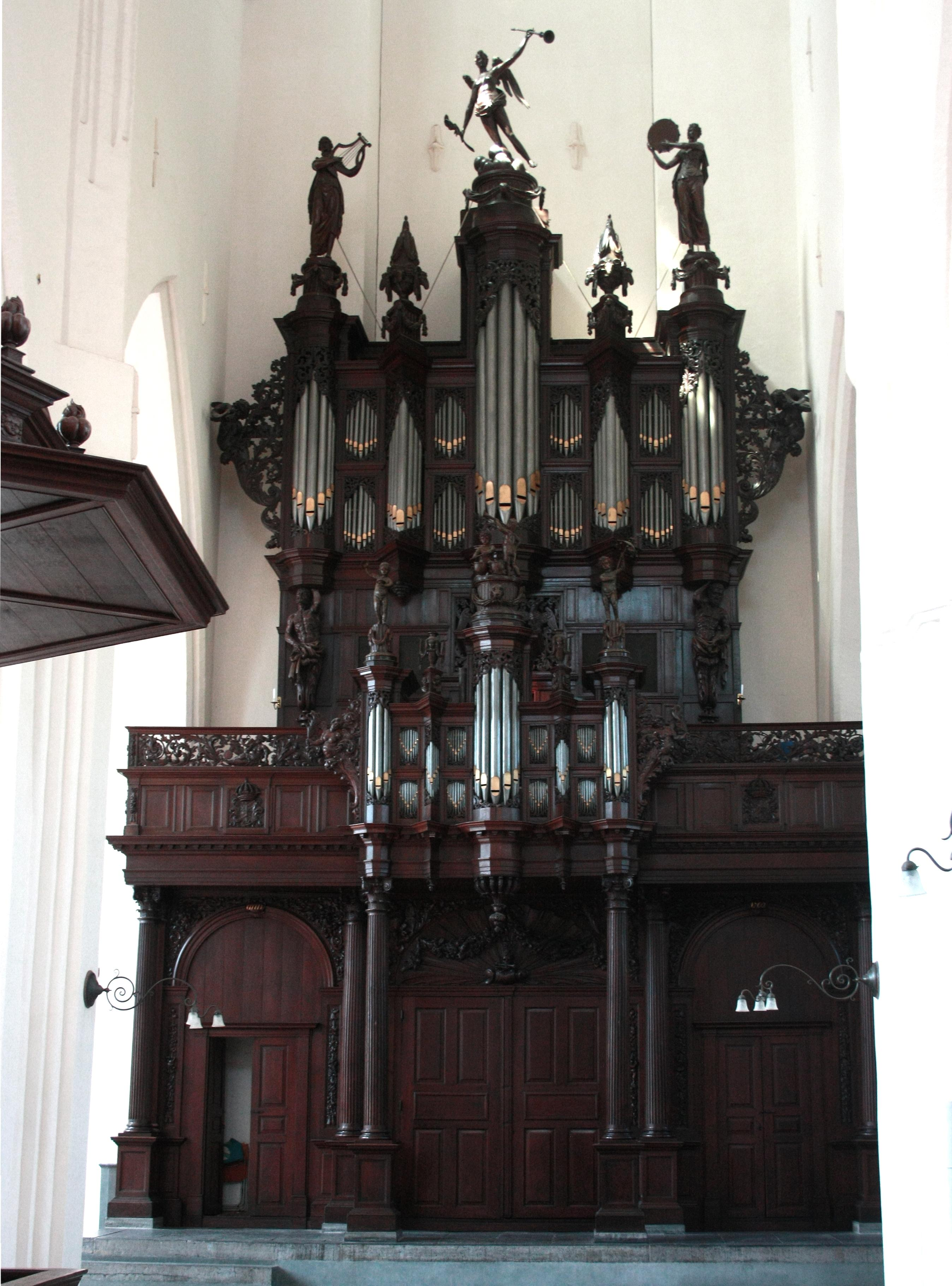
The Arp Schnitger Organ in the Aa-kerk in Groningen

The west gallery organ in the Aa-kerk in Groningen was built by Arp Schnitger in 1699–1702. Originally built for the Academiekerk in Groningen it was moved to the Aa-kerk in 1815. Today it has 40 stops on three manuals and pedal, and is a monument of European significance.

== Building History ==
=== Predecessor ===
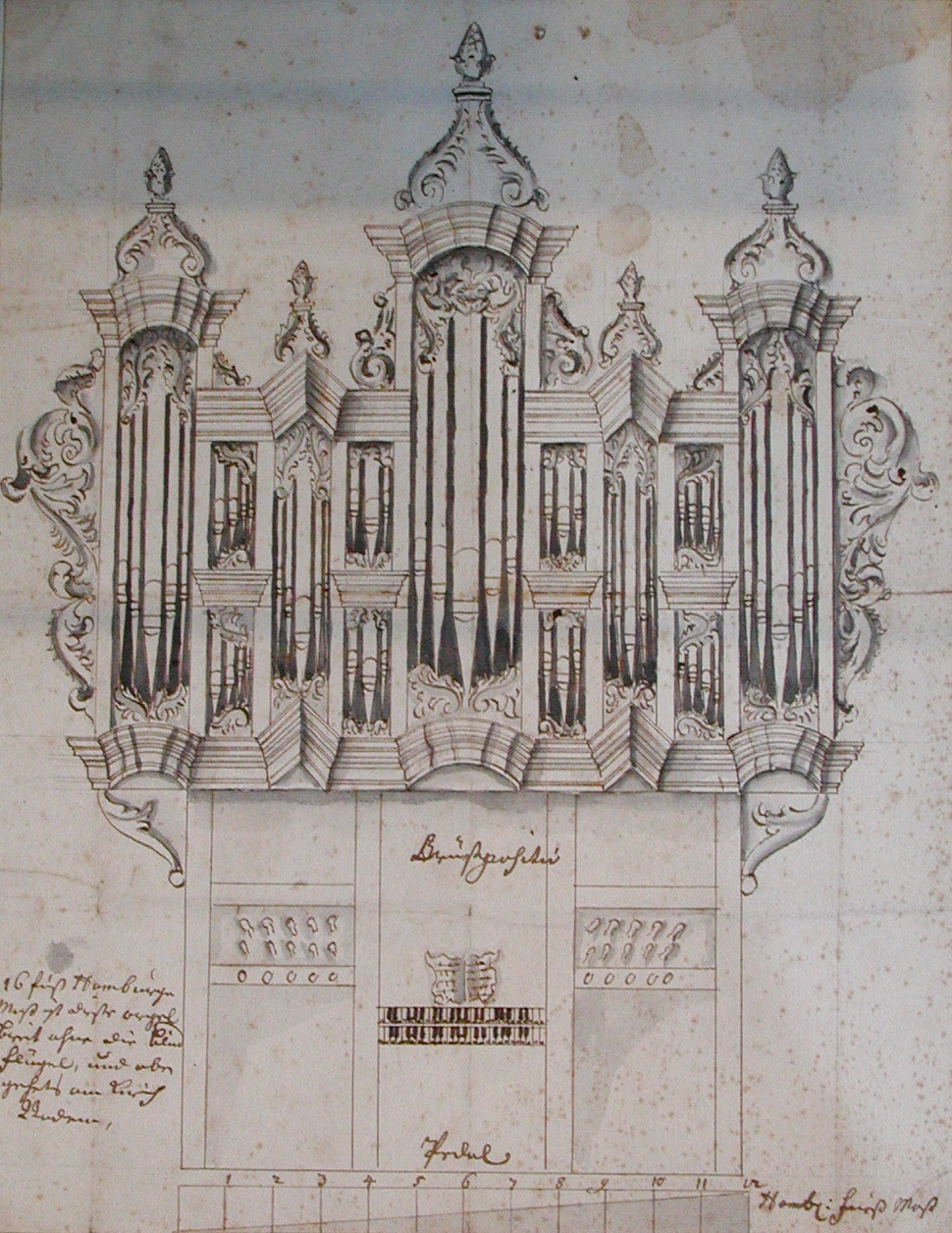
Schnitger's sketch of the organ for the Academiekerk

The Der Aa-kerk in Groningen in the Netherlands was built in its current cruciform shape in the late Gothic period, and was named after the neighboring river Aa.

In 1475 an organ was built on the eastern wall of the south transept, rebuilt in 1558 by Andreas de Mare I. 1654 Theodorus Faber was commissioned, with Andreas de Mare II (whose relationship to the organ builder of the same name from the 16th century is not yet clear), to build a large new organ on the west wall, but Faber could not complete it before his death in 1659. Jacobus Galtus Hagerbeer completed this large instrument in 1667; it had 40 stops on three manuals and pedal. In 1671 this organ fell victim to a fire. Arp Schnitger built a new organ for the Aa-Kerk in 1694–97, his largest organ in the Netherlands; this was lavishly appointed and had over 40 stops on four manuals and pedal. For example, the facade pipes were made of pure East Indian tin and the bass octave had all twelve semitones. Schnitger himself wrote of this organ: "I did not spare anything and made everything wonderful; I provided, beyond the contract, 6 stops on a special windchest, and this organ still deserves a little more." This organ was destroyed in 1710 by the collapse of the tower. Only the original Schnitger sketch has survived. For about a hundred years, the church had to do without organ accompaniment.

=== New organ for the Academiekerk by Schnitger 1702 ===
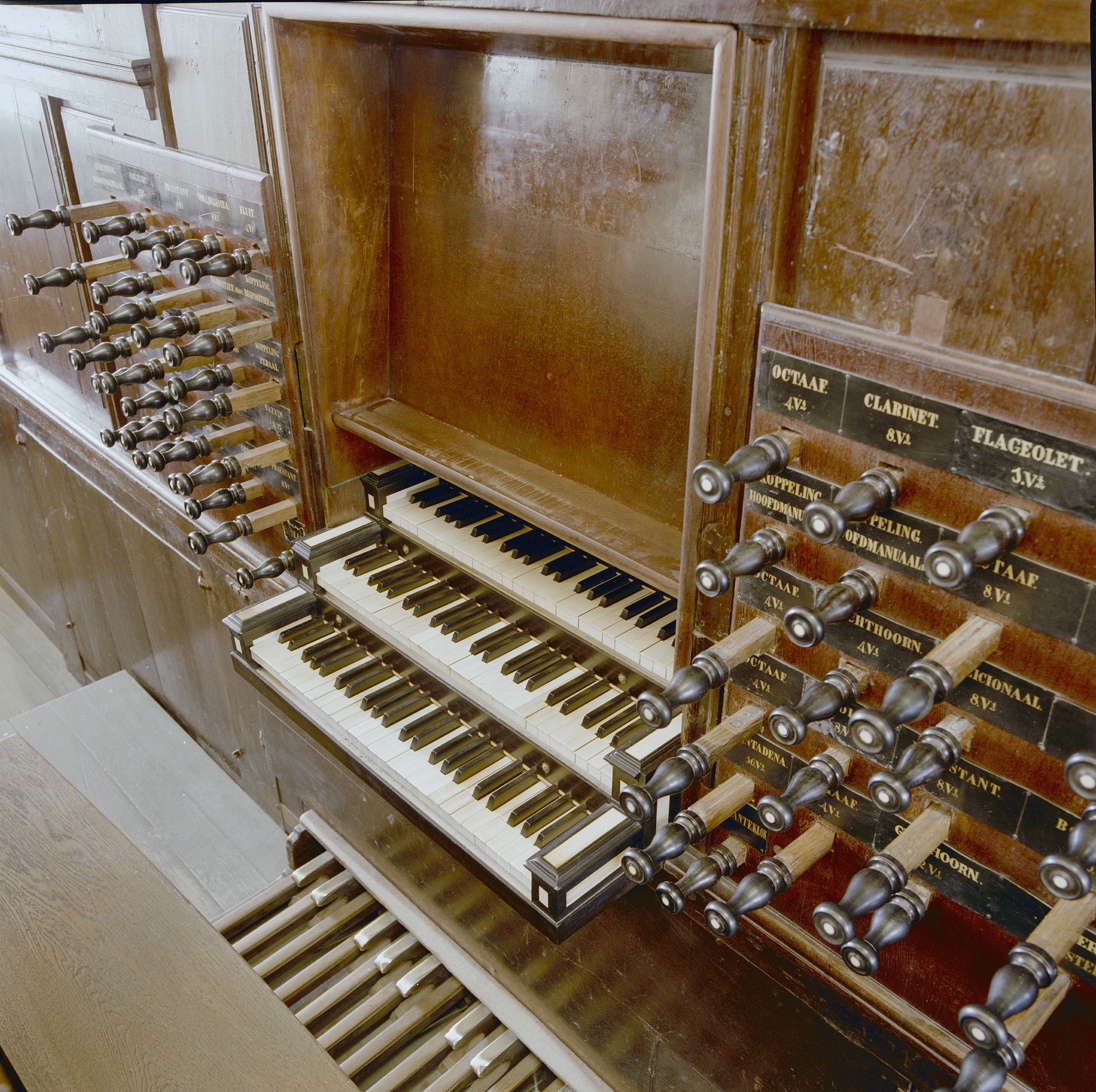
Organ console

When the Academiekerk (University Church) in Groningen was given to the Roman Catholic community in 1814, its organ was donated to the Aa-Kerk thanks to a donation from King William I. Schnitger had built this organ in 1699–1702, using several stops from the previous organ in the Academiekerk. The previous organ had been built by Hendrick Harmens van Loon and Andreas de Mare II in 1679, a large organ with 32 stops on three manuals and pedal; this in turn had re-used material from an even older organ. The case for the new organ was made by Allert Meijer and by Schnitger and the carving was by Jan de Rijk.

Nicolaas Arnoldi Knock recorded the disposition of the Schnitger organ in the Academiekerk in 1788, reflecting the situation after work by Hinsz in 1784 (Knock's disposition is missing the Octaaf 4′ in the Rug-Positief):

I Rug-Positief CDEFGA–c^{3}
Praestant	8′
Quintadena	16′
Gedakt	8′
Fluit	4′
Fluit	2′
Quint	1 1/2′
Sexquialter
Scherp IV
Dulciaan	8′

II Manuaal CDEFGA–c^{3}
Praestant	16′
Holpyp	8′
Octaaf	4′
Quint	3′
Octaaf	2′
Mixtuur IV–VI
Trompet	8′
Voxhumana	8′

III Borstwerk CDEFGA–c^{3}
Gedakt	8′
Fluit	4′
Octaaf	2′
Quint	1 1/2′
Sexquialter
Scherp IV

Pedaal CDE–d^{1}
Praestant	8′
Bourdon	16′
Octaaf	4′
Mixtuur IV–VI
Bazuin	16′
Trompet	8′
Trompet	4′
Cornet	2′

- Couplers: I/II, III/II
- 2 tremulants, exhaust valve, 4 ventils controlling the wind supply to chests
- 6 bellows (by Schnitger)

The Rugpositief case reflects the main case in scaled-down form. Both cases are nine-part facades with an elevated polygonal central tower, medium-sized polygonal outer towers and low pointed towers in between. Four two-storey pipe-flats, divided by intermediate cornices, connect the towers and align horizontally with the pointed towers. The carving consists of acanthus leaves with volutes. The carved side-wings of the Rug-Positief case feature angels with palm branches; the angels in the carved side-wings of the main case play musical instruments. The Borstwerk doors have openwork acanthus carving and feature two double-headed eagles from the Groningen coat of arms.

The 103 case-pipes of the Rug-Positief and 91 of the main case have a tin content of about 90% and have semicircular gilded lips. It is the largest stock of original tin case-pipes in a Schnitger organ.

Matthias Amoor (a builder of the Schnitger school) repaired the organ in 1728 and 1738. In 1754 Albertus Antonius Hinsz added a Hoofdmanuaal-to-Rugpositief coupler, and carried out repairs in 1761 and 1784.

=== Transfer to the Aa-kerk (Timpe 1815–16) ===
Johannes Wilhelmus Timpe (an organ builder from Groningen) transferred the organ to the Aa-Kerk in 1815–16 and adapted it to the new location. The gallery (brought from the Academiekerk) had to be redesigned, and also the wide entrance-portal below, with its three double-winged doors under round arches, made by furniture-maker (and later city master-builder) Allert Meijer, who created Schnitger's organ cases in the Groningen area. Since then these doors, originally used by professors for academic purposes, have served only as access to the organ. It is possible that the two pillars below the Rug-Positief were added in 1702, as the composite capitals are slightly different from the four pillars on the portal wall. Because the six wedge bellows were placed behind the organ, and because the gallery is less deep than in the original location, the space for the organist between the console and Rugpositief was significantly reduced.

The portal, gallery and organ case are made of oak, finished with brown varnish. The portal wall is divided by four fluted columns. The gallery fronts have four profiled panels on each side and the carved Groningen coat of arms in the middle. Open-work carving with volutes, tendrils and figures with musical instruments forms the gallery edge. During the conversion, classical figures were carved on the manual cases and below the pedal tower by Anthonie Wallis, and the main case widened below impost level to the dimensions of the upper case. Four music-making cherubs from 1815 crown the Rug-Positief and female figures and angels with musical instruments top the main case. Wallis also replaced the original carvings beneath the side towers of the main case with two near-life-size figures of Atlas.

=== Later work ===
In 1830–31, Timpe rebuilt the Borstwerk into a Bovenwerk and rebuilt or renewed several stops. In 1856–58 the instrument was remodeled by Petrus van Oeckelen of Groningen, and adapted to the taste of the time by enlarging the Hoofdmanuaal from 9 to 13 stops on new windchests, adding three more stops to the pedal in the lower case, and adding the missing C sharp and D sharp to the bass octave. Additional chests were added and the pedal Mixture removed. Van Oeckelen renewed the keyboards and most of the key- and stop-action. The bellows were housed in the tower. In 1919, Jan Doornbos replaced the six wedge bellows with a magazine bellows. In 1924, he built a swell-box for the Bovenwerk and added a Voix Céleste on a pneumatic chest. From the 1930s to the 1950s, some old stops were replaced by Klaas Doornbos (1935, 1939, 1946, 1952).

=== Restoration ===
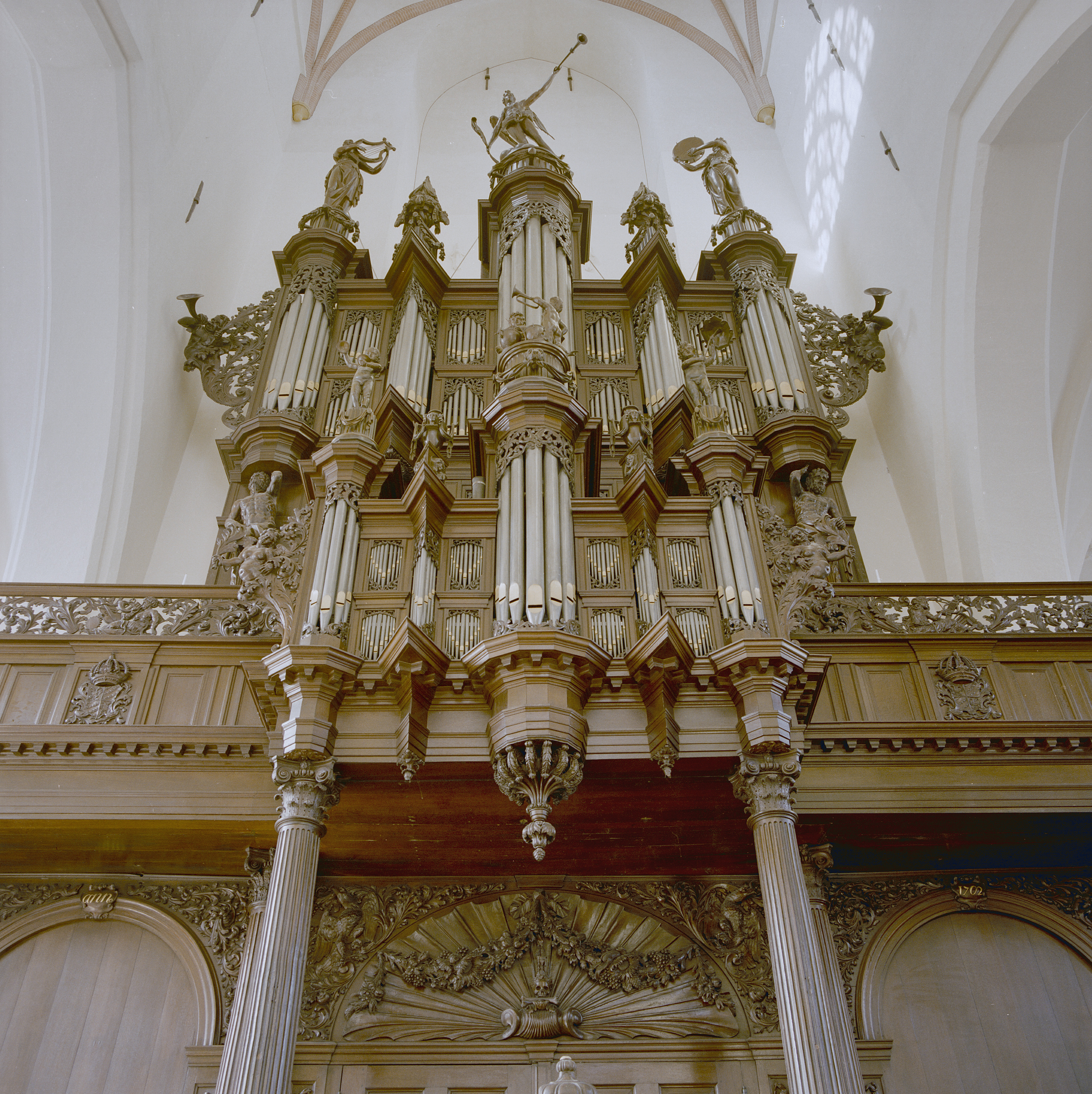
Perspective from below (1992)

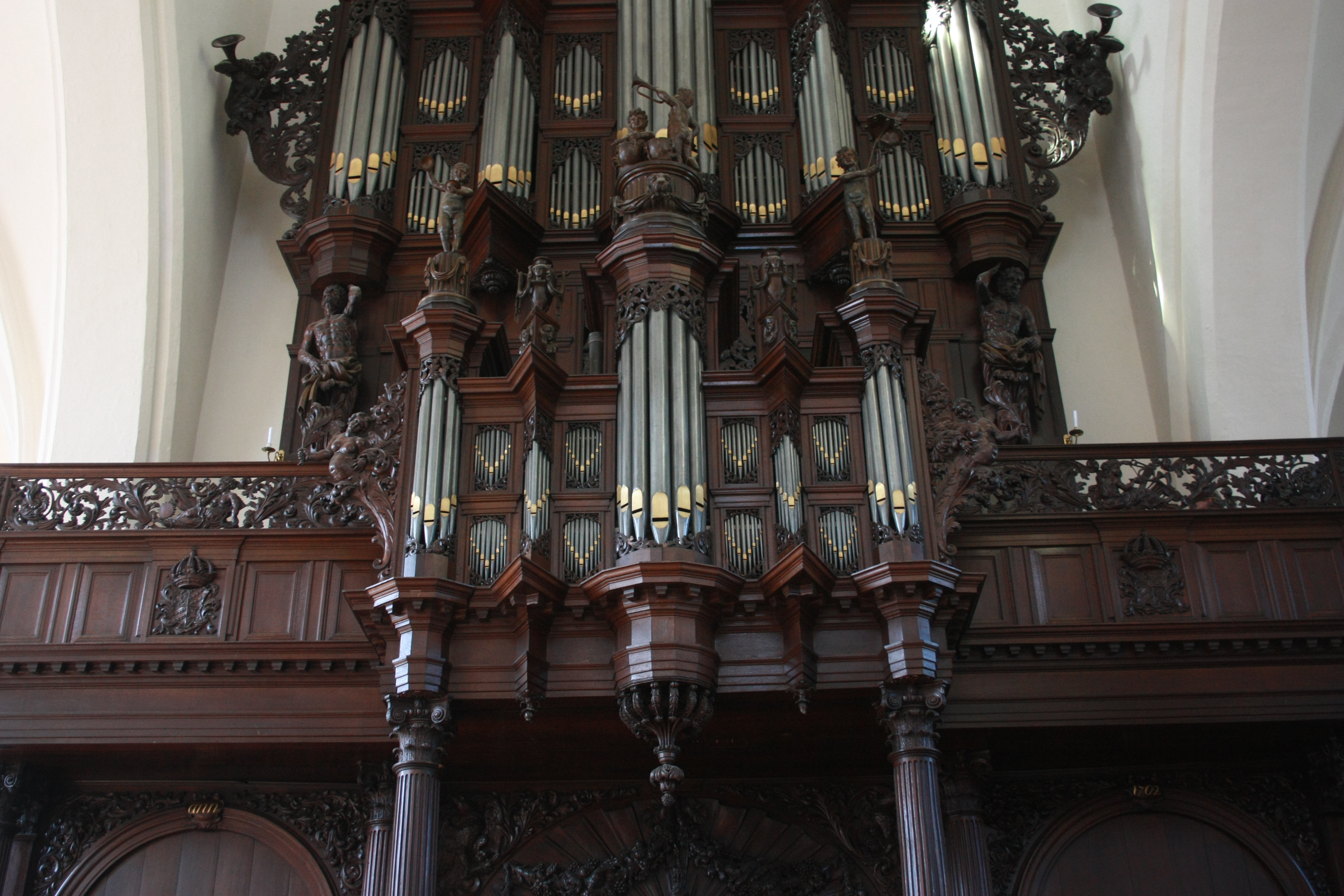
Schnitger organ after the restoration (2013)

In 1977, works to the organ were tendered for when the church restoration began. In 1990 the organ was partly restored and rebuilt by the Reil firm of Heerde, including Schnitger's wind-chests. Klaas Bolt, Harald Vogel and Stef Tuinstra supervised these works as organ experts.

The expert Rudi van Straeten created a restoration proposal in 1993, using the state of 1858 as a base, but with some technical improvements. There was a controversial discussion on whether the surviving state of the organ should be changed, or maintained as a grown condition. Two arguments were made strongly for maintaining the grown state: first, there was no serious structural instability (which had been feared), and second, the special sound qualities of the instrument as extant should not be lost.

This year-long dispute was officially settled in 2002 in favour of preservation of the present state. From 1998 to 2011, Reil carried out technical maintenance and conservation consolidation, without interfering with the substance as found. Reil designed a new, static tremulant, modelled after Timpe, and re-instated the bass pipes of the Bourdon. Some pipes from 1952 in the Rug-positief Scherp and Sifflet were replaced, and the 1924 swell-box was removed. The only stop that Reil reconstructed was the pedal Posaune using Schnitger models, since the Posaune provided in 1935 on a pneumatic auxiliary chest in modern style did not sound satisfactory.

The re-inauguration of the organ took place on 14 October 2011. Organ concerts, exhibitions, a symposium and the publication of a Festschrift (commemorative publication) underlined the special significance of this instrument.

== Significance ==
The organ is one of the Dutch Rijksmonumente (state monuments). It is considered one of the most important Baroque organs in northern Europe, and with its old stops and with the acoustics of the gothic church inspires universal high-regard from organ connoisseurs worldwide. The organ is praised for its singing Praestants with their subtle response, its colourful flutes, and rich-toned reeds that enable a wide variety of combinations. More than half of the stops survive from Schnitger's work, or from the previous organ of de Mare. Due to the many modifications, the organ has an organically grown condition, with elements from different eras.

In Groningen, as well as the Martinikerk (1692) and the Aa-Kerk (1694) Schnitger also built organs for the Pelstergasthuiskerk (1693), the Lutherse Kerk (1699) and the Academiekerk (1702), so that in the city at one time there was a four-manual Schnitger organ, two two- and three-manual organs and three one-manual organs. Groningen developed under Schnitger into a centre for the North Netherlands organ tradition. The Schnitger School was continued there by Albertus Antonius Hinsz, Heinrich Hermann Freytag, Frans Casper Snitger and Herman Eberhard Freytag, in great continuity, until 1863. Three of the Groningen church organs by Arp Schnitger survive today. The organ in the Pepergasthuiskerk, extended by Schnitger in 1697, was moved to Peize and still has some Schnitger stops. The instrument in the Lutherse Kerk was reconstructed in 2017 by Bernhardt Edskes. With its special qualities, the organ of the Aa-Kerk influenced a new generation of organists under its organist Johan van Meurs in the 1960s and 1970s, and played a significant role in the Schnitger renaissance in the Netherlands. Since the 1950s organ concerts, radio, television and LP recordings have been made of the organ in the Aa-Kerk; through these and through the Groningen Arp Schnitger Congress in 1969, the instrument has become very widely known.

== Disposition since 1990 ==
The organ currently has the following disposition:

I Rugpositief CDEFGA–c^{3}
Praestant	8′	S
Quintadena	16′	S
Gedekt	8′	S
Octaaf	4′	M
Roerfluit	4′	M
Gemshoorn	2′	S
Siflet	1 1/2′	M/T
Scherp IV–V		S/R
Trompet	8′	T
Dulciaan	8′	M/S

II Hoofdmanuaal C–c^{3}
Praestant	16′	S
Bourdon	16′	vO
Octaaf	8′	M
Holpijp	8′	M
Salicionaal	8′	vO
Octaaf	4′	M
Nachthoorn	4′	vO
Nasard	3′	D
Octaaf	2′	M/S
Cornet V D		vO
Mixtuur III–V		vO/D
Trompet	16′	vO
Trompet	8′	S

III Bovenwerk C–c^{3}
Praestant	8′	T/S
Viola di Gamba	8′	T
Holfluit	8′	T
Octaaf	4′	T/S
Fluit	4′	T
Fluit	2′	T
Flageolet	1′	D
Clarinet	8′	S/T/vO
Tremulant

Pedaal C–d^{1}
Praestant	8′	S
Bourdon	16′	M
Subbas	16′	vO
Quint	10 2/3′	vO
Holpijp	8′	vO/D
Octaaf	4′	M
Mixtuur		vakant
Bazuin	16′	R
Trompet	8′	S
Trompet	4′	S
Cornet	2′	vakant

- Couplers: I/II, III/II, I/P (van Oeckelen)
- Tremulant (Timpe)
- Calcant bell (van Oeckelen)

Abbreviations
M = Andreas de Mare II/Hendrick Hermann van Loon (1679)
S = Arp Schnitger (1699–1702)
T = Johann William Timpe (1830)
vO = Petrus van Oeckelen (1856–1858)
D = Jan and Klaas Doornbos (1919–1946)
R = Reil Brothers (1990/2011)

== Technical data ==
- 40 stops, 54 ranks of pipes
- 3 manuals and pedal
- Wind system:
  - 1 magazine bellow (Doornbos, 1920)
  - 4 Check valves
  - Wind pressure: 82,5 mmWS (2011)
- Windchests (Rugpositief: Schnitger, Hoofdmanuaal: van Oeckelen, Bovenwerk: Timpe, Pedaal: Schnitger/van Oeckelen)
- Mechanism/Action:
  - Keyboards (van Oeckelen)
  - Key action: Mechanical
  - Stop action: Mechanical
- Temperament:
  - Equal temperament
  - Pitch: a^{1} = 478 Hz
