= Nieuwe Kerk, Groningen =

Nieuwe Kerk
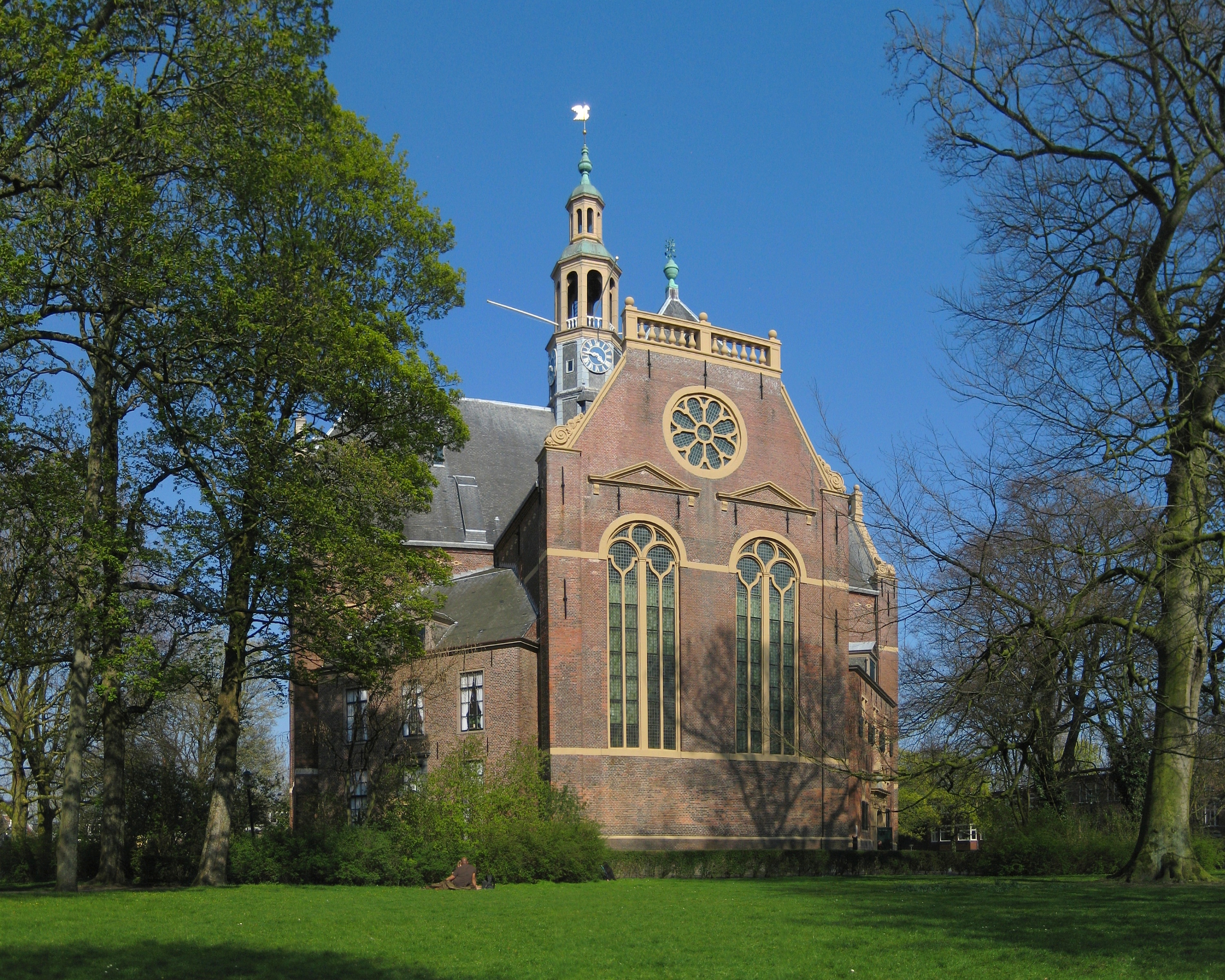
- Nieuwe Kerk
- Nieuwe Kerk
- 53°13′23″N 6°33′41″E
- Location: Nieuwe Kerkhof 1, Groningen, Groningen
- Country: Netherlands
- Denomination: Protestant Church in the Netherlands
- Website: www.nieuwekerkgroningen.nl

History
- Status: Active

Architecture
- Heritage designation: Rijksmonument (nr. 18583)
- Architect: Conraet Roeleffs
- Style: Neoclassicism
- Years built: 1660–1664

Specifications
- Capacity: 1,000

The Nieuwe Kerk (English: New Church), in the 18th century also called Noorderkerk, is a Protestant church in the city of Groningen, located on the Nieuwe Kerkhof in the Hortusbuurt.

The "new" in the name of the church is a reference to the "old" Sint-Walburgkerk. Originally the cemetery was called the Nieuwe Sint-Walburgkerkhof. The church is located on the northernmost hill of the Hondsrug; the Noordes or Tie (Thye).

== History ==
After the Siege of Groningen in 1594, plans quickly emerged to expand the city significantly. The first plans date from 1608, but due to other priorities and financial problems, the new fortifications were not completed until 1624. In 1623, the site was designated as a cemetery by city architect Garwer Peters. He designed the four entrance gates to the cemetery, which were later demolished, one of which can be seen in a drawing by Cornelis Pronk. In 1634, architect Johan Isenbrants, commissioned by the city council, designated part of the cemetery for the construction of a future church building. The funds were still insufficient and it would therefore take decades before construction plans could be started.

The new layout included a new church modeled on the Noorderkerk in Amsterdam. It is the first in Groningen built for Protestant worship (the Martinikerk and the Der Aa-kerk were originally Catholic churches). In 1660, the funds for the church were collected and construction could begin. The Nieuwe Kerk was designed by master Conraet Roeleffs and was built in Renaissance style with a floor plan in the shape of a Greek cross, crowned with a small crossing tower. Triangular houses were built in the corners, one of which is still inhabited by the sexton. Construction was completed in 1664.

There was already a cemetery on the new churchyard. In the past, plague victims were buried here, which was at that time still outside the city. The cemetery has now made way for a lawn with old maples and beeches.

== Organ ==
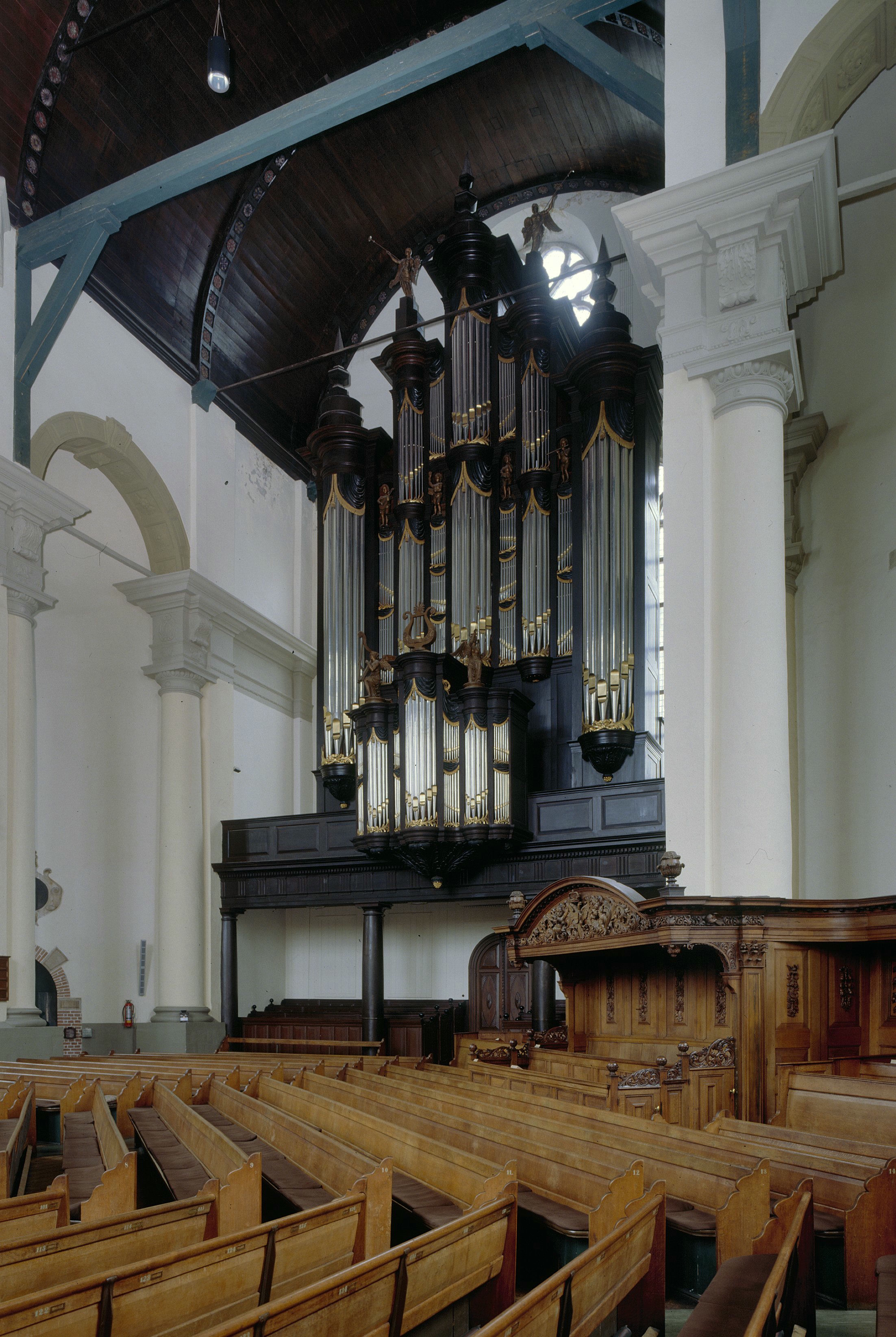
The organ in the Nieuwe Kerk

The organ in the Nieuwe Kerk was built in 1831 by Johannes Wilhelmus Timpe based on a design drawing by Petrus van Oeckelen. This is remarkable because Van Oeckelen probably learned the organ-building trade from Timpe. In designing the organ, Van Oeckelen was evidently inspired by the famous front of the main organ of the Grote Kerk in Haarlem by Christian Müller, judging by some of the details. Later, Van Oeckelen and J. Doornbos worked on the organ, whereby the disposition was slightly changed. In the period from 1976 to 1980, it was restored by the firm Ernst Leeflang. A second major restoration followed in 2008–2009. It has 42 registers, divided over main work, back positive, upper work, and pedal. It is located in the organ gallery on the west side of the cruciform church.

== Gallery ==
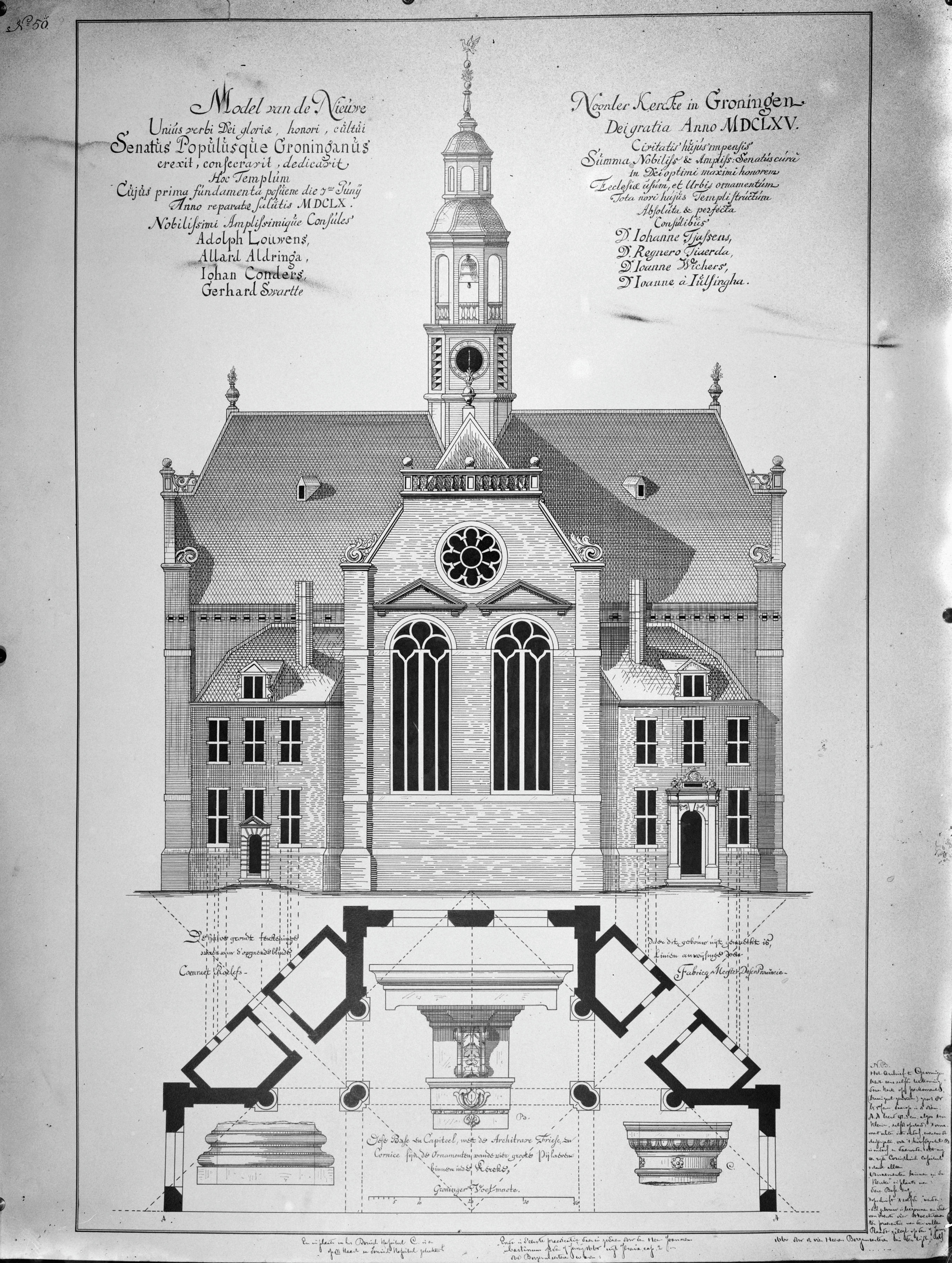
Design of the church

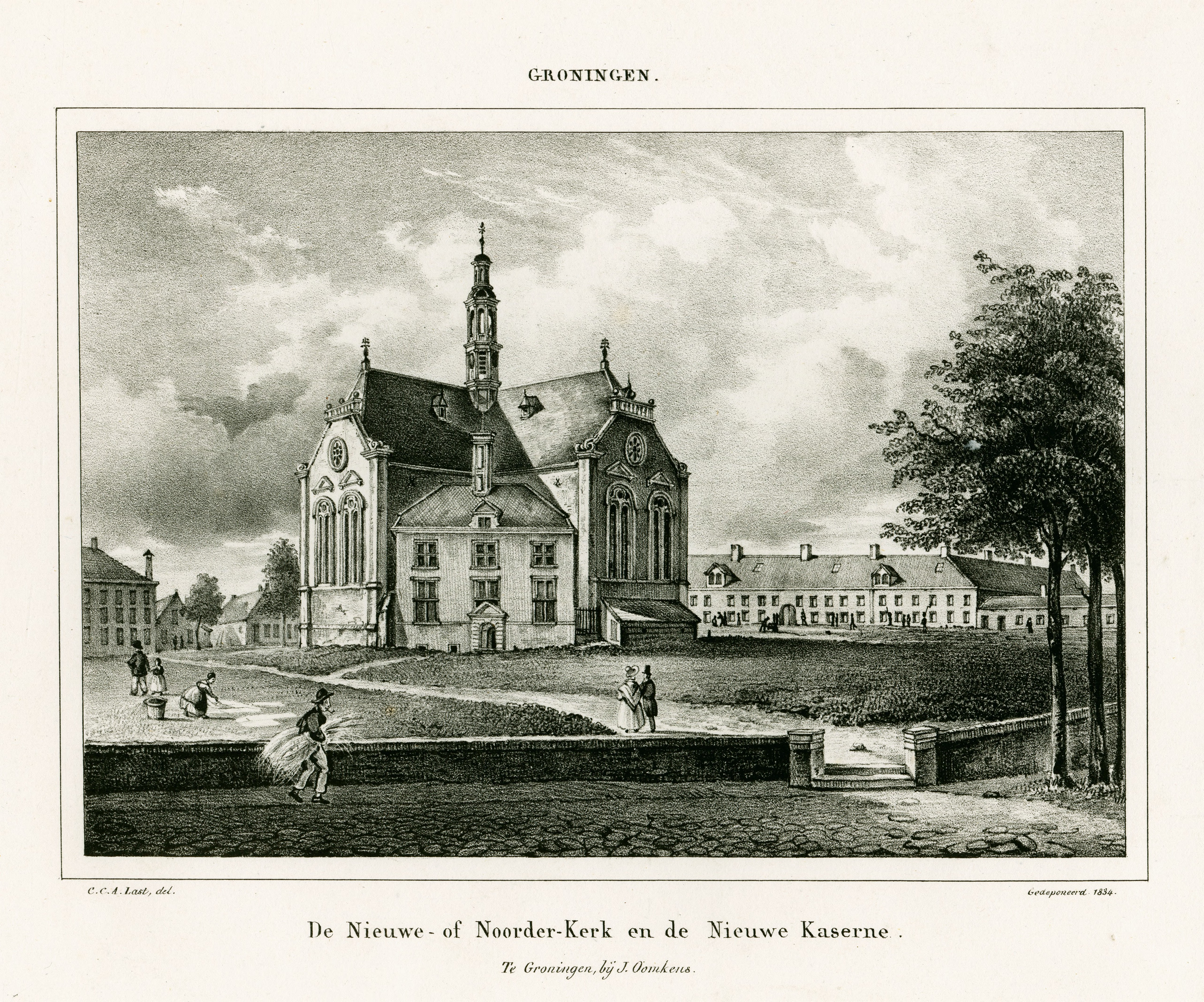
Drawing of the church, 1834

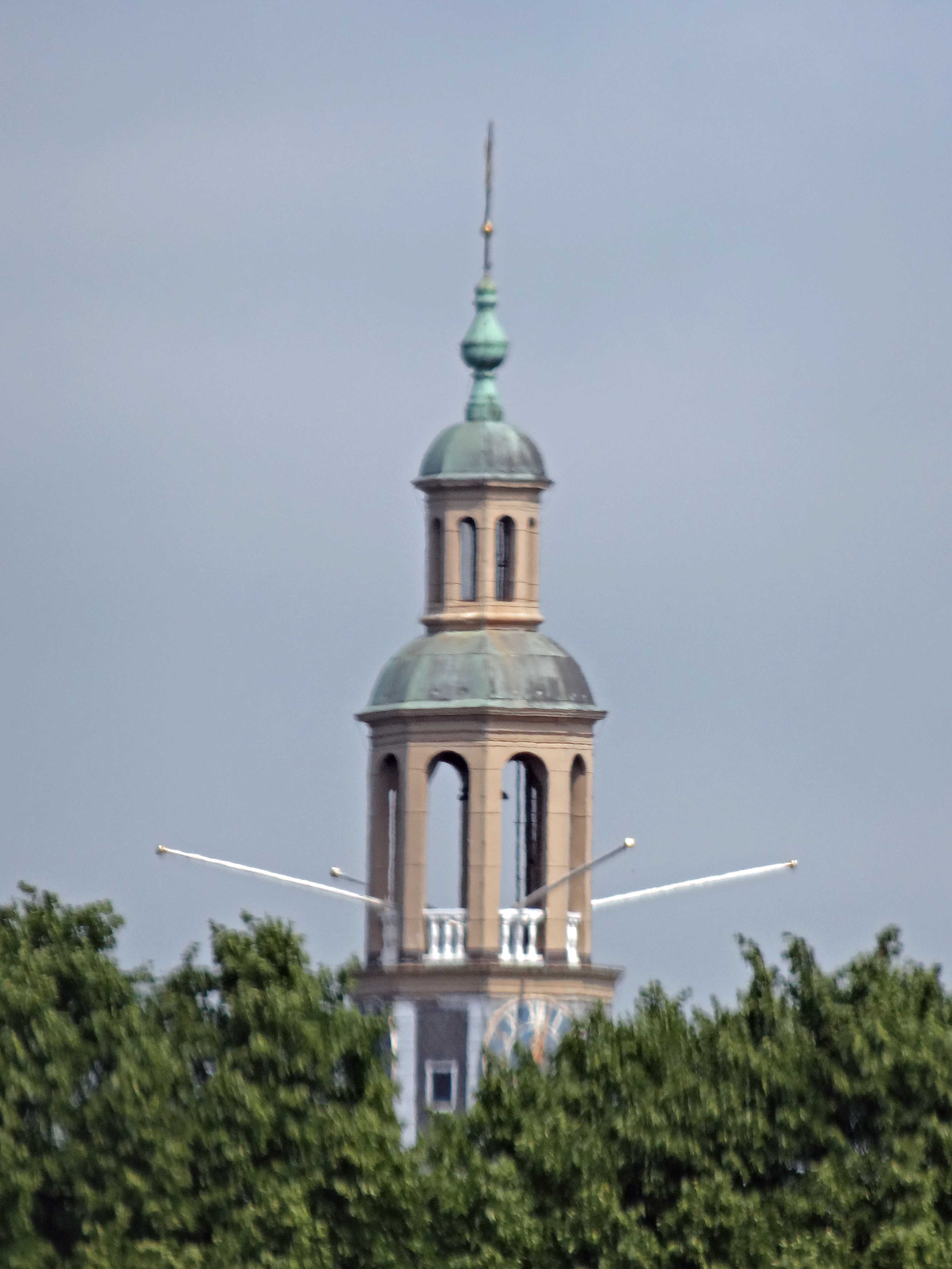
Spire
