= Friedhelm Flamme =

German organist, [choral director, musicologist, music educator

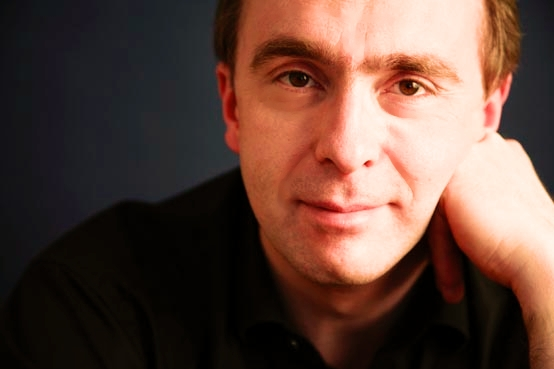
Friedhelm Flamme

Friedhelm Flamme (born 1963) is a German organist, choral director, musicologist, music educator.

== Life and achievements ==
Born in Volkmarsen, Flamme who has been associated with church music since his youth, was already active as an organist when he was young. He studied at the Hochschule für Musik Detmold and at the University of Paderborn school music, church music, organ (concert exam with distinction with Gerhard Weinberger), conducting, composition, educational science and theology. Further studies led him to Guy Bovet, Ewald Kooiman, Jon Laukvik, Thierry Mechler, Josef Mertin, Harald Vogel, Herbert Wulf and Wolfgang Zehrer.

Since 1991, he has been working as a church and school musician in the Sprengel Hildesheim-Göttingen and at the Paul-Gerhardt-Schule Dassel in the Evangelical-Lutheran Church of Hanover. From 1991 to 2004, he was cantor at the Laurentiuskirche Dassel, from 1991 to 2007 he was the church music supervisor in the Göttingen North district.

In 1993, he was appointed Kirchenmusikdirektor. Since 2002, he has been a lecturer at the Detmold University of Music. He has conducted a large number of vocal concerts, especially cyclic performances of Bach's oratorios with the Vokalensemble Südniedersachsen.

In 2006, he received his Ph.D. from the Musicological Institute of the Detmold University of Music and the University of Paderborn with a thesis on the compositional output of Friedrich Gulda. He published compositions and wind arrangements.

As an organist, Flamme gives concerts in Europe and overseas; he can rely to a broad repertoire and an extensive discography (Internet Classical Award 2004 for the recording of the complete organ works of Maurice Duruflé). Currently his CD series Organ Works of the North German Baroque (cpo/jpc) is widely acclaimed by critics and the public. The composer Walter Steffens wrote for Flamme his organ symphony Le Cantique des Cantiques based on pictures by Marc Chagall. Flamme is particularly committed to the rediscovery of the French composer Auguste Fauchard whose works he presented in first recordings. In 2013, he was responsible for the German premiere of the Symphonie Eucharistique.

In 2018, Flamme was appointed honorary professor of the Hochschule für Musik Detmold.

== Recordings ==
- Organ Works Of The North German Baroque. Vol. I bis XV, 2004–2016.
- Wilhelm Friedemann Bach. Complete Organ Works, 2010.
- Marcel Dupré. Le Chemin de la Croix, 2005.
- Maurice Duruflé. Complete Organ Works, 2004.
- Carl Nielsen – Rued Langgaard. Organ Works, 2010.
- Auguste Fauchard, 1994.
- Auguste Fauchard. Anthologie Aristide Cavaillé-Coll. Vol. 4, 2004.
- Friedhelm Flamme plays pieces by Max Reger (among others Vier Choralfantasien), 2004.
- Walter Steffens. Guernica and other Paintings, 2009.
