= Broerkerk =

Church in Groningen, Netherlands

- from 1614 also: Academiekerk
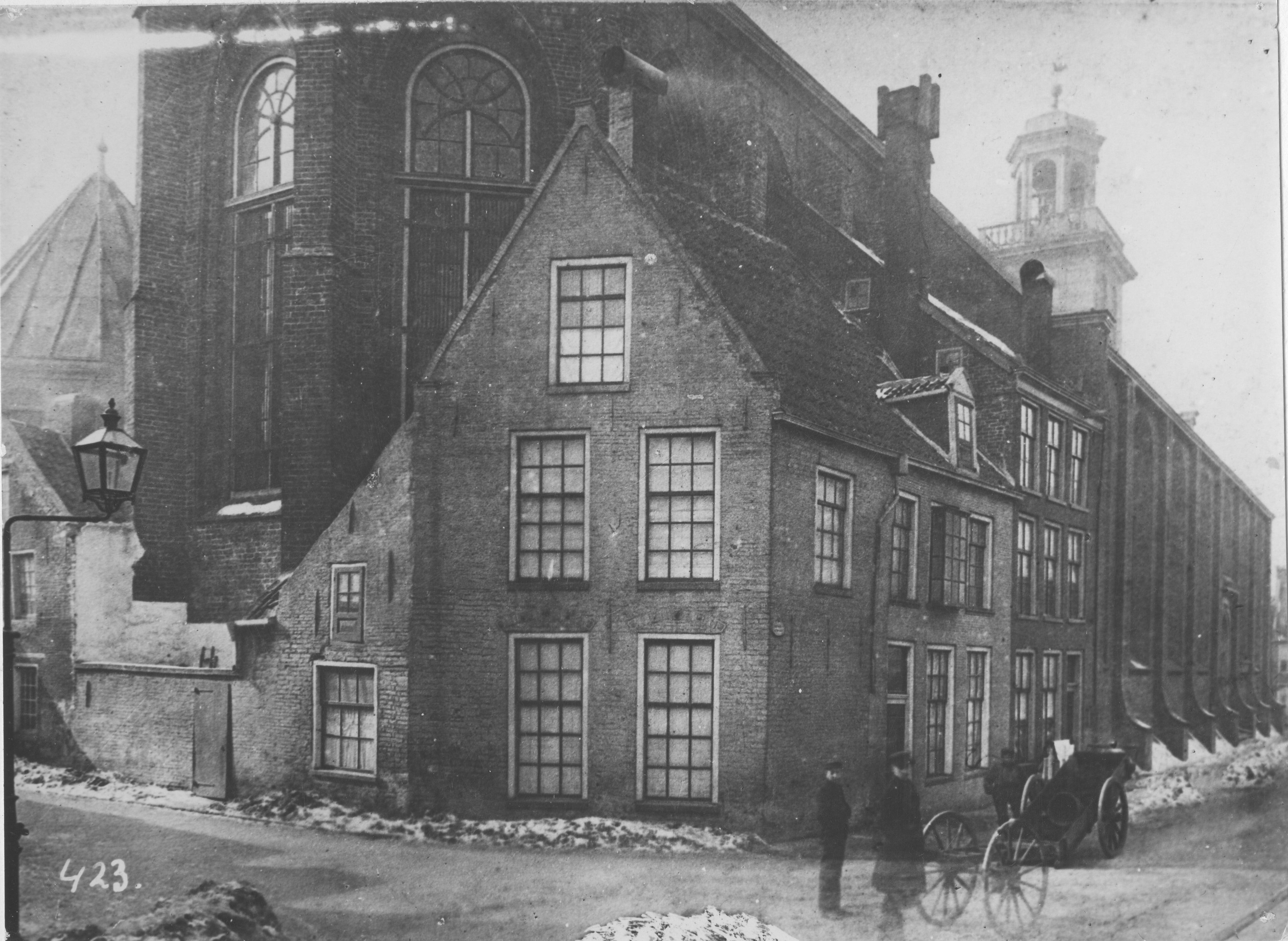
- Broerkerk (1575)
- Broerkerk
- 53°13′08″N 6°33′47″E
- Location: Groningen (city), Groningen (province)
- Country: Netherlands

History
- Status: Demolished

Architecture
- Designated: Middle Ages
- Architectural type: Church
- Demolished: 1895

Specifications
- Materials: Brick

The Broerkerk in Groningen, Netherlands, was a medieval church connected to the Franciscan cloister in Groningen. The church was situated in the Broerstraat in Groningen. The Broerkerk was the first church in the town used by the Protestants.

In 1702 Arp Schnitger built an organ for the Broerekerk in Groningen. For the organ he used pipe-work from the previous instrument built by Hendrick Hermans van Loon in 1679. In 1815 the organ was moved by J.W. Timpe to the Der Aa-kerk because the Broerkerk/Academiekerk had to be restored to the Roman Catholic Church.

After the city joined the Republic of the Seven United Netherlands, the church became the church of the University of Groningen (1614). In the 19th century the church was given back to the Roman Catholics. The church was in such a bad condition that the decision was taken to demolish it. The remains of the buried bodies found in and around the church were reburied at the Roman Catholic churchyard in town. In 1895 a new church was built on the same site as the former Broerkerk. The new church was named Sint Martinuskerk.

St. Martinuskerk
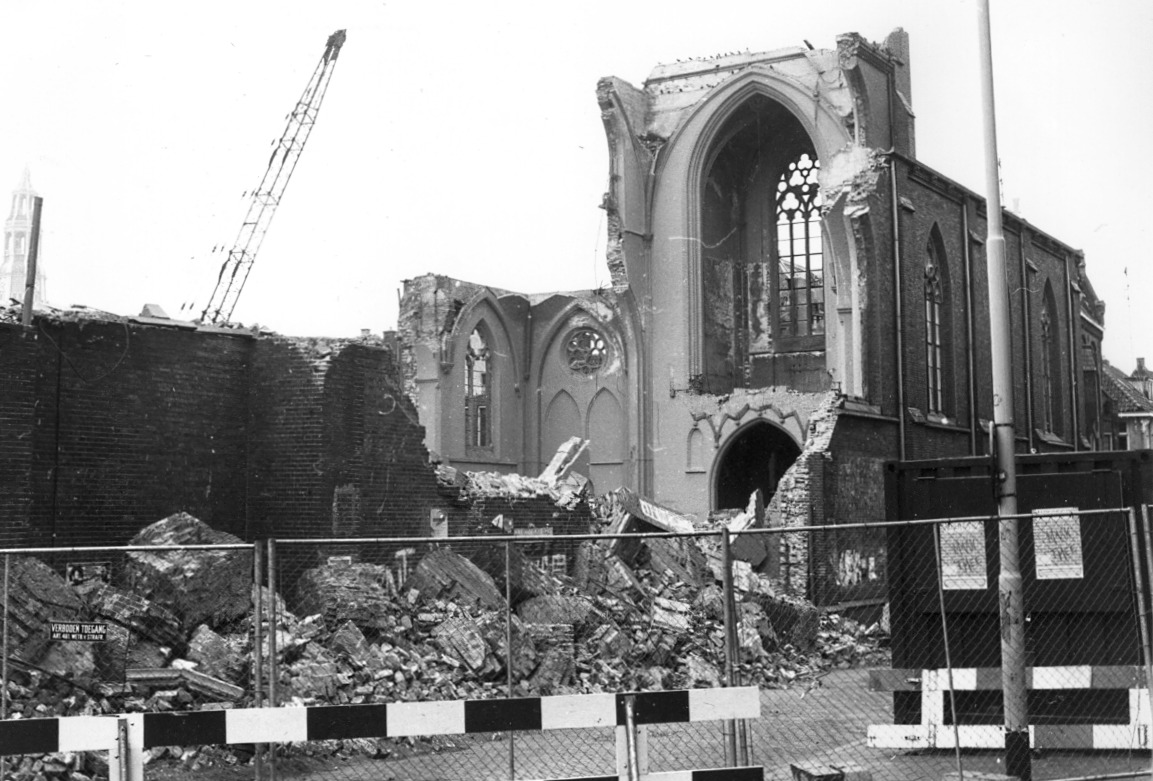
- St. Martinuskerk (1982)
- St. Martinuskerk
- Location: Groningen (city), Groningen (province)
- Country: Netherlands

History
- Status: Demolished

Architecture
- Designated: 1895
- Architect: P.J.H. Cuypers
- Architectural type: Church
- Style: Neogothic
- Completed: 1895
- Demolished: 1982

Specifications
- Materials: Brick

== Saint Martinuskerk ==
The Saint Martinuskerk in Groningen was built in 1895. The Neogothic church was designed by P.J.H. Cuypers. The church was built with brick and the interior was sober. In 1956 the church became a Cathedral when the bishopric of Groningen was formed. In 1970 the church was no longer used as church. The plans of changing the church into a library for the University of Groningen were too expensive and in 1982 the church was demolished. At its place the new library of the university was built.

The statue of Christ the King Jesus made by Jan Eloy Brom and his brother Leo Brom (placed in the church in 1936), was relocated to the Roman Catholic Churchyard cemetery in town.
