= Der Aa-kerk =

Aa-kerk
- The Church of Our Lady and St. Nicholas
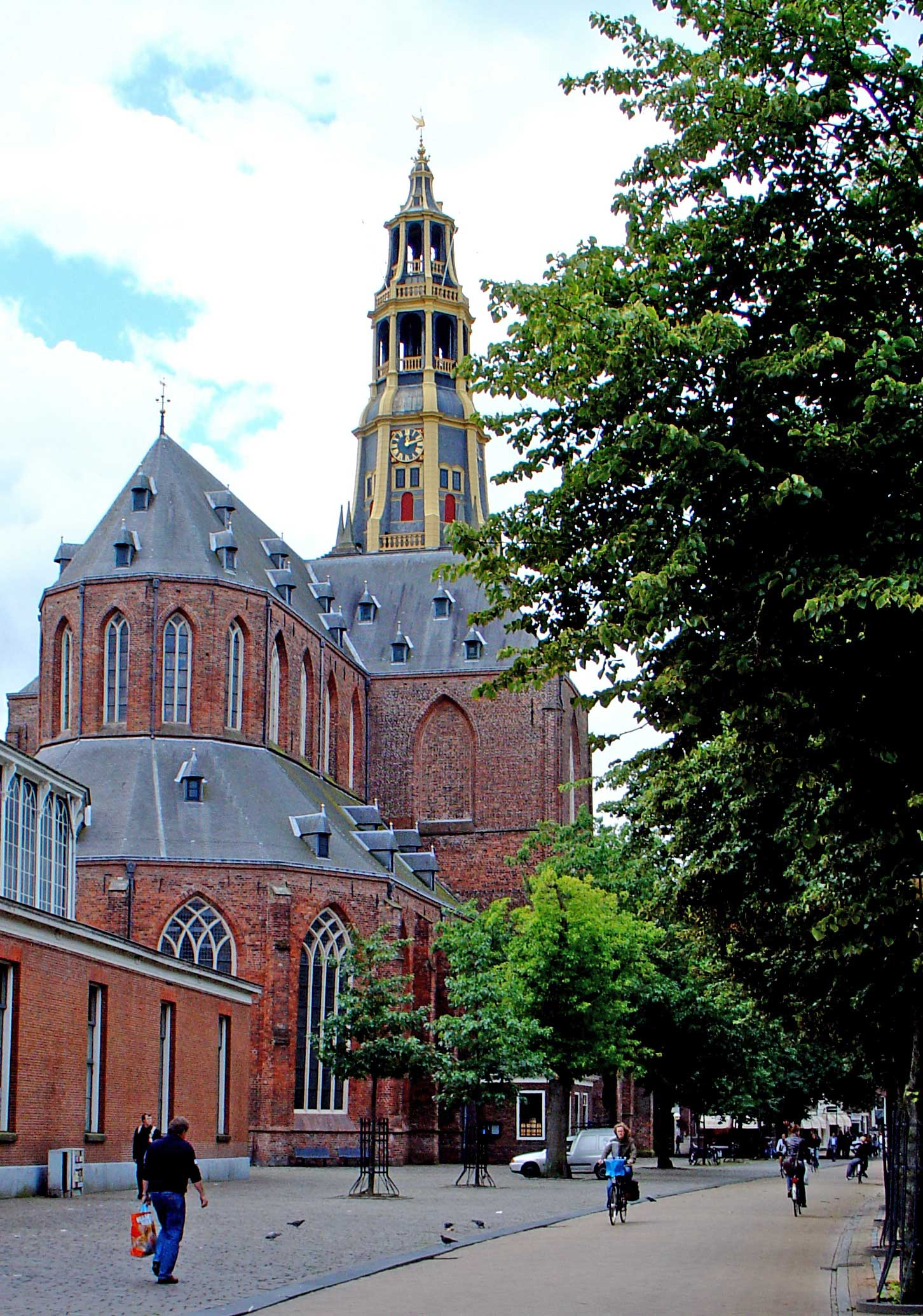
- The Aa-kerk from the East
- Aa-kerk
- 53°12′59″N 6°33′44″E
- Location: Groningen
- Country: Netherlands
- Denomination: None formerly Dutch Reformed
- Website: Der Aa-Kerk

History
- Status: Redundant
- Founded: 1247 (as a parish church)
- Dedication: Our Lady, Saint Nicholas

Architecture
- Architectural type: Church
- Style: Gothic

Specifications
- Length: 76 m (249 ft 4 in)
- Width: 25 m (82 ft 0 in)
- Height: 76 m (249 ft 4 in)
- Materials: Brick

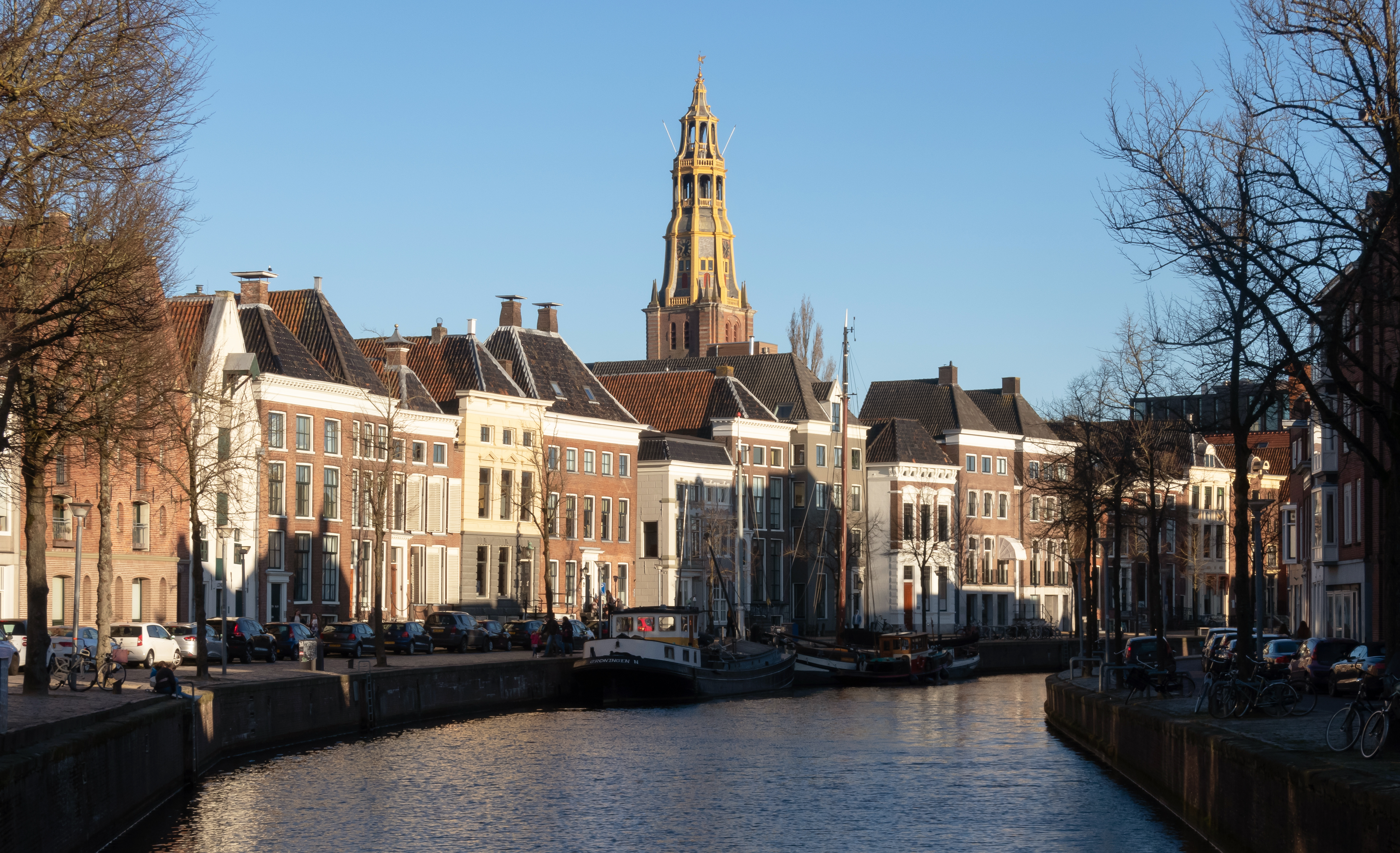
Aa-kerk from the bridge (the Visserbrug)

The Aa-kerk (also: A-kerk) is a historic former parish church in the centre of Groningen, and a dominant feature in the skyline of the city together with the nearby Martinitoren.

== History ==
Before the construction of the current church, a chapel dedicated to Mary and Saint Nicholas (patron saint of fishermen) stood on this site. The chapel was situated close to the river Aa, where bargees cast off vessels in the western harbour (Westerhaven).

The chapel became a parish church in the year 1247 and was named "Chapel of Our Lady at the river Aa" (Onze-Lieve-Vrouwe ter Aa-kerk). At this time, Groningen consisted of two centres, each surrounding a religious edifice, the Church of Our Lady at the river Aa being one of them. Fishermen and tradesmen inhabited the area around this chapel.

The chapel was transformed into a brick gothic church between 1425 and 1495. Both the interior and exterior have been altered many times over the course of history due to the iconoclasm during the Reformation, war damage (Siege of Groningen) and natural phenomena (lightning strike).

Today it is used as a venue for concerts, theatre, exhibitions, parties and meetings. Church services are no longer held.

== Towers ==
Images of the Siege of Groningen in 1672 show the Aa-kerk without the top of the tower. After the war a new wooden tower top was built.

On 23 April 1710, the tower spontaneously collapsed killing two people. In 1711, a new tower was built.

The current tower contains three bells with the notes of F#, D# and B, which are rung manually, using ropes. They were all cast by Crans of Enckhuysen in 1714.

== Organs ==
In 1667, an organ was built by Van Hagerbeer. It was destroyed by fire in 1671.

The first Schnitger organ in the church was built by Arp Schnitger in 1697 (see gallery for a sketch). In 1710, the tower of the church collapsed and the organ was destroyed.

The second Schnitger was built in 1702, originally for the Broerkerk in Groningen. In 1815, the organ was transferred to the Aa-kerk.

The Bolsward organ build by Raphael Rodensteen in 1550 was originally for the Martinikerk in Bolsward. In 1635, the organ was transferred to the Broerkerk in Groningen and in 1877 it was transferred back to the Martinikerk in Bolsward. In 1991, it was transferred again to Groningen and the Aa-kerk.

== Photo gallery ==
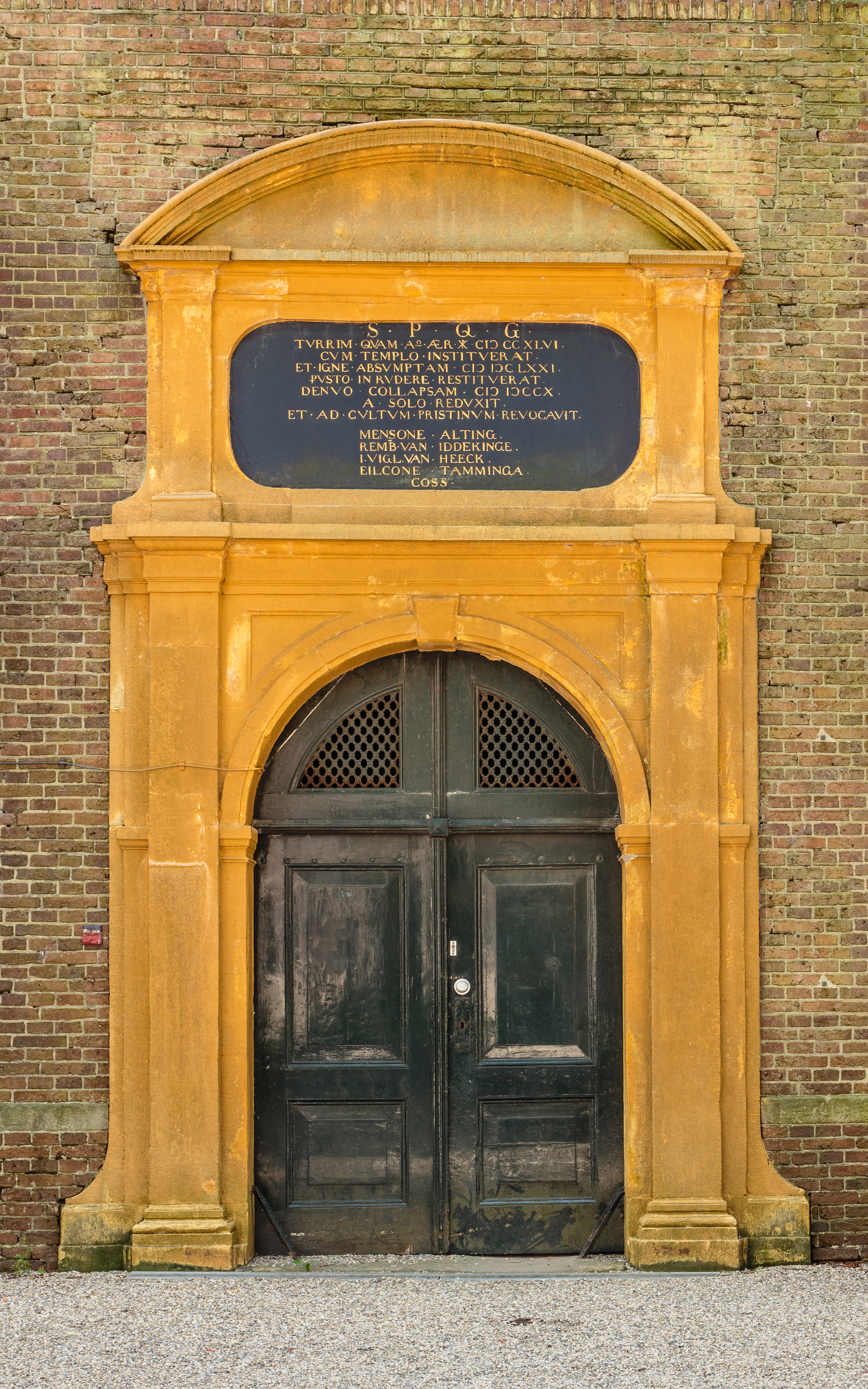
Entrance to the church through the tower. (West side).

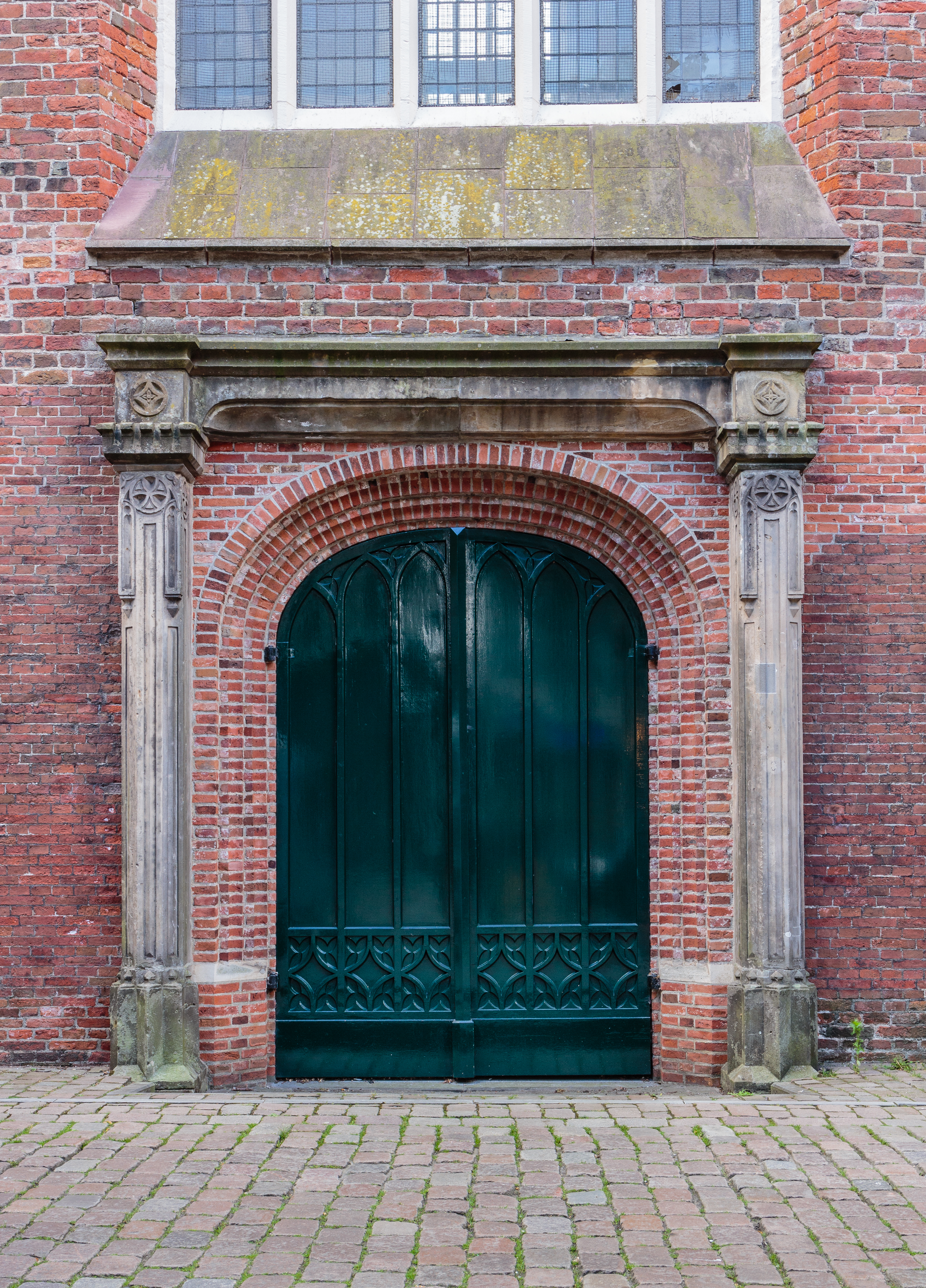
Entrance to the church. (Northside)

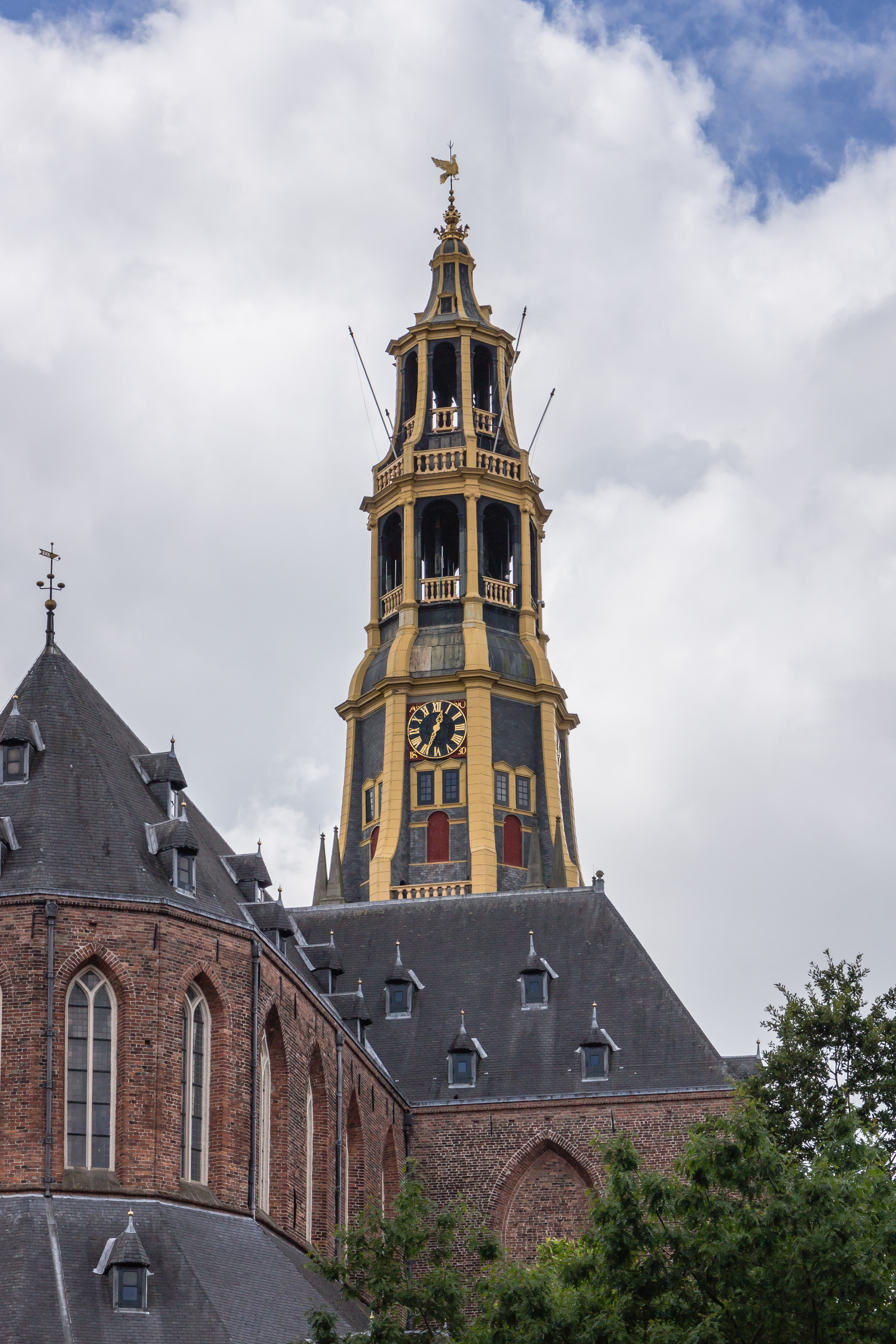
View of the tower. (from the East)

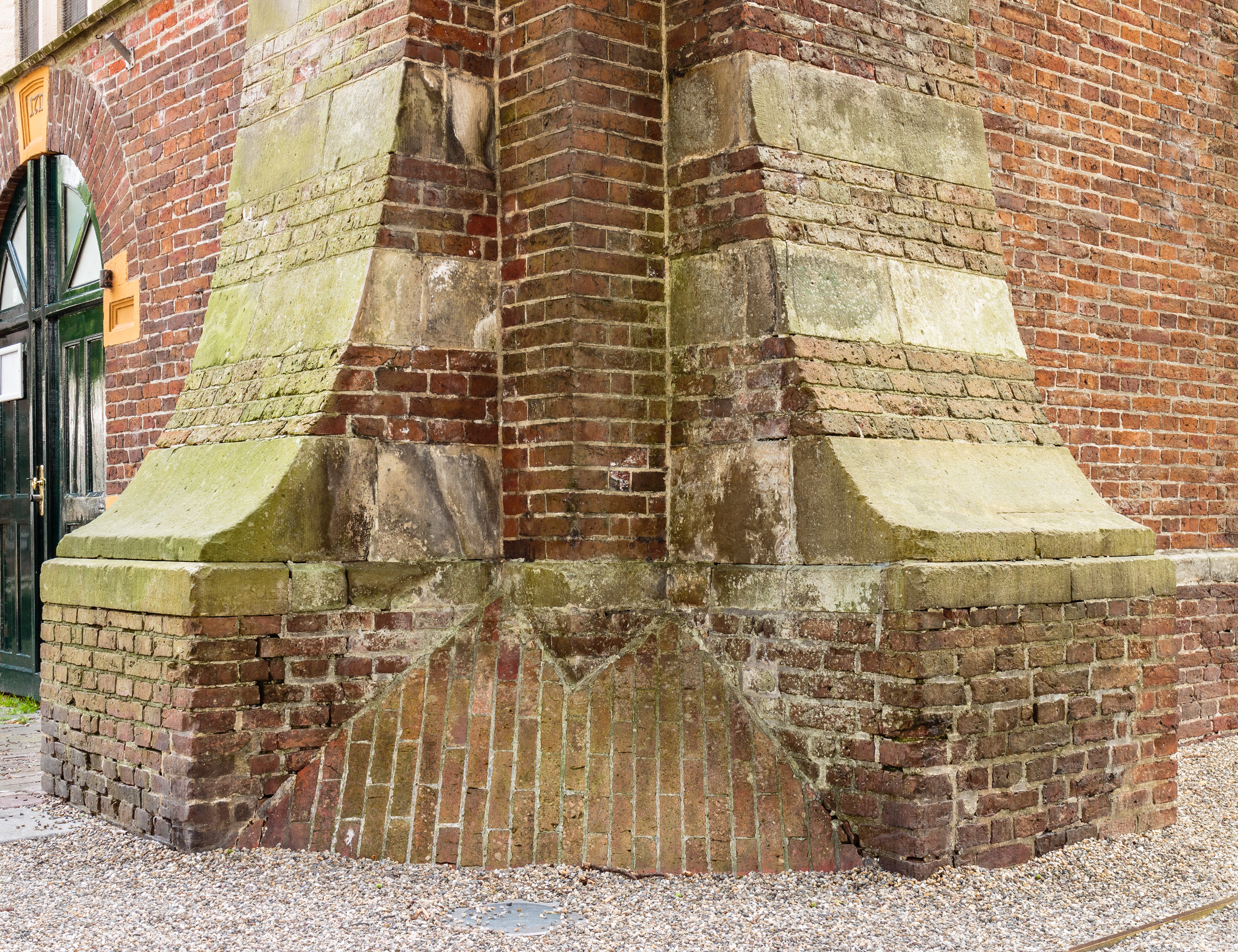
Brick buttress. (Northwest side)
