= Organ of St. Pankratius in Hamburg-Neuenfelde =

Musical organ

Coordinates: 53°31′14.6″N 9°48′38.8″E

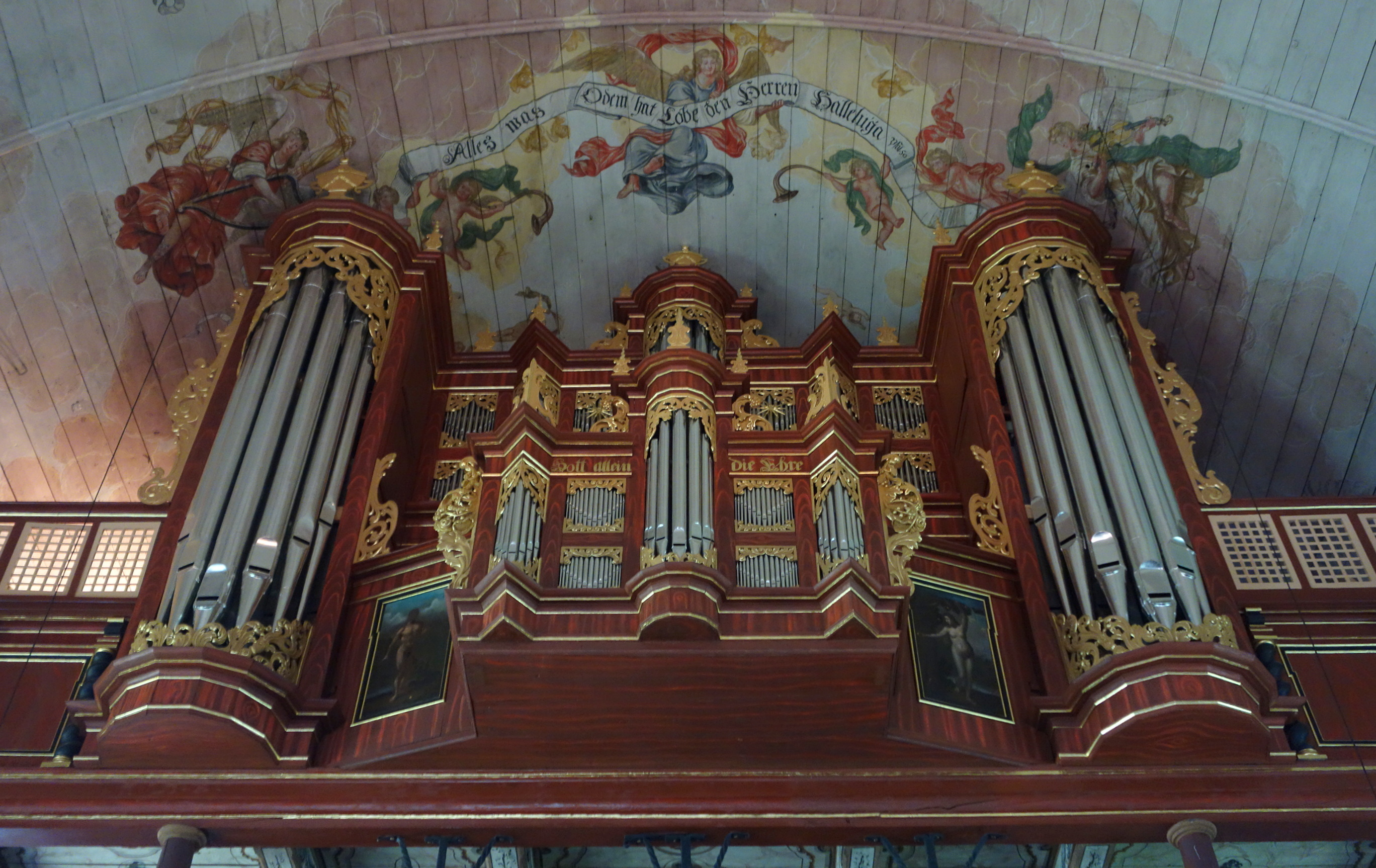
Organ in Neuenfelde

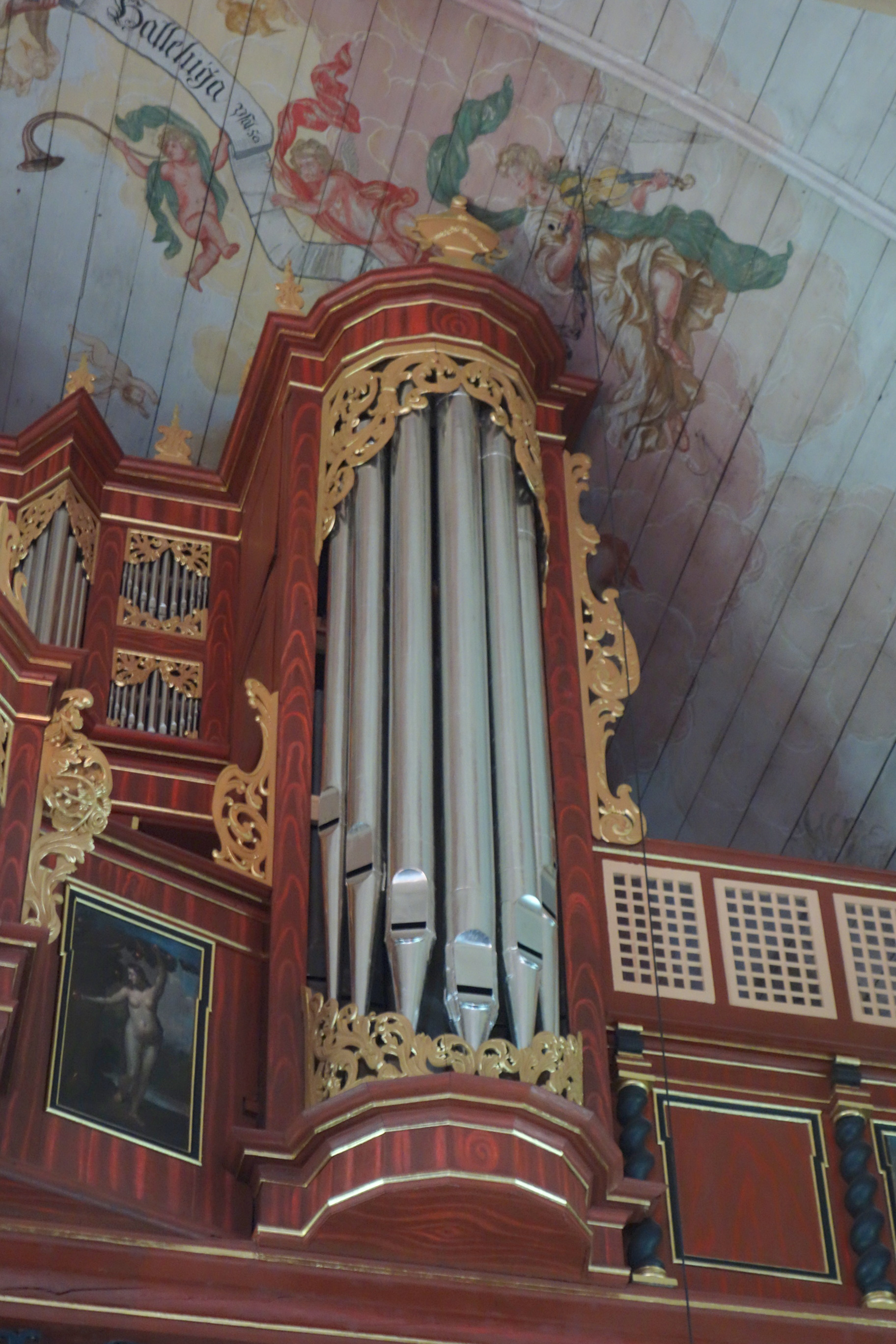
Pedal tower

The organ of the St. Pankratius in Hamburg-Neuenfelde was built in 1688 by Arp Schnitger, and is his largest two-manual organ. The instrument has 34 stops, of which about half are original. Neuenfelde itself belongs to the Altes Land and was incorporated to Hamburg in 1937.

== Building history ==
Schnitger was closely associated with Neuenfelde. He met his first wife here, whom he married in 1684. In 1693 he acquired the estate of his father-in-law Hans Otte in Neuenfelde and maintained another organ workshop, the so-called 'Orgelbauerhof', near Hamburg. He lived in Neuenfelde from 1705 at the earliest until his death in 1719, built his pew in St Pancras and was buried here.

=== Construction by Schnitger, 1688 ===
In 1672–73, Hans Christoph Fritzsche had built an organ in Neuenfelde with 14 stops; this had been extended with an independent pedal after Fritzsche's death in 1674. When the church was rebuilt in 1682, Schnitger stored the old organ and re-installed it in the new church. It seems that the instrument proved too small for the new building, and thus in 1683 Schnitger received an order for a new organ. Owing to continuing interior work in the church (including ceiling paintings) it was 1688 by the time Schnitger could begin construction, and in 21 weeks he completed the new organ on a nearly seven-metre-high west gallery. He transferred the old Fritzsche organ to the Pankratiuskirche in Stade, and extended it there with pedal towers.

Neuenfelde is Schnitger's largest two-manual organ. The facades of the Hauptwerk and the Rückpositiv are of five parts, each with a tall polygonal central tower and lateral pointed towers. Two-storey pipe-flats, which are separated by intermediate cornices, span between these towers. The pipes in the upper pipe-flats are dummies. There is a total of 204 original pipes, with a tin content of about 23%, in the facade. The Hauptwerk case is flanked on each side by further two-storey pipe-flats with mute pipes, connecting it with the pedal towers on the gallery parapets. The upper and lower cornices are profiled and have a frieze. The pipe-fields all have carved acanthus leaves with volutes at the top and at the bottom. The carved wings to each side are relatively narrow.

=== Later works ===
A small change in the disposition was made in 1750 by Jakob Albrecht (Lamstedt). Albrecht removed Schnitger's Trichterregal in the Rückpositiv, substituting the Krummhorn from the Hauptwerk. Georg Wilhelm Wilhelmy had the instrument in his care at the end of the 18th and beginning of the 19th century. He replaced the keyboards and the two Zimbelsterns, built a shove-coupler, and created the crowning urns on the casework.

Much more intrusive were the alterations by the Röver family of Stade in the 19th century. In 1867, Johann Heinrich Röver silenced the Rückpositiv and re-used two or three of Schnitger's flute stops in a new Hinterwerk. Fortunately, the Schnitger wind-chest was preserved. Carl Johann Heinrich Röver replaced at least five Schnitger stops in 1886 (mixtures and reeds).

=== Restorations ===
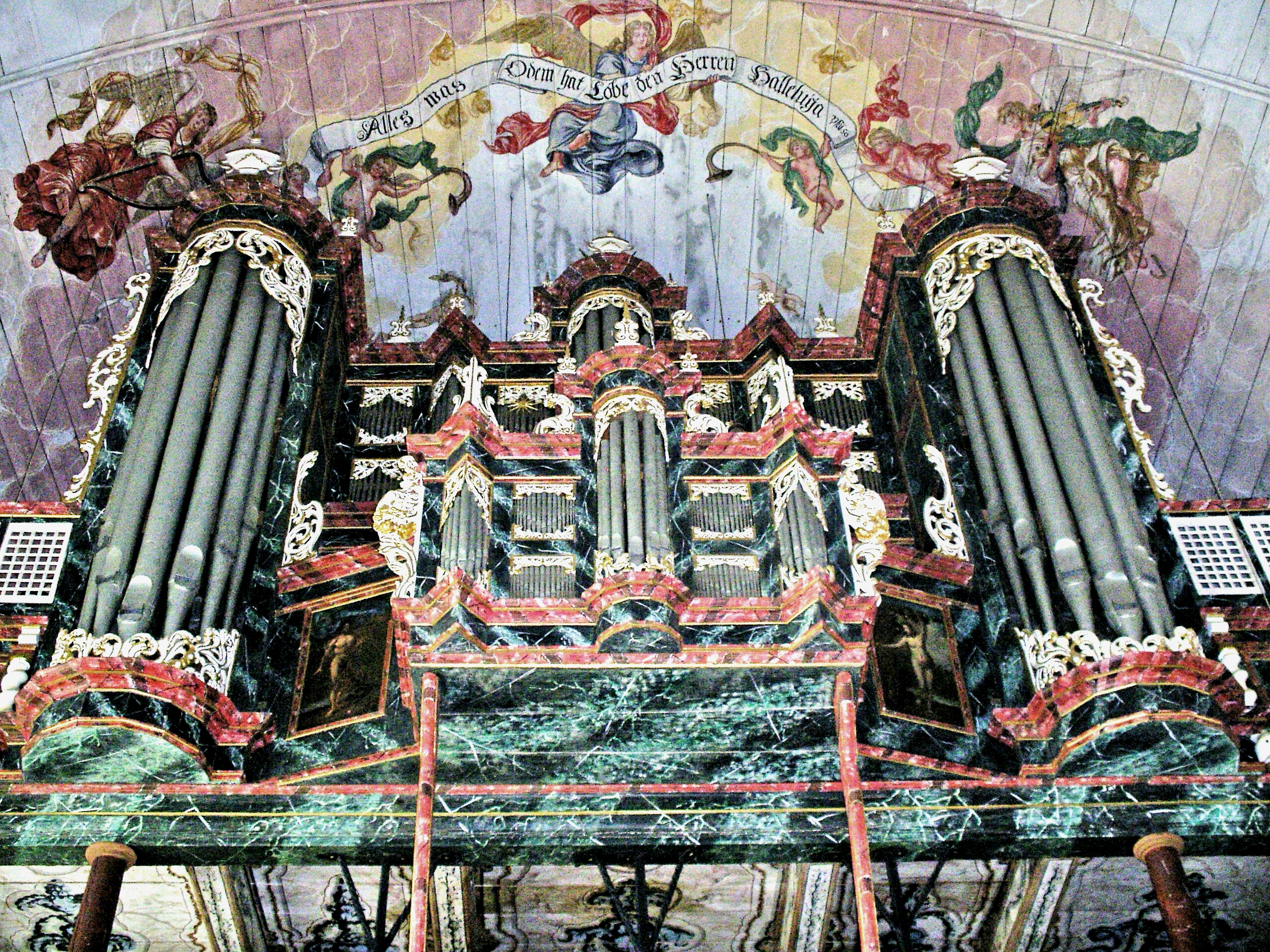
Old colouration, 1956–2016

The instrument exerted a great influence on the fledgling organ reform movement of the 20th century and it has been restored in several sections. In 1926, Hans Henny Jahnn and Karl Kemper re-instated the Rückpositiv, with Kemper replacing missing Schnitger stops mainly using stock pipework. Among these were three stops which were thought to be from the Scherer school, originating (according to the research of Gustav Fock) from the organ of the Aegidienkirche, Lübeck by Hans Scherer the Younger (1624–25). Research by Kristian Wegscheider in the context of the 2017 restoration showed that only a few pipes were by Scherer, and the majority were by Johann Friedrich Schulze.

In 1938, the organ builder Paul Ott (Göttingen) rebuilt all the mixtures and reed stops, and in this way further reduced the stock of original pipework. Rudolf von Beckerath (Hamburg) carried out a renovation of the winding system in 1950–51, a partial renewal of the mechanism and the installation of a new Vox humana.

Major restoration work was completed by Ott in 1978: the changes to the action were reversed, Schnitger's bellows design was reinstated and the pipe work re-voiced on a reduced wind pressure. However, the inconsistency of some ranks of pipes was becoming clear, due to their successive additions and un-sympathetic restorations. The noisy action was also distracting. In the course of these years, more voicing problems arose.

=== Restoration 2015–2017 ===
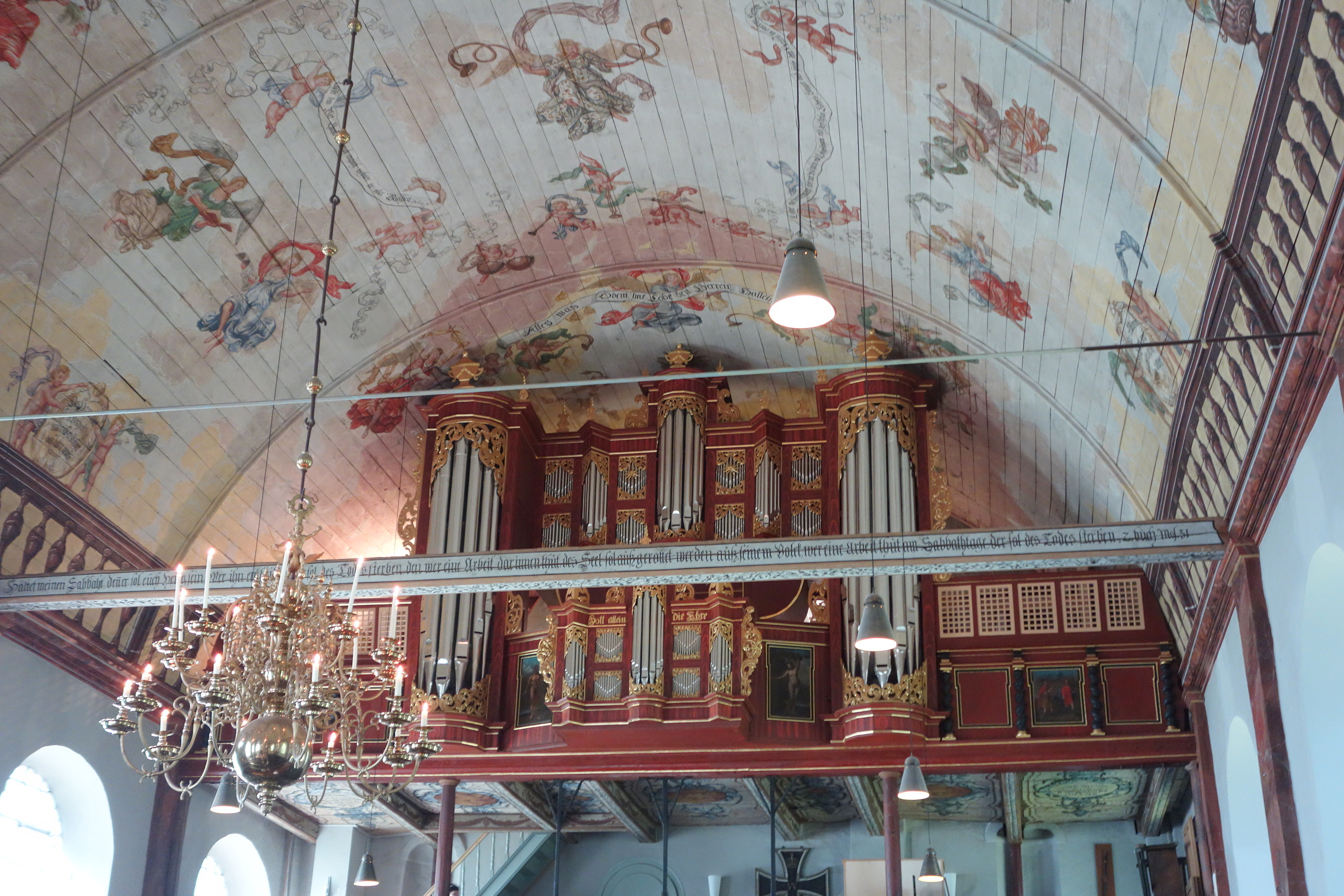
Organ balcony

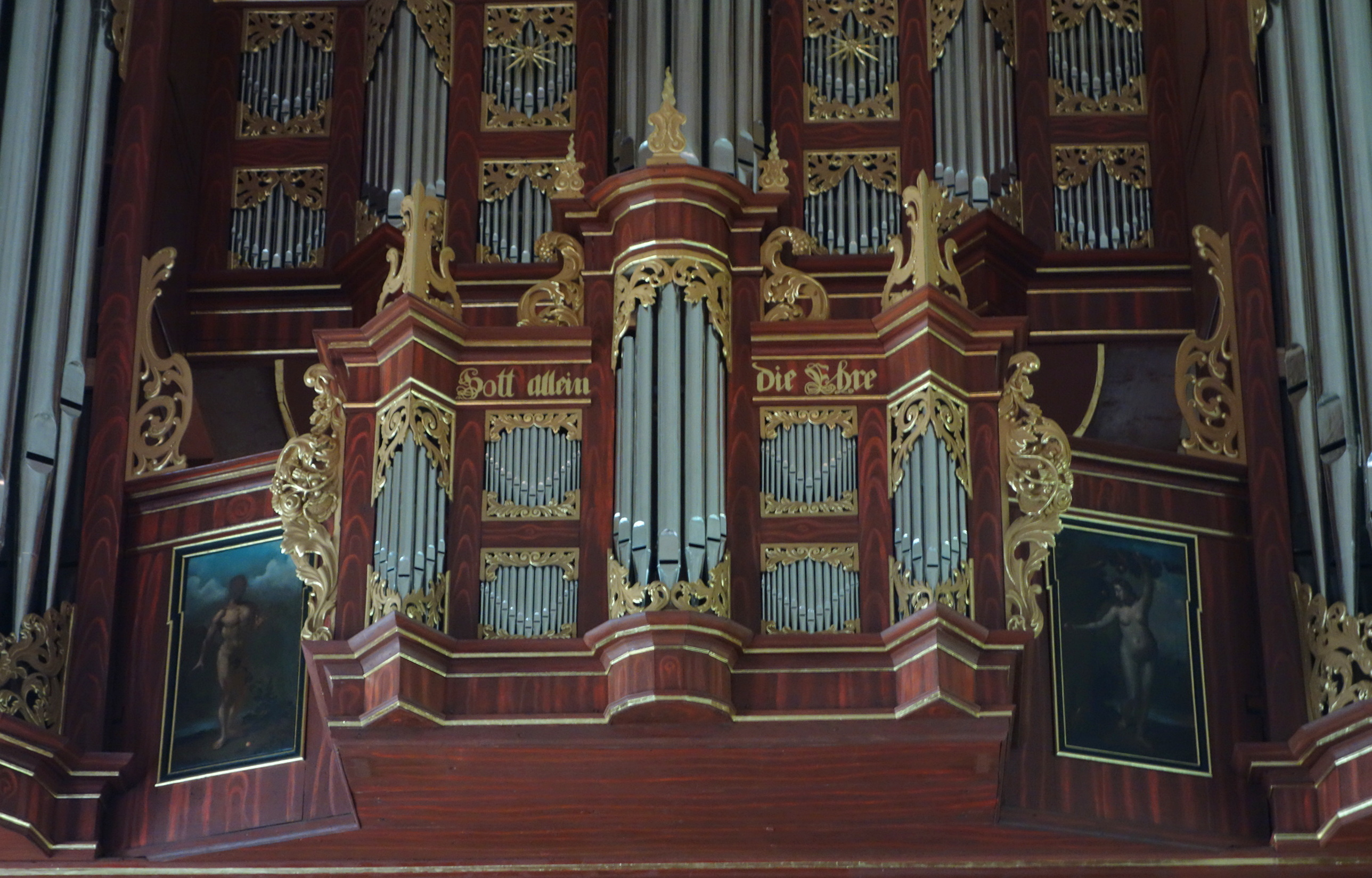
Rückpositiv

A comprehensive restoration was carried out from 2015 to 2017 by the Wegscheider workshop, according to strict conservation principles and in light of the latest research, on the initiative of the organist Hilger Kespohl. During this time, the case-work remained in the church, where it was slightly straightened out and stabilized. The restoration of the organ case, as well as the uncovering and restoration of the original colouration, was carried out by the Wellmer Restorations studio from Himbergen-Groß Thondorf in 2015–17.

Investigation of the organ's interior found that more original material had survived than previously suspected: many parts of the mechanism, and many pipes, were old but no longer in their original places. All pipes later than Schnitger's were replaced, especially the mixtures and the reeds – a total of 1,301 pipes. Schnitger's wind-chests survived, as did the tracker mechanism of the Oberwerk, while Wegscheider reconstructed the Rückpositiv and pedal actions. Wilhelmy's keyboards (c. 1800) were retained, including his shove-coupler. Wind pressure tests shewed best results with the relatively high pressure of 84 mm. The 3-rank Cimbel is a fourth-sixth-cimbel, as described by Michael Praetorius in his Organographia (1619).

In 2014 a Federal Subsidy was approved from German public funds of 300,000 euros toward the total renovation costs of about 850,000 euros.

In January 2017 the current colouring was completed, based on mahogany, replacing the previous green and red faux-marble scheme.

The newly designed, modified meantone temperament is similar to that of the organ of St. Ludgeri in Norden; as at Norden, it is similarly free of wolf fifths. Neuenfelde's tuning is based on six fifths each narrowed by 1/5 Pythagorean comma to F, C, G, A, E and B. The fifth D - A and the four remaining fifths are pure; D# - B♭ is widened by around 1/5 comma.

The re-inauguration of the organ took place on 12 June 2017 by Bishop Kirsten Fehrs.

== Disposition ==
The actual state of the organ shows the original disposition:

I Rückpositiv CDEFGA–c^{3}
Principal	4′	S
Gedact	8′	S/W
Quintadena	8′	S/W
Plockfloit	4′	S
Quintfloit	3′	S/W
Octav	2′	S/W
Siefloit	1 1/2′	W
Sexquialt II		W
Tertzian II		W
Scharf IV–VI		W
Trechter Regal	8′	W

II Oberwerk CDEFGA–c^{3}
Principal	8′	S
Quintadena	16′	S
Rohrfloit	8′	S
Octav	4′	S
Spitzfloit	4′	S
Nasat	3′	S (Note: Conical.)
Octav	2′	S
Spielfloit	2′	S
Rauschpfeiff II		S
Mixtur V–VI		W
Cimbel III		W
Trommet	8′	S/W
Krummhorn	8′	W

Pedal CDE–d^{1}
Principal	16′	S
Octav	8′	S
Octav	4′	S
Floit	4′	S
Nachthorn	2′	W
Rauschpfeiff II		(S)/W
Mixtur V		W
Posaun	16′	W
Trommet	8′	W
Cornet	2′	W

- Sliding coupler II/I
- Tremulant (S/W)
- 2 Zimbelsterns (Wi), Nachtigall (W)

Notes

S = Arp Schnitger (1688)
Wi = Wilhelmy (ca. 1800)
W = Kristian Wegscheider (2017)

== Technical data ==
- 34 stops, 54 ranks of pipes
- Wind system:
  - 6 wedge bellows (Schnitger)
  - Check valve for pedal
  - Wind pressure: 84 mmWS
- Windchests (Schnitger)
- Mechanism/Action:
  - Keyboards: manuals (Wilhelmy), pedal (Wilhelmy/Wegscheider)
  - Key action: Mechanical
  - Stop action: Mechanical
- Temperament:
  - Modified meantone temperament
  - Pitch: 3/4 tone above a1 = 440 Hz

== Bibliography ==
- Dietrich Diederichs-Gottschalk (2017). Mein Schall aufs Ewig weist. Die Bildprogramme an Orgelemporen und Kirchenausstattungen in der St. Bartholomäuskirche Golzwarden und der St. Pankratiuskirche Hamburg-Neuenfelde im Kontext der Orgeln von Arp Schnitger. Oldenburg: Isensee. ISBN 978-3-7308-1404-8.
- Cornelius H. Edskes, Harald Vogel, translated by Joel Speerstra (2016). Arp Schnitger and his Work. Bremen: Edition Falkenberg. ISBN 978-3-95494-092-9. pp. 22–23, 146–147.
- Gustav Fock (1974). Arp Schnitger und seine Schule. Ein Beitrag zur Geschichte des Orgelbaues im Nord- und Ostseeküstengebiet. Kassel: Bärenreiter. ISBN 3-7618-0261-7. pp. 77–79.
- Gustav Fock (1959). Arp Schnitgers Beziehungen zu Neuenfelde. In: Gustav Fock (ed.): 900 Jahre Neuenfelde, vormals Hasselwerder. Hamburg-Neuenfelde/Buxtehude: Buchwitz. pp. 45–52.
- Peter Golon, Hilger Kespohl, Dorothea Schröder, Kristian Wegscheider (2019). Hamburg-Neuenfelde, St. Pankratius. Arp-Schnitger-Orgel. Regensburg: Schnell & Steiner. ISBN 978-3-7954-3461-8.
- Konrad Küster, Hans Tegtmeyer (ed.) (2007). Gott allein die Ehre – Der Orgelreichtum im Alten Land. Stade: Landschaftsverband Stade. ISBN 978-3-931879-31-0.
- Günter Seggermann, Alexander Steinhilber, Hans-Jürgen Wulf (2019). Die Orgeln in Hamburg. Kiel: Ludwig ISBN 978-3-86935-366-1. pp. 165–166.
