= Schnitger organ (Hamburg) =

Coordinates: 53°33′01″N 10°00′01″E

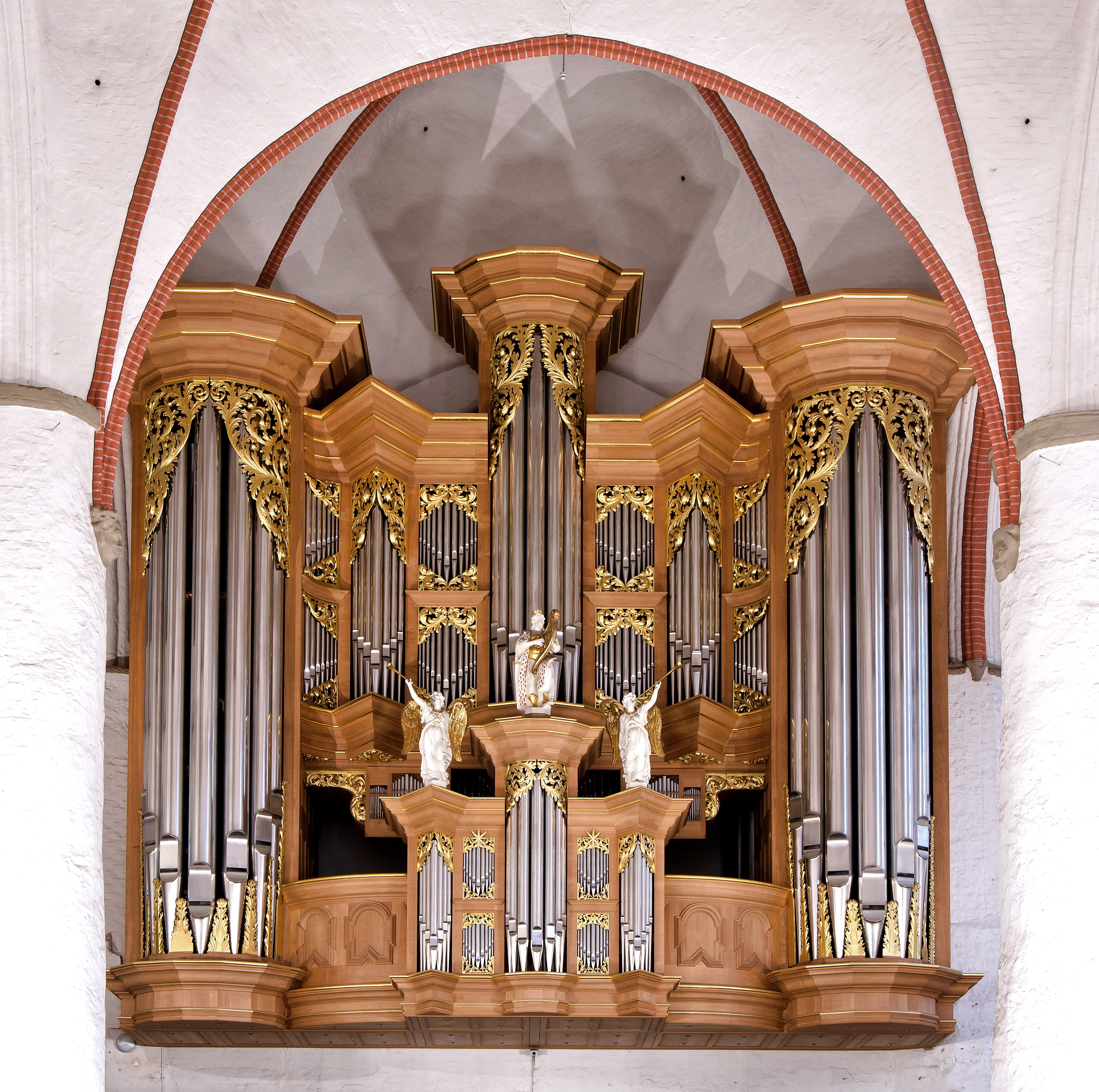
Façade

The organ of the St. Jacobi Church (St. James' Church) in Hamburg, was built from 1689 to 1693 by the most renowned organ builder of his time, Arp Schnitger. The organ boasts four manuals and pedal with 60 stops, 15 of which are reeds – and has approximately 4000 sounding pipes. All in all, from the organ's original installation and its condition today (despite the partial destruction during World War II) not much of its conception has changed. The old pipework and the prospect pipes have been preserved in almost original format. It is the largest organ in existence from before 1700 and is one of the most eminent Baroque instruments that have been preserved.

== Building history ==
=== Preceding instruments ===
It is not yet documented when the very first organ at St. Jacobi was built. Nevertheless, it can be attested to that there was a certain organist at St. Jacobi named "Meister Rudolf" around 1300. It is known that from 1512 – 1516 a two-manual instrument was built by Jacob Iversand and Harmen Stüven. A Rückpositiv (positive organ division) was added before 1543. Further refurbishments followed in the 16th and 17th centuries by several builders. Among them were Jacob Scherer (from 1551), his son-in-law Dirk Hoyer (1577–1578) who built a new Rückpositiv and two new pedal towers; also Hans Bockelmann (1588–1589) and Hans Scherer the Elder (1588–1592) who provided a new Oberwerk (upper division). Scherer's sons Hans and Fritz refurbished the organ in 1606/7. At the end of the 16th century, musician Hieronymus Praetorius thus ended up having one of the most impressive and large instruments in the country at his disposal. The earlier disposition of 1592 with 53 stops and 3 manuals is provided by Michael Praetorius in his treatise, Syntagma Musicum:

Disposition of 1592

I Rückpositiv CDEFGA–c^{3}
Principal	8′
Octava	4′
Scharp
Mixtur
Gedact	8′
Quintadeen	8′
Holflœit	4′
Blockflœit	4′
Gemßhorn	2′
Ziflœit
Klingende Zimbel
Schalmeyen	4′
Baarpfeiffe	8′
Regal	8′
Krumbhorn	8′

II Im Ober Werck FGA–g^{2}a^{2}
Principal	12′
Octava	6′
Quintadeen	12′
Holpipe	6′
Holflœit	3′
Querpipe	6′ (Note: "12. Schue lang / und ist offen".)
Rußpipe
Scharp
Mixtur

III Oben in der Brust (Note: To be played at II or III.)
Principal	8′ (Note: "Angehende im C".)
Holpipe	8′
Flœite	4′
Offen Querflœite	4′ (Note: "8. füsse lang".)
Nasatt vff die Quinte	3′
Gemßhorn	2′
Kleinflœit	2′
Klingende Zimbel III
Trompette	8′
Regal	8′
Zincke	8′ (Note: "Vom f biß ins a^{2} wie gebräuchlich".)

III Unten in der Brust FGA–g^{2}a^{2}
Krumbhorn	8′
Quintflœit	3′
Waltflœit	2′
Spitzflœit D	4′

Pedal CDEFGA–c^{1}d^{1}
Principal	24′ (Note: "Aus dem F".)
Mixtur	12′ (Note: "Wobey 1. Baß von 12.fuß".)
Principal C	16′
GroßBaß	16′
Octava	4′
GemßhornBaß
Spitzquinte
Zimbel
Mixtur
Spillpipe	4′
Krumbhorn	16′
Bassaune	16′
Trommete	8′
Cornett	2′

Annotations

Schematic "Werkprinzip" of the Hamburg prospect (Pd=Pedal, OP=Oberpositiv, We=Werck, BP=Brustpositiv, RP=Rückpositiv)

Between 1635 and 1636, Gottfried Fritzsche greatly expanded the instrument from its previous Renaissance keyboard range. It was enlarged to span four octaves and four manuals. Ulrich Cernitz, St. Jacobi organist of the time (who had studied with Jan Pieterszoon Sweelinck) reported extensively on these expansions which led to the instrument having more than 56 registers. Renovations were also made by his son, Hans Christoph Fritzsche, in 1655.

=== New build by Schnitger in 1693 ===
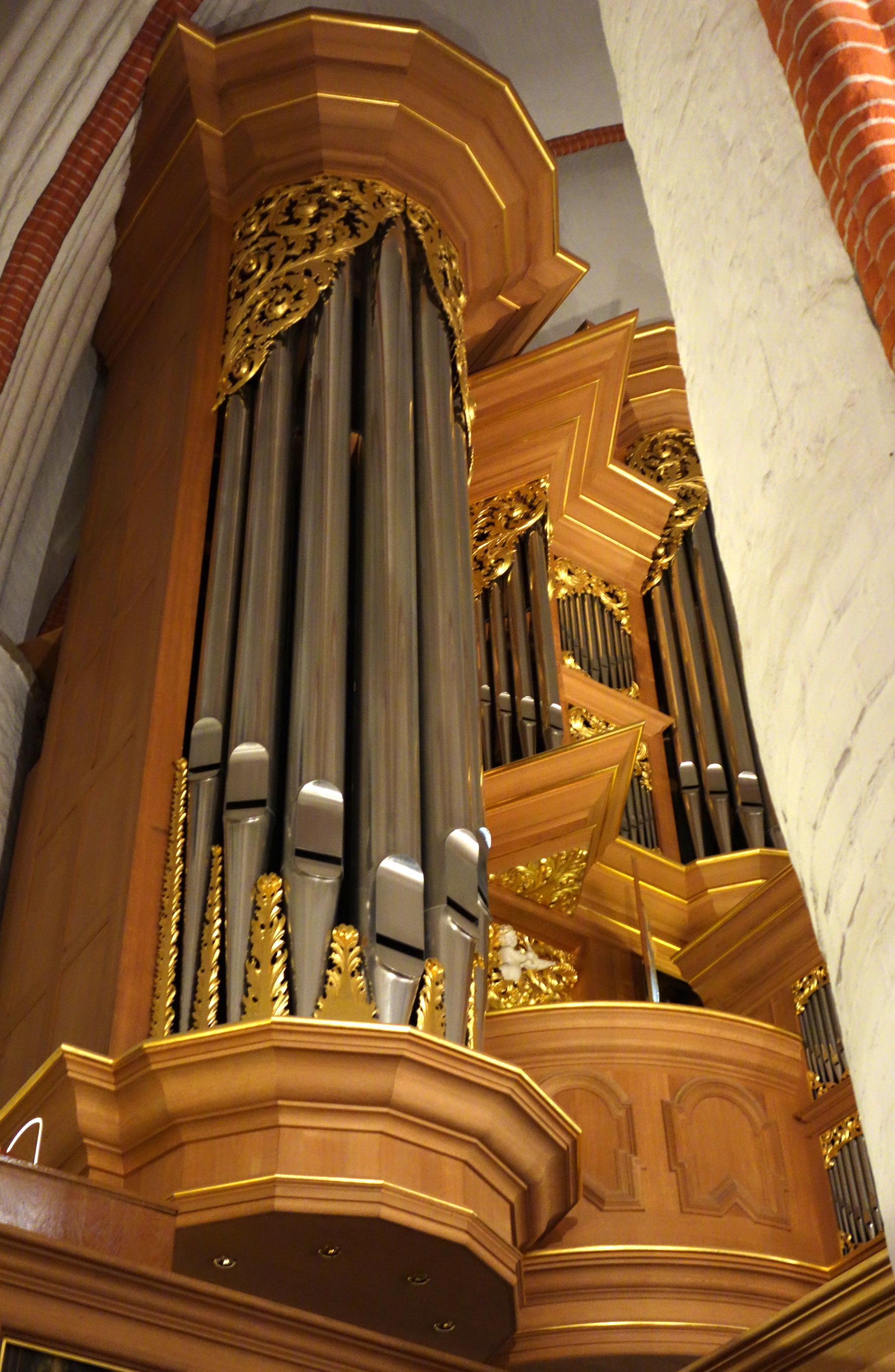
Polygonal Pedal Tower

Arp Schnitger used the existing instrument and kept 27 of the stops (including some of the oldest pipes of the original 1516 organ) for his project. Schnitger built the rest of the stops himself. He then expanded the four-manual instrument to 60 stops. Despite the advice of one of the most prominent organists at the church of St. Katharinen in Hamburg, Johann Adam Reincken, Schnitger installed both a Principal 32' and Posaune 32' into the pedal. This brought a tremendous prestige factor to the instrument. The total costs for this project was 29.108 Marks. The different divisions have the following (German) names: Werck (Hauptwerk), Rückpositiv, Oberpositiv, Brustpositiv and Pedal. The prospect of the Schnitger organ in St. Jacobi is the largest existing example of the so-called "Hamburg Prospects": those having many-tiered divisional structures that was developed by the organ builder family Scherer in Hamburg around 1600. Typical for these fronts are the symmetrical case with the large pedal towers at each side and the staggered arrangement of the manual divisions, although the Oberpositiv did not appear in these frontal prospects. Instead, it was located in a higher position behind the Werck (having no back panel). The directness of the sound is in part created by the wide downward shaping arches of the building. These create excellent acoustics. The figures on the prospect were cut by Christian Precht and belong to his latest known works.

In 1720, Johann Sebastian Bach applied for the position of organist at St. Jacobi. However Bach, despite being a famed organist, did not get the position. Instead it was awarded to Johann Joachim Heitmann, who was able to pay the required high sum of 4000 Mark into the church fund and also marrying the pastor's daughter. In the records of Johann Mattheson we find part of a rather severe sermon by the pastor of St. Jacobi at the time, Erdmann Neumeister: "He believed with certainty that – if one of the angels were to descend from heaven and, wanting to become an organist of St. Jacobi, played divinely – but if this angel from Bethlehem had no money, they would simply have to fly away again."

It is confirmed that Bach also played the organ in the neighbouring church of St. Katharinen. Apparently the condition of the St. Jacobi instrument was (temporarily) not very good. He therefore left before playing the official audition for the post.

The disposition of 1721 was notated by organbuilder Otto Diedrich Richborn:

Disposition of 1721

I Rückpositiv CDE–c^{3}
Principal	8′
Gedackt	8′
Quintadehna	8′
Octava	4′
Blockflöht	4′
Nahsat	3′
Octava	2′
Siffloit	1^{1}/_{2}′
Sexquialtera II
Scharff VI–VIII
Dulcian	16′
Bahrpfeiffe	8′

II Werck CDEFGA–c^{3}
Principal	16′
Quintadehn	16′
Octava	8′
Spitzflöht	8′
Gedackt	8′
Octava	4′
Rohrflöht	4′
Flachflöht	2′
Super Octav	2′
Rauschpfeiff III
Mixtur VII–IX
Trommet	16′

III Oberpositiv CDEFGA–c^{3}
Principal	8′
Rohrflöht	8′
Hollflöht	8′
Spitzflöht	4′
Octava	4′
Nasat	3′
Octava	2′
Gemshorn	2′
Scharff IV–VI
Cimbel III
Trommet	8′
Vox humana	8′
Trommet	4′

IV Brustpositiv CDEFGA–c^{3}
Principal	8′
Octav	4′
Holtzflöth	4′
Waldtflöht	2′
Sexquialtera II
Scharff IV–VI
Dulcian	8′
Trechter Regal	8′

Pedal CD–d^{1}
Principal	32′
Octava	16′
Subbass	16′
Octava	8′
Octava	4′
Nachthorn	2′
Rauschpfeiff III
Mixtur VI–VIII
Posaune	32′
Posaune	16′
Dulciane	16′
Trommet	8′
Trommet	4′
Cornet	2′

- 2 tremulants
- Zimbelstern, Trommel
- 5 stop valves, 1 main valve

=== Later work ===
In 1722 Otto Diedrich Richborn made a small change in the organ's disposition. Later, in 1761, organ builder Johann Jacob Lehnert from Hamburg also slightly changed the disposition. From 1774 to 1775, Johann Paul Geycke renewed the console. Further renovations were carried out in 1790 by Johann Daniel Kahl; then once again in 1836 and 1846 by Johann Gottlieb Wolfsteller. In 1866, new wind channels and compensatory bellows were built. Jürgen Marcussen made a further disposition change by installing an additional pneumatic system with five registers in 1890.

=== Restorations ===
In 1917 there was a serious invasion of the tonal quality of the instrument. This happened when the tin prospect pipes had to be taken down and handed over to the army administration's metal collection during the First World War. After World War I, Hans Henny Jahnn and Gottlieb Harms discovered and realized the value of this instrument. They advocated for the repair and replacement of the missing front pipes. Substantial funds were raised for this purpose with a series of benefit concerts (called Ugrino concerts) in 1922. Jahnn managed to secure Günther Ramin, organist of the Leipzig Thomaskirche, for these concerts. Ramin brought back compositions of Hamburg organists of the 17th century alongside works of Buxtehude and Bach to the concert space for the first time in a long while. At the organ convention, initiated by Jahnn in Hamburg and Lübeck in July 1925, the Schnitger organ in St. Jacobi became a great focus of interest in the organ scene of Northern Europe. It became known as a model instrument for Baroque and pre-Baroque organ music.

Because the wind chests, pipework and carvings were removed in 1942, this prevented these sound-producing parts of the organ from being destroyed in World War II. When the church completely burned down, Schnitger's case, the bellow enclosure and the console of 1774 were lost. The southern nave was only slightly destroyed, and after its restoration in 1950 the Lübeck organ workshop Kemper made a provisional installation. Kemper had already carried out the restoration work of previous decades under the direction of and cooperation with Hans Henny Jahnn.

Another step along the way towards restoration was at the old site in the west of the main nave, completed in 1961. It included a new case for the old divisions, a new console with carved heads for register knobs (1950), an extension of the keyboard ranges with the necessary technical adjustments and an extremely stiff action by Kemper. This effort resulted in a sound that was phonetically uneven, and an action that was unsatisfactory. The use of different wind pressures in the manual divisions and the pedal did not correspond to historical building practice. The pipework had been shortened in different ways during the course of the 19th and 20th centuries to emulate modern pitch. Many pipes on the wind chests became displaced. The sound of the principal choir was too similar to that of the flutes. The reeds had no stability. Furthermore, the proportions of the case were incorrect, because the keyboard extensions led to many additional large pipes that had to be considered. Despite all this, the sound quality of the instrument was still recognizable and continued to fascinate listeners.

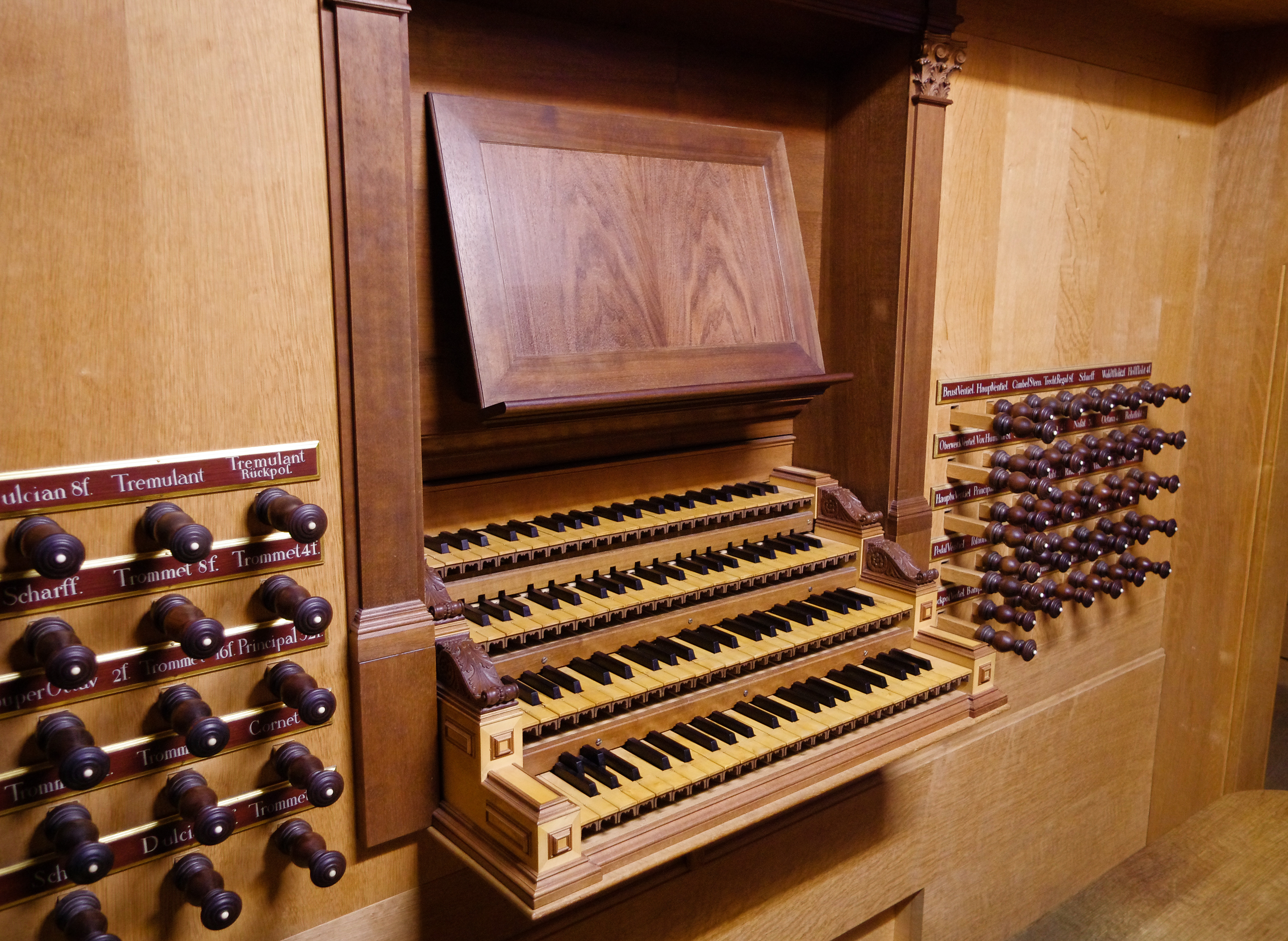
Reconstructed Console

The push for a fundamental restoration of the organ came from St. Jacobi organist Rudolf Kelber in 1982. He wanted to get rid of all the technical defects and problems in sound quality. A consensus was reached to restore it to the old state i.e. that of the Jacobi organ as it was in the late 18th century, with all its surviving components. These included the registers by Johann Jacob Lehnert from the year 1761 (the Viola di Gamba 8 'in the Werck and the Trommet 8' in the Rückpositiv). No attempt was made to reconstruct the console from 1774. Instead it made more sense to return to the concept of Schnitger, with the short octave in the manual keyboards. This was done according to the model of the Schnitger console received from the Lübeck Dom organ. The recovery of the original case proportions with original Schnitger wind chest dimensions was essential. A compromise here was the addition of the note D sharp (or E flat) in the bass octave of the pedal. This was placed on an auxiliary chest outside the case. The wind supply was set up with six wedge bellows located in the upper area of the tower space, behind the organ.

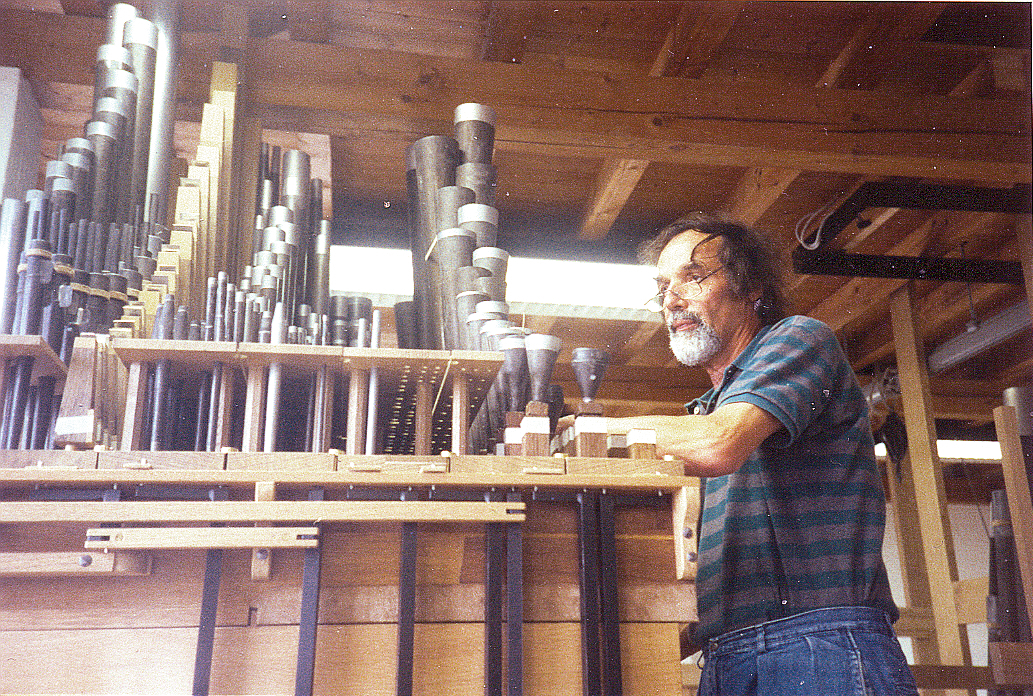
Jürgen Ahrend in his workshop during the pre-intonation of the Oberwerk

Jürgen Ahrend, regarded as a connoisseur of Schnitger organs (and who had all the resources needed for this project in his workshop) was commissioned for this project. The materials included a provision of wood that had been stored up for decades. Three hundred years after the completion of the organ built by Arp Schnitger, the restored instrument was inaugurated in 1993. Cornelius H. Edskes, the leading Dutch organologist and Schnitger specialist, made sure the restoration was done as fundamentally secure as possible by creating the meticulous documentation needed. The result was a collection of more than 60,000 pieces of data.

The discussion regarding the tuning of the organ led to the decision for modified mean tone temperament. It is a compromise between the standard pure thirds of the mean tone tuning and the requirements for playing organ literature from the 17th and 18th centuries in keys that contain multiple sharps/ flats. The discovery of the mean tone temperament was read off of the pipe lengths of the inner pipes of the Principal 32' in the pedal.

The Schnitger organ in Hamburg's main church of St. Jacobi has become one of the most influential models for organ building in the last 100 years.

== Disposition ==
Today's disposition dates back to the restoration of 1993, which in effect restored the state of 1762.

I Rückpositiv CDE–c^{3}
Principal	8′	A
Gedackt	8′	Sch/F
Quintadehna	8′	Sch/F
Octava	4′	F/A
Blockflöht	4′	Sch/F
Querpfeiff	2′	F/A
Octava	2′	F/A
Sexquialtera II		F/A
Scharff VI-VIII		F/A
Siffloit	1^{1}/_{2}′	F
Dulcian	16′	S
Bahrpfeiffe	8′	S/A
Trommet	8′	L/A
Cimbelsterne

II Werck CDEFGA–c^{3}
Principal	16′	A
Quintadehn	16′	F/S
Octava	8′	before Sch/Sch/S
Spitzflöht	8′	S
Viola di Gamba	8′	L
Octava	4′	Sch/S
Rohrflöht	4′	Sch/S
Flachflöht	2′	A
Rauschpfeiff II		Sch/S
Super Octav	2′	S
Mixtur VI-VIII		F/S
Trommet	16′	F/S

III Oberpositiv CDEFGA–c^{3}
Principal	8′	S/A
Rohrflöht	8′	S
Holtzflöht	8′	S
Spitzflöht	4′	S
Octava	4′	Sch
Nasat	3′	S
Octava	2′	S
Gemshorn	2′	Sch/F
Scharff IV-VI		F/A
Cimbel III		S/A
Trommet	8′	S
Vox humana	8′	S
Trommet	4′	S/A

IV Brustpositiv CDEFGA–c^{3}
Principal	8′	F/?
Octav	4′	S/A
Hollflöth	4′	S
Waldtflöht	2′	S
Sexquialtera II		F/Sch
Scharff IV-VI		S
Dulcian	8′	S
Trechter Regal	8′	S

Pedal CD–d^{1}
Principal	32′	A/S
Octava	16′	S
Subbaß	16′	S
Octava	8′	S
Octava	4′	F/?
Nachthorn	2′	S
Rauschpfeiff III		F/S
Mixtur VI-VIII		F/S
Posaune	32′	S
Posaune	16′	S
Dulcian	16′	S
Trommet	8′	S
Trommet	4′	S
Cornet	2′	S

- Couplers: IV/II, II/III
- Two tremulants
- Zimbelstern
- Trommel (Drum)

Sch = Scherer (16th/17th century)
F = Gottfried Fritzsche (1636)
S = Arp Schnitger (1693)
L = Johann Jakob Lehnert (1761)
A = Jürgen Ahrend (1993)

== Technical data ==
- 60 stops, about 4000 pipes
- Wind supply:
  - 12 wind chests (Schnitger)
  - One main valve, five stop valves (Ahrend)
  - 6 wedge bellows (Ahrend)
  - Wind pressure: 80 mm
- Tuning:
  - Pitch: a^{1} = 495.45 Hz at 18 degrees Celsius
  - Modified meantone (−1/5 syntonic comma)

== Bibliography ==
- Cornelius H. Edskes, Harald Vogel, translated by Joel Speerstra (2016): Arp Schnitger and His Work. Bremen: Edition Falkenberg. ISBN 978-3-95494-092-9, pp. 66–69, 178–179.
- Cornelius H. Edskes (1996): Über die Stimmtonhöhe und Temperatur der Arp-Schnitger-Orgel von St. Jacobi in Hamburg. In: Hans Davidsson (ed.): Cornelius H. Edskes doctor honoris causa. Göteborg: Göteborgs universitet, Department of Musicology. ISBN 91-85974-37-4, pp. 19–41.
- Gustav Fock (1974): Arp Schnitger und seine Schule. Ein Beitrag zur Geschichte des Orgelbaues im Nord- und Ostseeküstengebiet. Kassel: Bärenreiter. ISBN 3-7618-0261-7, pp. 240–241.
- Ibo Ortgies (2007): Die Praxis der Orgelstimmung in Norddeutschland im 17. und 18. Jahrhundert und ihr Verhältnis zur zeitgenössischen Musikpraxis. Göteborg: Göteborgs universitet (gbv.de online).
- Heimo Reinitzer (ed.) (1995): Die Arp-Schnitger-Orgel der Hauptkirche St. Jacobi in Hamburg. Hamburg: Christians. ISBN 3-7672-1187-4.
