= Edskes =

Edskes is a Dutch surname. Notable people with the surname include:

- Bernhardt Edskes (1940–2022), Dutch organist and organ builder
- Cor Edskes (1925–2015), Dutch organ builder and organologist
