= Gottfried Fritzsche =

German organ builder (1578–1636)

Gottfried Fritzsche (sometimes spelled Frietzsch) (1578 – 1638) was a German organ builder.

== Life ==
Gottfried Fritzsche (Note: While modern scholarship consistently spells Gottfried's surname Fritzsche, extant documents written by the composer spell his name Frietzsch with an ie instead of an i.) was born in Meissen in 1578. He was the son of goldsmith Jobst Fritzsche (died 1585), and began his professional life learning and working in his father's craft. His grandfather Johannes Fritzsche (1508-1586) was cathedral syndic in Meissen.

Before 1603 Fritzsche probably learned organ building from Johann Lange (sometimes given as Hans Lange) in Kamenz. Fritzsche was an organ builder in Meissen from 1604 until 1612 when he relocated to Dresden. There he was appointed court organ builder to the Elector of Saxony around 1614. From 1619 to 1627, he worked in Wolfenbüttel and from 1628 to 1629 in Celle, before coming to Ottensen in 1629. He succeeded Hans Scherer the Younger in Hamburg upon Scherer's death in 1631, taking over the Scherer family's organ business. He remained there until his death in 1638.

His first marriage to a woman who is no longer known by name produced three sons and three daughters, including the organ builder Hans Christoph Fritzsche. Through his second marriage in 1629 to Margarete née Ringemuth, widowed Rist, he became the stepfather of the poet Johann Rist. His pupils (and later sons-in-law) were Friederich Stellwagen and Tobias Brunner.

== Work ==
Fritzsche stood on the threshold from the Renaissance to the early Baroque. He further developed Brabant organ building and introduced numerous innovations, for example, on the Zungenregister the rackett regals such as dulzian, regal, sordun and the long-beaked crumhorn. Fritzsche not infrequently placed stops of the same stop family but with contrasting scales (wide and narrow) in one work or chose unusual foot pitches. In the Brustwerk and pedal he regularly used one-foot voices, which were still unknown with Scherer. Also characteristic is his double zill, which takes the place of Scherer's high-lying Scharff, as well as the use of various aliquotregister as single voices. For example, the simbel installed by Fritzsche in 1635 in the organ of the St. James' Church, Hamburg was the first of its kind in northern Germany. He also liked to use secondary stops such as tremulant and "drum", which do not yet appear in Scherer's work, and Effect stops such as "Cuckoo", "Birdsong", and "Nightingale". While hammered lead pipes had been the rule in northern Germany until then, Fritzsche planed the pipes and used an alloy with a higher tin content; for the cups of the trombones and trumpets he added marcasite. Compared to Scherer, the use of Subsemitones (double upper keys) was new. During his time in Hamburg, he carried out alterations to the organs of all four main churches. Fritzsche's extensions made the organs in St. Jacobi and St. Katharinen among the first organs ever to have four manuals.

Fritzsche died in Ottensen, modern-day Hamburg.

== List of work ==
Year	Location	Church	Picture	Manual	Stops	Notes
1603	Meissen	Meissen Cathedral		II/P	17	Swallow's nest organ; destroyed by lightning on 27 April 1647.
1609–1610	Meißen	Frauenkirche				not preserved
1612–1614	Dresden	Schlosskapelle		II/P	33	in collaboration with Hans Leo Hassler; transferred to St. Matthew's Church in 1737; not preserved; disposition by Michael Praetorius: Syntagma Musicum. Vol. 2: De Organographia
1615–1617	Sondershausen	Trinitatiskirche		II/P	33	Burnt in 1621
1617	Wolfenbüttel	St. Trinitatis		II/P	21	Originally built for the castle chapel Schöningen; transferred and rebuilt in 1722/23; façade preserved much altered
1618–1619	Bayreuth	Stadtkirche		II/P	35	not preserved
1621–1622	Harbke	St. Levin		I/P	18	Addition of a rückpositiv by Christoph Treutmann in 1728; front and pipe material preserved.
1619–1623	Wolfenbüttel	Marienkirche		III/P	39	Reconstructed front and 6 stops preserved
1621–1623	Braunschweig	St. Katharinen		III/P		6 stops preserved and integrated in the new building by Rudolf von Beckerath Orgelbau (1980)
1622–1625	Clauen	Village church		I/p		Originally built for Wolfenbüttel Castle Church; rebuilt by Johann Andreas Graff in 1725/26; transferred to Clauen in 1796; baroque facade and parts of pipework and wind chests preserved; restored by Bernhardt Edskes in 1995
1620er	Coswig	Alte Kirche		I	9	Builder unknown, possibly Frietzsch or Tobias Weller; moved to Coswig around 1735, repainted in 1760; preserved → Orgel
1626–1627	Braunschweig	St.-Ulrici-Kirche		III/P	26	not preserved
1627	Dresden?			I	1	Attribution; positiv with parchment pipes; today preserved in the Victoria and Albert Museum..
1629–1630	Hamburg	Maria Magdalena		II/P	23	not preserved
1630	Hamburg-Ottensen	Christianskirche				Extension conversion of an older organ; some stops taken over in 1744/1745 in new building by Johann Dietrich Busch.
1630	Hamburg	Ehemalige Hauptkirche Sankt Nikolai				Transfer from the space above the north door to a new gallery "under the tower in the west"; extension and conversion of unknown size.
1624–1631	Torgau	Torgauer Schlosskapelle				not preserved
1630–1631	Braunschweig	St. Martini		II/P	24	Draft for a disposition, which Jonas Weigel executed in a modified form
1632	Hamburg	Hauptkirche Sankt Katharinen		IV/P	56	Extension reconstruction; Frietzsch pipes in four Brustwerk stops preserved; 2013 reconstruction of the state of 1720 (photo)
1633–1634	Hamburg	St.-Petri-Kirche		IV/P (three manuals)		Renovation, extension and conversion. New: Brustwerk (attached to Oberwerk), all Rückpositiv stops, individual stops in Hauptwerk and pedal. New keyboards or extension of the manual range up to c^{3}, with divided upper keys, sub-semitones, in all (linkable) manual keyboards for the additional notes dis, as und ais. Not preserved.
1634	Neuengamme	St. Johannis		I/P		1803 by Johann Paul Geycke and later rebuilt several times; 5 stops complete and 6 partly preserved.
1634	Altengamme	St. Nicolai				New building; replaced by Johann Dietrich Busch in 1751
1635–1636	Hamburg	St.-Jacobi-Kirche		IV/P	56	Expansion to four manuals with a range of 4 octaves (in the Rückpositiv from dis° up to and including dis^{2} seven divided upper keys, subsemitones, for the additional notes dis, as and ais); during the new construction in 1693, Schnitger took over 20 stops from Frietzsch in varying ranges.
1637	Hamburg-Allermöhe	Dreieinigkeitskirche				New building; later rebuilt several times, front burnt in 1900.
1636–1638	Trittau				12	remained unfinished.
1637–1638	Borstel (Jork)	St. Nikolai		II/P	etwa 20	Repair of the organ by an unknown builder (2nd half of the 16th century); organ rebuilt several times, intervened in 1770-1772 by Johann Paul Geycke, who also created a new casing; soundboards of two reed stops by Frietzsch preserved.
