= Organ in the Jacobikerk at Uithuizen =

Coordinates: 53°24′26.5″N 6°40′25″E

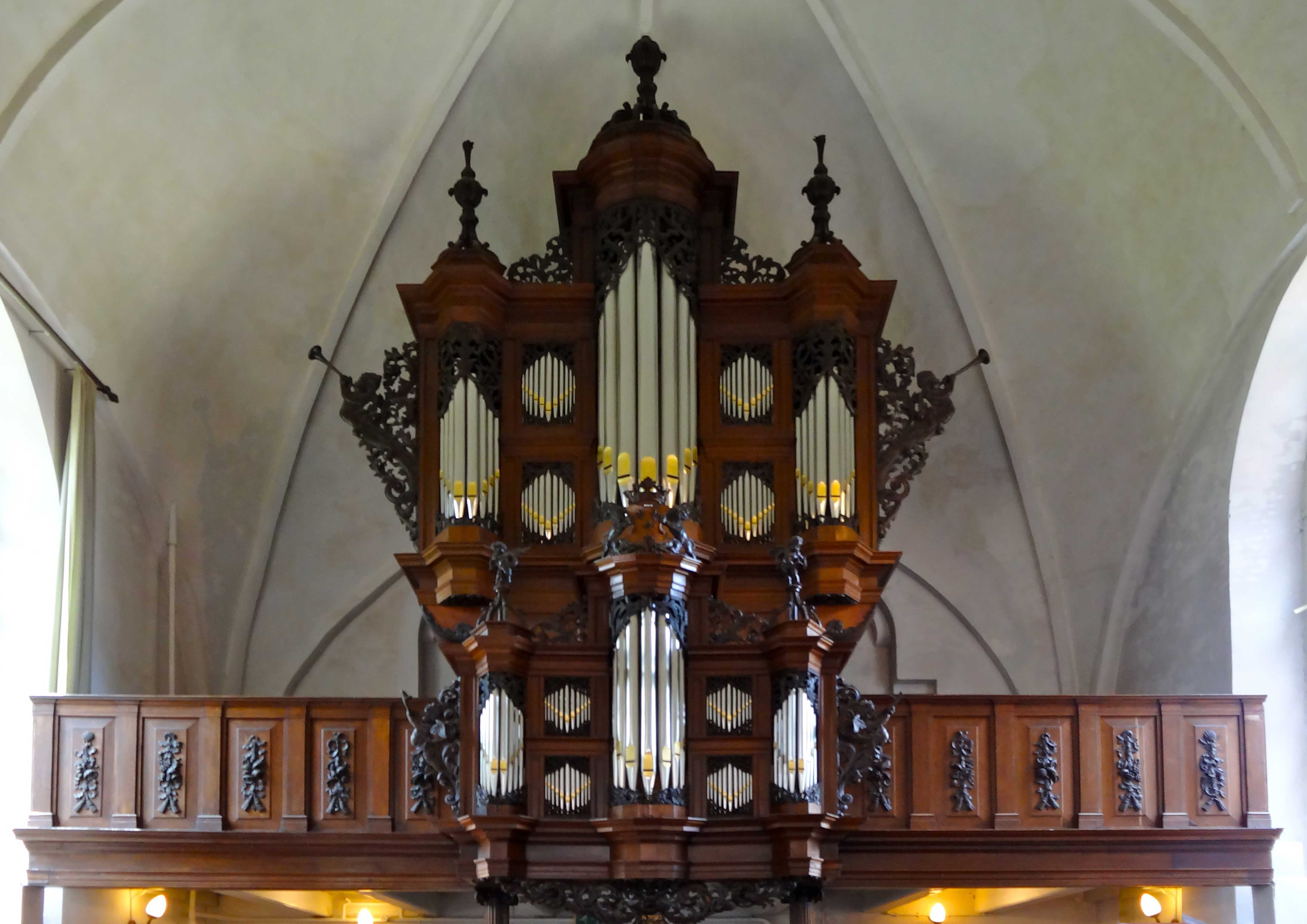
The Arp Schnitger Organ at Uithuizen

The Jacobikerk organ in Uithuizen in the Dutch province of Groningen was built in 1701 by Arp Schnitger. It has 28 stops which are distributed on two manuals and pedal. The instrument is one of the best preserved Schnitger organs. The organ has been used as a template for newly built organs in the 20th century and for the reconstruction of lost stops of other Schnitger organs.

== Building History ==
=== New construction by Schnitger 1701 ===
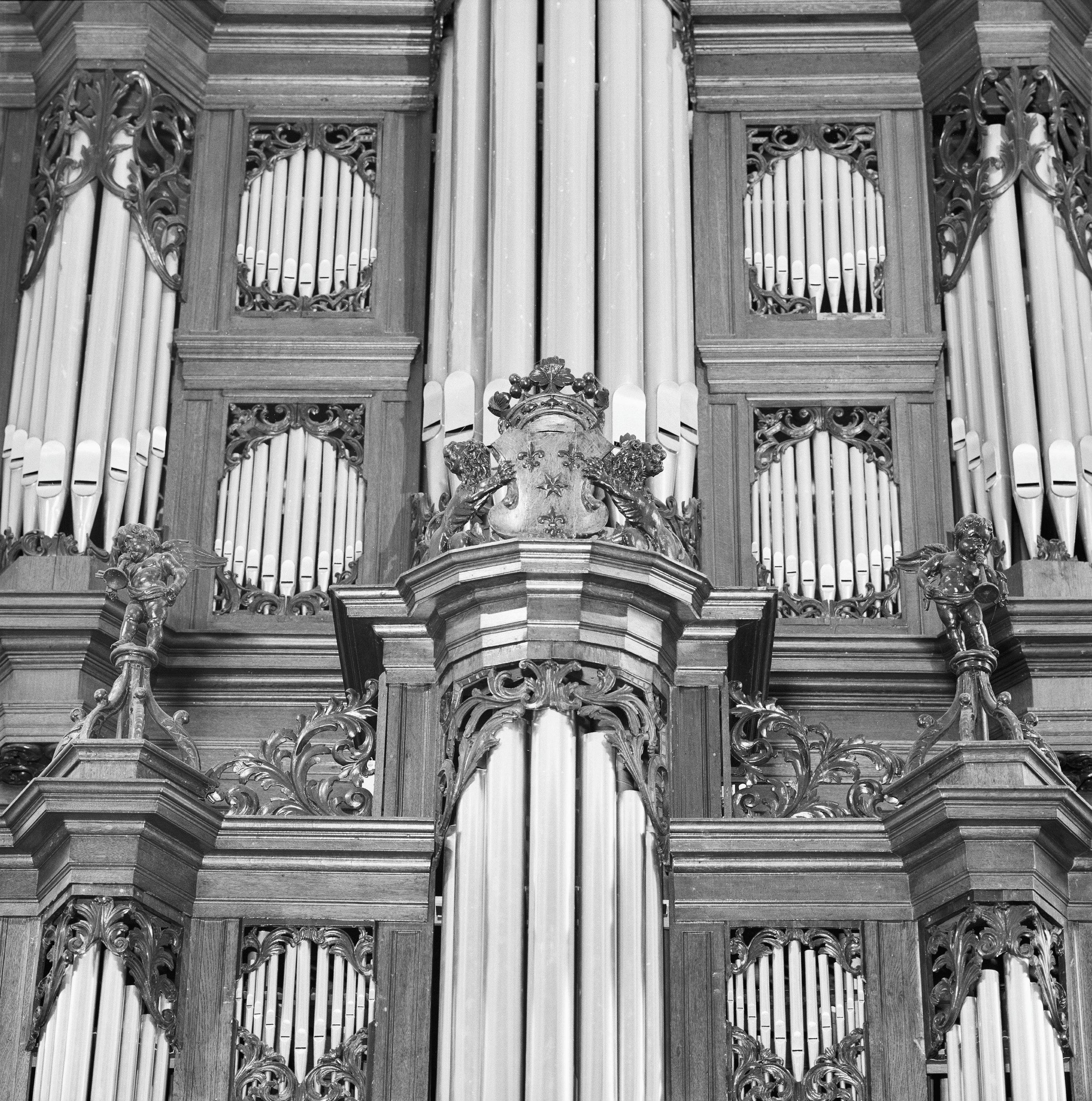
Carving on the Rückpositive with crowned van Menkema family coat-of-arms

Bills for organ repairs dating from the second half of the 17th century are in evidence and point to the existence of an organ. However, Schnitger took over no stops for his new organ from the previous organ. The congregation finalized a contract with Schnitger on 26 April 1699 for a new organ with 27 stops. For wages and material 1600 Caroligulden were agreed, with the furniture maker Allert Meijer to receive 900 Caroligulden for the organ case and the gallery. Schnitger built an additional stop at his own expense, so that the organ included 28 stops at the time of acceptance. Schnitger commented on the merits of his organs in Uithuizen and Groningen (Academiekerk): "I do not deserve anything from these two works, because I had two rogues and idlers in those places who probably consumed a lot, but have not earned anything for me. God will give them their reward." The pedal was placed behind the main body. In its day, the organ in Uithuizen was the largest Dutch village organ.

The case of Meijer is extremely artfully executed. In the 19th century, the woody oak wood was given a dark brown varnish. The I Manual case finds its reduced equivalent in the Rückpositiv case on the gallery rail. Both manual cases are five sections with a high, polygonal center tower and two side towers in trapezoidal shape. This form is unusual for Schnitger, who otherwise used pointed side towers. The three pipe towers are connected by two-story flat fields. The upper flat fields in the I Manual are mute and in the Rückpositiv, the lower ones. In each of the four side towers the outermost pipe is mute. Of the 67 façade pipes, 43 are sounding.

The center tower of the Rückpositiv is crowned with the coat of arms of the patronage family, Alberda van Menkema. Two upright lions hold a shield. The lateral carvings show openwork acanthus tendrils with volutes that merge into musical angelic figures. Acanthus foliage is located on the case above the flat fields and encloses the entire Rückpositiv above and below the pipe fields. The carvings are attributed to Jan de Rijk.

=== Later work ===
Albertus Antonius Hinsz repaired the instrument in 1747 and restored it in 1785. He renewed the manual and pedal keyboards and added the missing semitones in the bass octave through octave coupling. The Rückpositiv was now playable from the second manual. The organ sound did not change with Hinsz. In the years 1800 and 1811 Dirk Lohman carried out repairs. Stronger interventions were made by Petrus van Oeckelen in the years 1854 to 1856. He replaced ten stops in whole or in part, renewed the manual windchest (I Manual), which contained the previously missing half-tones in the bass octave, and broadened the lower case and the pedal. In 1891, the same workshop replaced Schnitger's four wedge bellows with vertical reservoir bellows.

=== Restoration ===
In a first construction phase in 1987, Bernhardt Edskes returned the Rückpositiv to its original state. Five stops were reconstructed using the preserved materials, as well as the wedge bellows and manual keyboards. In a second phase from 1999 to 2000, Edskes restored the I Manual and Pedal including the housing. Three lost stops have been completely reconstructed, including the façade pipes with gilded labia, and three stops partially reconstructed.

== Disposition ==
The 2011 state of the organ shows the original disposition:

I Manuael CDE–c^{3}
| Praestant | 8′ | S/E |
| Holpyp | 8′ | S |
| Octaav | 4′ | S |
| Spitsfluyt | 4′ | S |
| Quint | 3′ | S |
| Superoctaav | 2′ | S/E |
| Siflet | 1 1/3′ | S/E |
| Mixtuer IV–V | | S |
| Trompet | 8′ | E |
| Vox Humana | 8′ | S |

II Rughposityf CDEFGA–c^{3}
| Praestant | 4′ | S/E |
| Holpyp | 8′ | S |
| Quintadena | 8′ | S/E |
| Holpyp | 4′ | S |
| Octaav | 2′ | S/E |
| Woudfluyt | 2′ | S |
| Quint | 1 1/2′ | S |
| Sesquialter II | | S |
| Scherp IV | | E |
| Dulciaan | 8′ | S |

Pedael CDE–d^{1}
| Bourdon | 16′ | S/E |
| Octaav | 8′ | S |
| Octaav | 4′ | S |
| Nachthoorn | 2′ | S |
| Mixtuer IV | | E |
| Basuyn | 16′ | S |
| Trompet | 8′ | S |
| Cornet | 2′ | S |

- Couplers: II/I (sliding coupler)
- Tremulant, calcant bell
- 3 check valves, exhaust valve

S = Schnitger (1701)
E = Edskes (1987/2001)

== Technical data ==
- 28 stops, 39 ranks of pipes
- Wind system:
  - 3 wedge bellows (Edskes)
  - 3 check valves (ventils)
  - Wind pressure: 66.5 mm
- Windchests: Rückpositiv and Pedal (Schnitger), I Manual (Edskes)
- Mechanism/Action:
  - Keyboards (Hinsz 1785)
  - Key action: Mechanical
  - Stop action: Mechanical
- Temperament:
  - Vallotti tuning (^{1}/_{6}th comma)
  - Pitch: one semitone above a1 = 440 Hz

== Bibliography ==
- Peter van Dijk, ed. (2004). Een pronkjuweel op het Hogeland. Het Arp Schnitger-orgel te Uithuizen. Zutphen: Walburg Pers. ISBN 90-5730-310-8 [8 articles & English language summary, pp. 201–205].
- Cornelius H. Edskes, Harald Vogel, translated by Joel Speerstra (2016). Arp Schnitger and his Work. Bremen: Edition Falkenberg. ISBN 978-3-95494-092-9, pp. 66–69, 178–179.
- Gustav Fock (1974). Arp Schnitger und seine Schule. Ein Beitrag zur Geschichte des Orgelbaues im Nord- und Ostseeküstengebiet. Kassel: Bärenreiter. ISBN 3-7618-0261-7, pp. 240–241.
