= Christoph Treutmann =

German organ builder (c. 1673–1757)

Christoph Treutmann (c. 1673 – 10 June 1757), also Christoph Treutmann der Ältere unlike his son of the same name, was a German organ builder of the Baroque period. He learned in Magdeburg from Heinrich Herbst and also founded his own workshop there. His most important surviving work is the great organ of the Stiftskirche Grauhof.

== Life ==
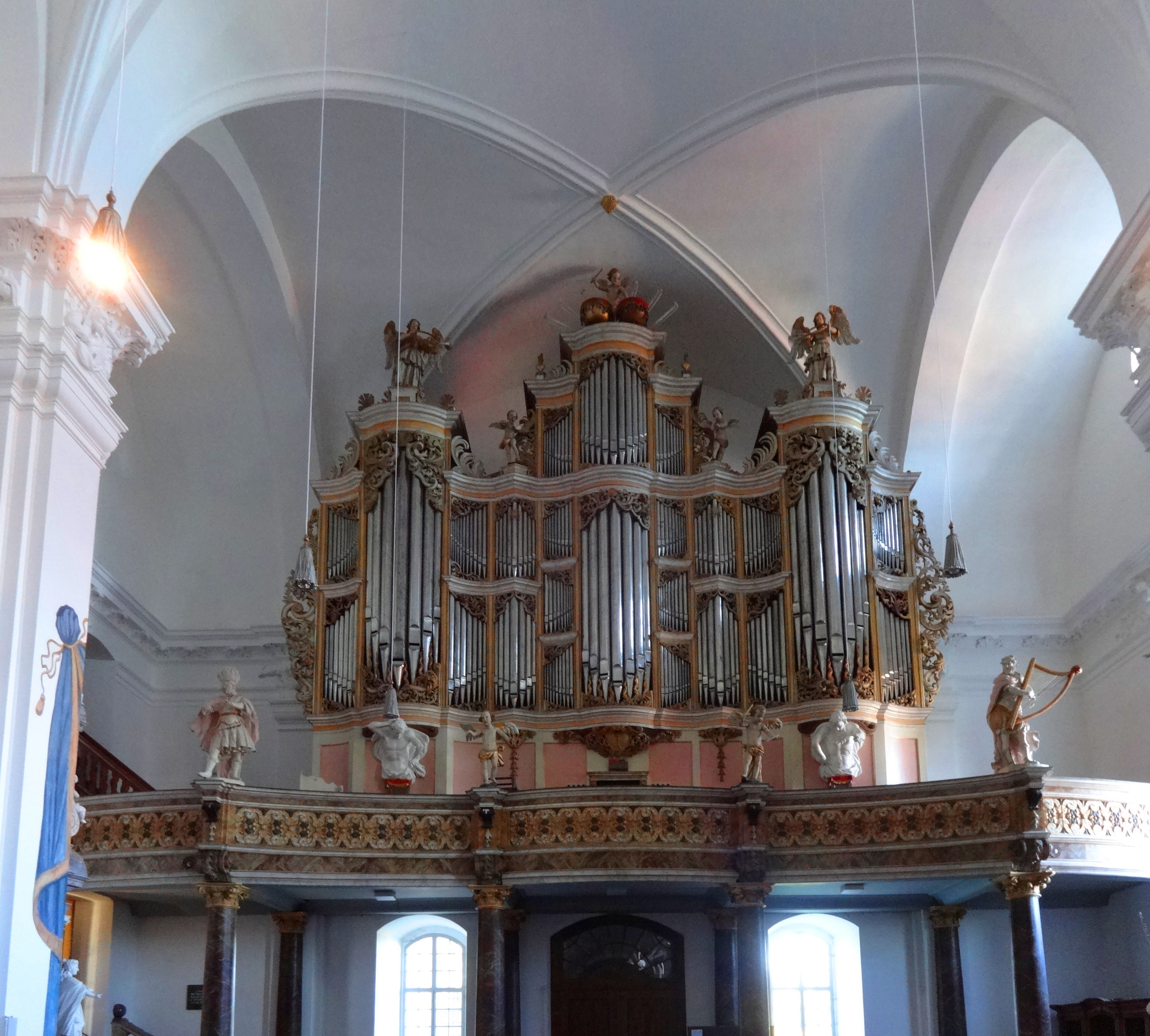
Treutmann-Orgel in der Stiftskirche St. Georg, Goslar-Grauhof

Born in Silesia, Treutmann learned his trade from the Herbst family of organ builders in Magdeburg, Duchy of Magdeburg. His teacher was Heinrich Herbst the Younger, the son of Heinrich Herbst the Elder. Herbst (the Younger) later built the cathedral organ in Halberstadt between 1714 and 1718. Since Treutmann's works show stylistic similarities to the organs of the Hamburg organ builder Arp Schnitger, it is assumed that Treutmann worked at least temporarily with the latter as a journeyman and possibly also participated in the construction of the "Arp Schnitger organ" (1689 to 1694) in the St.-Johannis-Kirche in Magdeburg.

In 1695, Treutmann became self-employed and founded his own workshop around 1700. His first independent work is known to be the repair of the Brunswick Cathedral in 1700. After that, the repair of an organ built by Gottfried Fritzsche in 1637 in the Dreieinigkeitskirche in Allermöhe near Hamburg is attested. Further works are known from the year 1713 in the Magdeburg area. Between 1721 and 1723 Treutmann built the organs of the churches of St. Marien and St. Nikolai in Gardelegen; subsequently he extended the organ of the Schloss Harbke in Harbke near Helmstedt, also a work by Gottfried Fritzsche from 1621/22.

In 1732, he worked again in Magdeburg and built an organ for the French Reformed congregation there. The Kloster Grauhof near Goslar commissioned Treutmann in 1734 to build an organ with a total of 42 stops and 2500 pipes. It was completed in 1737 and is considered his most important work; it was restored from 1989 to 1992. In 1741, Treutmann was again commissioned to repair an organ by Arp Schnitger in the St.-Jacobi-Kirche and reworked another of Schnitger's works in the St.-Johannis-Kirche in Magdeburg between 1747 and 1750.

Treutmann died in Magdeburg.

== Work (selection) ==
Treutmann organs were built for:

- 1721–1723: St. Marien und St. Nikolai (Gardelegen)
- 1725: St. Eustachius (Diesdorf, Magdeburg)
- 1727–1728: St.-Levin-Kirche (Schloss Harbke)
- 1734–1737: Stiftskirche St. Georg (Grauhof, Goslar)
- 1742: St.-Georgs-Kirche (Calvörde)
