= Hans Christoph Fritzsche =

German organ builder (died 1674)

Hans Christoph Fritzsche (before 1629 – 1674 in Hamburg) was a German organ builder from Dresden who worked in northern Germany, Denmark and southern Sweden.

== Life ==
Fritzsche was the son of the organ builder Gottfried Fritzsche from his first marriage. In 1655, he established his workshop in Copenhagen. There were family ties to Friederich Stellwagen, as he married Fritzsche's sister Theodora. His son-in-law Hans Heinrich Cahman married his daughter Anna Christina and continued the business after Fritzsche died during work on the new building in Hamburg-Neuenfelde.

== Proven works ==
Year	Location	Church	Picture	Manual	Stops	Notes
1646	Handorf	St. Marien			13	New building; some stops preserved
1647–1649	Cuxhaven-Altenbruch	St.-Nicolai-Kirche		II/P	25	Extension conversion; after further enlargement by Johann Hinrich Klapmeyer (1727-1730) III/P/35 (present condition); 12-16 stops preserved by Fritzsche
1651 (ca.)	Lisbon					Delivery of an organ of unknown size
1652	Oederquart	St. Johannis		III/P		Including 10 stops of the predecessor organ (1581, badly damaged in 1632); 1678-1682 extension by Arp Schnitger, who moved the organ from the choir loft to the north loft; nothing has survived of the Fritzsche organ.
1653	Oberndorf (Oste)	St.-Georgskirche				Later replaced
1655	Hamburg	St. James' Church, Hamburg		IV/P	53 ?	1655-1658 major renovation work for the 1656 Lübische Mark; → main article: Orgel der Hauptkirche Sankt Jacobi
1655	Copenhagen	Trinitatis Church		III/P	42	New building
1662	Helsingør	Marienkirche		II/P	24	Reconstruction of the Lorentz organ (1634-1636) by order of Dietrich Buxtehude; only the front pipes of the Rückpositiv are preserved.
1662/63?	Helsingborg	Sankt-Marien-Kirche		II/P	24	Work commissioned by Dietrich Buxtehude. The organ was sold to the church of Torrlösa in 1849.
1666	Halmstad (Schweden)			II/P	24	New building
1670–1671	St. Catherine's Church, Hamburg			IV/P		Extension of the pedal by principal 32' and trombone 32'; the work was not completed (Fritzsche received a payment of 960 Mark lüb.). The work was completed in 1671-1674 during the extension to IV/P 58 by Johann Friedrich Besser (before 1640-1693). ausgeführt.
1671	Dömitz	Johanneskirche		II/p	13	New building
1673	Hamburg-Neuenfelde	St. Pankratius-Kirche				Completed by Cahman. Later taken by Arp Schnitger to Stade (castle church) and subsequently sold to Bremen. In his new construction, Schnitger integrated older material from two stops by Fritzsche.
