= Tobias Brunner =

German organ builder

Tobias Brunner (baptised 23 August 1602 – c. 1665) was a German organ builder of the Baroque period.

== Life ==
Brunner was baptised in a document on 23 August 1602 in Hormersdorf (Saxony). He was apprenticed to the organ builder Gottfried Fritzsche in Ottensen. As a journeyman of Gottfried Fritzsche, he was involved in building the organ for the main church Beatae Mariae Virginis in Wolfenbüttel from 1620 to 1624 and the organ in St. Maria Magdalena in Hamburg in 1629..

On 24 April 1631, he married his master's daughter Sybilla in Ottensen, and around 1632 he moved to Lunden (according to church records there, he had 5 children baptised in Lunden) and maintained an organ-building workshop there, presumably until his death.

Today, two organs built by Tobias Brunner are still preserved. The one in the St.-Martins-Kirche in Tellingstedt from 1642 is the oldest playable organ in Schleswig-Holstein. A second one stands in the Sankt-Secundus church in Hennstedt (Schleswig-Holstein).

Brunner probably died around 1665.
