= Johann Paul Geycke =

German organ builder (1726–1804)

Johann Paul Geycke (1726 – 1804 in Hamburg) was a Hamburg organ builder of the 18th century.

Geycke ran his own workshop in Hamburg. Georg Wilhelm Wilhelmy (1748–1806) was his journeyman. From 1765 onwards, Geycke succeeded in persuading the itzehoer organ builder Johann Daniel Busch (1735–1787) from Hamburg.

His son Joachim Wilhelm Geycke (1768–1840) continued his father's workshop. His grandson was the Hamburg organ builder Christian Heinrich Wolfsteller (1830–1897), his son-in-law the organ builder Balthasar Wohlien (1745–1804) from the well-known Altonaer Wohlien family of organ builders.

== Work ==
Year	Location	Building	Picture	Manual	Stops	Notes
1752	Kirchwerder	St. Severini		II/P		Repair of the organ by Hinrich Speter (1641)
1763	Eppendorf	Sankt Johannis				Repair and take over maintenance.
1765–76 / 1780	Hamm	Dreifaltigkeitskirche				Maintenance of the organ from 1765 to 1776, in 1780 estimate for repair, then repair and renewal of some of the stops.
1766/70–72	Borstel (Jork)	Sankt Nikolai		II/P	20	1766 Repairs: bellows, ducts, windchests, action, musical keyboards, tremulant and reeds are repaired. In 1770–72, the organ was completely rebuilt and moved to the west gallery; in addition, the organ received a new casing, two additional bellows, new channels, two new pedal chests, a new action, a new 16' Trombone and 8' Octave in the pedal were installed; the Cornet 2' (ped) is changed to the Trumpet 4'; the Principal 8' in the HW is foiled and the BW doors receive foiled blind pipes; all works receive a valve and the Zimbelsterns are installed in the bass towers.
1768	Hamburg-Altstadt	Sankt Petri				Repair.
1768	St. Pauli	Pesthofkirche, Annenstraße				New building.
1774–75	Hamburg-Altstadt	Sankt Jacobi		IV/P	60	Repair and installation of a new console with four manuals. → Schnitger organ (Hamburg)
1777/1796	Altona	Sankt Trinitatis				Repair.
