= Regina Stegemann =

German organ builder (born 1951)

Regina Stegemann (born 1951 in Göttingen) is an organ builder from East Frisia who specialises in the restoration of historic organs, but also carries out maintenance and rebuilding work. New builds are carried out exclusively with mechanical slider chests. Her area of work is concentrated on East Frisia, the Oldenburg Land and the Wesermarsch.

She learned organ building in the 1970s at the Werner Bosch Orgelbau company (Kassel) and Rudolf Janke and was a journeywoman with Gerald Woehl until 1984 (Marburg), with whom she also took the master craftsman's examination (1990). From 1985 to 1991, she led the "Krummhörner Orgelwerkstatt" in Greetsiel, a collective of young organ builders (Bartelt Immer, Hero Bödeker, Martin and Wilfried Fooken). Their own workshop was founded in 1991 and is located in Tannenhausen, a district of Aurich.

Jürgen Kopp joined Stegemann in 1987 from Jürgen Ahrend for a few years before becoming a self-employed professional. After passing his master craftsman's examination in 1995, he worked in their workshop from 1996 to 2000, specialising, among other things, in the construction of chest organs. In 2000, Kopp took over the entire business in Tannenhausen. Stegemann continued to use the workshop for her own organ building projects and was a temporary employee in his business until Koop's death in June 2014.

== Work (selection) ==
Year	Location	Church	Picture	Manual	Stops	Notes
1985	Critzum	Critzumer Kirche		I/p	6	The organ with neo-Gothic facade was built in 1939 by the Eberhard Friedrich Walcker company, which rebuilt an original school organ from the beginning of the 19th century by Christian Heinrich Wolfsteller.
1987	Mackenrode	Mackenroder Kirche		I/p	4	New building; in Kirchdorf a larger instrument was built according to a similar concept.
1987–1988	Landschaftspolder	Landschaftspolder Kirche		I/p	5	New organ behind historic facade by Gerhard Janssen Schmid (1814) (Krummhörner Orgelwerkstatt)
1987–1988	Midlum	Midlumer Kirche		I/p	9	Restoration of the organ by Hinrich Just Müller (1766) (Krummhörner Orgelwerkstatt) → Orgel der Midlumer Kirche
1988–1989	Aurich-Kirchdorf	St. Paulus		I/P	7	New construction by the Krummhörner Orgelwerkstatt
1989	Böhmerwold	Böhmerwolder Kirche		I/p	7	Restoration of the organ by Johann Gottfried Rohlfs (1828) (Krummhörner Orgelwerkstatt)
1989	Petkum	St.-Antonius-Kirche		II/p	14	Restoration of the organ by Valentin Ulrich Grotian (1694–1699) (Krummhörner Orgelwerkstatt)
1989–1990	Suurhusen	Suurhuser Kirche		II/P	7	Repair of the organ by Gustav Brönstrup (1959); previously as house organ in Oldenburg (Pedagogical Academy) and then in Detern (Krummhörner Orgelwerkstatt)
1990	Rotenburg	Stadtkirche		I	3	New construction of a chest organ (masterpiece); stops made of wood (8', 4', 2'); tuning pitches a' = 415 Hz bzw. 440 Hz
1990	Brackwede	Bartholomäus-Kirche		I/P	5	Overhaul and New Intonation of the positive by Eberhard Friedrich Walcker (ca. 1965)
1990	Greetsiel	Greetsieler Kirche		I/p	6	Restoration of the organ by Karl Schuke Berliner Orgelbauwerkstatt (1963) behind historic facade of Johann Friedrich Constabel (1738) by the Krummhörner Orgelwerkstatt
1990–1991	Holtgaste	Liudgeri-Kirche		I/p	7	Restoration of the organ by Arnold Rohlfs (1864-1865) (Krummhörner Orgelwerkstatt) → Orgel der Liudgeri-Kirche (Holtgaste)
1991–1992	Sattenhausen	Ev.-ref. Kirche		I/P	9	Restoration of the organ by Johann Wilhelm Schmerbach the Middle (1789-1790), which underwent intervening alterations
1992–1993	Aurich-Sandhorst	St. Johannis		II/P	17	Re-intonation of the organ by Karl Schuke Berliner Orgelbauwerkstatt (1966-1972) and extension by one stop which had remained vacant in 1972
1993–1994	Oldendorp	Oldendorper Kirche		I/p	9	Restoration of the organ of the Gebr. Rohlfs (1870)
?	Private			I	3?	New construction of a chest organ
1997	Ditzumerverlaat	Reformierte Kirche		II/P	9	Overhaul of the organ by Ernst Leeflang (1970) and exchange of stops
1999	Elisabethfehn	Christuskirche		II/P	14	Overhaul of the Walcker organ (1970)
1999	Rodenkirchen	Gemeindehaus		I	3	New construction of a positive with wooden stops
2002–2008	Jade	Trinitatiskirche		II/P	21	Restoration of the organ by Johann Dietrich Busch (1739)
2007 or 2008	Engerhafe	St. Johannes der Täufer		I/p	9	Restoration of the organ by Gebrüder Hillebrand Orgelbau (1971-1973) behind facade by Hinrich Just Müller (1774–1775)
2009	Ditzum	Ditzumer Kirche		II/P	13	Repair and retoning of the organ of Karl Schuke (1965)
