= Johann Dietrich Busch =

German organ builder (1700–1753)

Johann Dietrich Busch (27 December 1700 – 18 July 1753) was a German organ builder.

== Life ==
Born in Mesmerode, Wunstorf, Busch was probably a pupil of Arp Schnitger. After Schnitger's death in 1719, he continued his work in the workshop of the Itzeho organ builder Lambert Daniel Kastens, who had himself been a journeyman master of Schnitger. From 1728, Busch was in charge of Kastens' Itzeho workshop, as the latter had in the meantime moved the headquarters of his workshop to Copenhagen. In 1733, Busch married Katharina Schütte there, who came from Itzehoe and was in turn Kastens' sister-in-law.

As an independent master craftsman, Busch dominated organ building in and around Hamburg in the period between 1733 and 1753. There is also evidence of numerous repairs, conversions and maintenance contracts in the duchies of Schleswig and Holstein as well as in the Oldenburg region.

After his premature death, his son Johann Daniel Busch took over the workshop and completed the work that his father had begun in Dybbøl Sogn and Højer Sogn.

Bush died in Itzehoe at the age of 52.

== Work (selection) ==
Busch can be traced back to the following new organ builds:

| Year | Location | Building | Picture | Manual | Stops | Notes |
|---|---|---|---|---|---|---|
| 1730 | Hamburg | Reformierte Kirche | | | | |
| 1731–1732 | Schleswig | Schleswig Cathedral | | II/P | 38 | Extension of the organ (II/P/29) by 4 stops in the Hauptwerk and 5 in the pedal. (?) |
| 1737 | Wardenburg | Marienkirche | | II/P | 13 | New building; façade and various pipe material preserved |
| 1737 | Idensen | St. Ursula (Sigwardskirche) | | | | Not preserved |
| 1738 | Altenhuntorf | St.-Jacobi-Kirche | | II/P | 12 | New building; replaced by Johann Martin Schmid in 1908 |
| 1738 | Husby | St.-Vincentius-Kirche | | | | Not preserved |
| 1737–1739 | Jade | Trinitatiskirche | | II/P | 21 | New construction using older parts; façade and various pipe material preserved; 2002-2008 restoration by Regina Stegemann. |
| 1739 | Hamburg-Billwerder | St. Nikolai | | | | New building; destroyed in the fire of the church in 1911 |
| 1739–1740 | Munkbrarup | Laurentiuskirche | | | | Façade preserved |
| 1740 | Broager (DK) | St. Marien | | | | Façade and various pipe material preserved |
| 1741–1742 | Hamburg | Hauptkirche Sankt Katharinen | | IV/P | 58 | Umbau |
| 1741–1743 | Grundhof | St. Marienkirche | | | | Several times rebuilt |
| 1743–1744 | Hamburg-Altona | St. Trinitatis | | | | Neubau; 1943 zerstört |
| 1743–1745 | Hamburg | Neues Hiobshospital | | | | New building |
| 1744–1745 | Hamburg-Ottensen | Christianskirche | | | | New building; façade and various pipe material preserved |
| 1744–1747 | Hamburg-St.Georg | Dreieinigkeitskirche | | III/P | 49 | New building; Replaced by new building by Ernst Röver in 1888/89 |
| 1749 | Uetersen | Klosterkirche | | II/P | 31 | New construction using older stops; façade and various pipe material preserved |
| 1751 | Altengamme | St.-Nicolai-Kirche | | II/P | 24 | New construction; façade and various pipe material preserved |
| 1752 | Kirchwerder | St. Severini | | II/P | | Repair of the organ by Hinrich Speter (1641) |
| 1752 | Dybbøl Sogn | Dybbøl Church | | | | New building; completed after his death by Johann Daniel Busch; the facade (1752) is preserved and houses an organ (1976/2012) by Marcussen & Søn |
