= Bernhardt Edskes =

Dutch organist and organ builder (1940–2022)

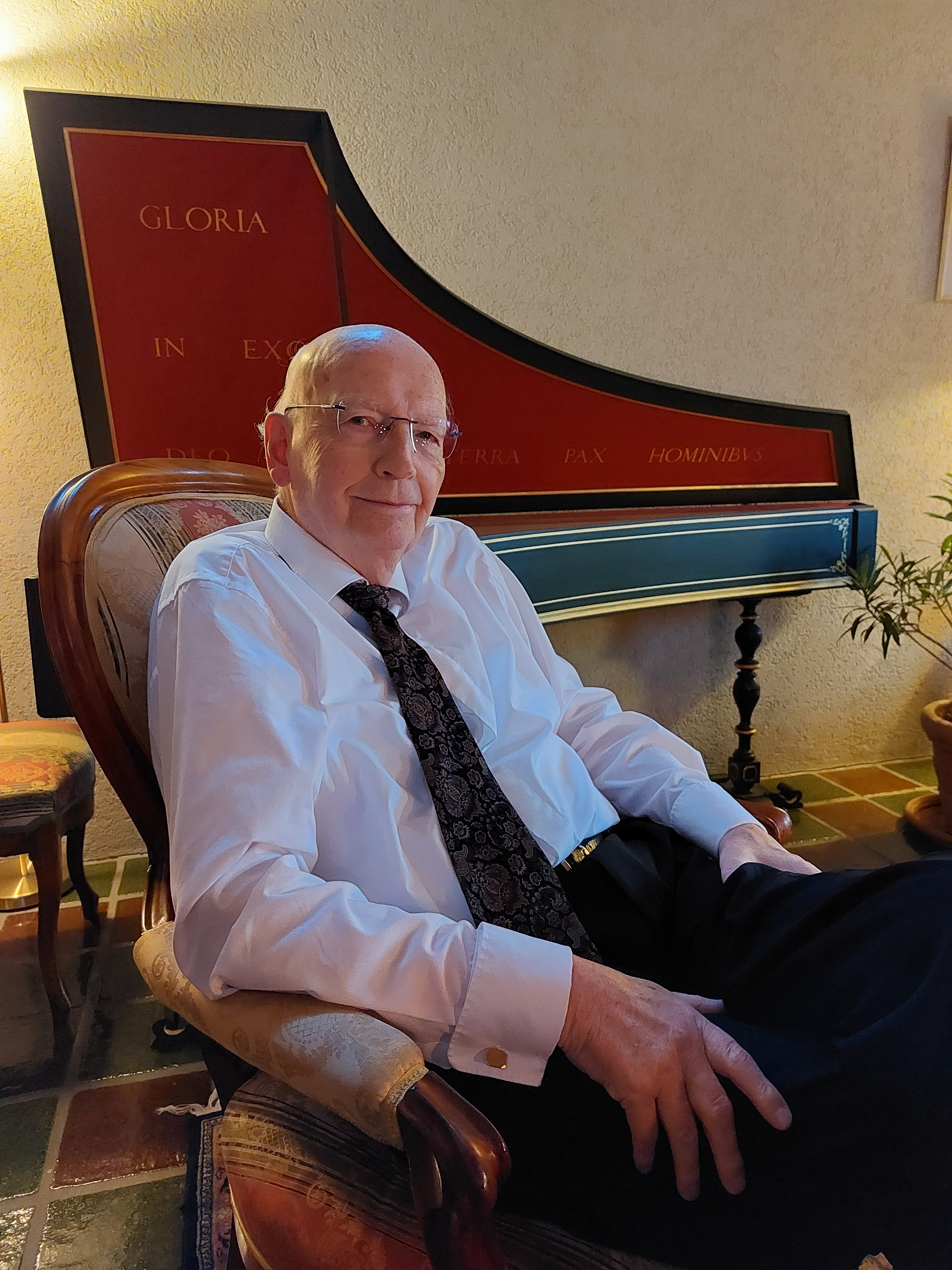
- Born: 28 October 1940
- Died: 21 September 2022 (aged 81)
- Occupations: Organist, organ builder

Bernhardt Hilbrand Edskes (28 October 1940 – 21 September 2022) was a Dutch-Swiss organist and organ builder based in Wohlen.

== Life ==
Edskes was born to Albert Hendrik Edskes and Grietje de Graaf, and grew up in Groningen as the youngest of four musical brothers. He received piano and organ lessons from the first grade onwards and became assistant organist at the organ at the Dorpskerk at Noordbroek at the age of 13 and principal organist at the Organ in the Jacobikerk at Uithuizen at the age of 15. In addition to music, he was also interested in painting and drawing, which he deepened at the Groningen Academy of Fine Arts.

As a result of the North Sea flood of 1953, numerous new organs had to be built in the Netherlands, for which the Swiss company Metzler received orders. Edskes designed several new organs for this firm. In 1963, he moved to Switzerland and became artistic director for exterior design and tonal conception at Metzler. In 1966, he married Doris Edskes née Utzinger Alber, a federally certified structural draughtswoman, with whom he has two daughters. After working for Metzler for twelve years, he set up his own workshop in Wohlen in 1975.

For years, Edskes was chairman of the Swiss Association of Organists and lecturer in organ building at the Schola Cantorum Basiliensis and at the Zurich University of the Arts. He gives concerts throughout Europe, lectures on organ building and has recorded various CDs. In addition, he was organist at the Kirche St. Josef in Dietikon until 2000.

Andreas Boesch, employee at the company since 2000, took over the technical project planning in 2005. From March 2019, he has been the managing director and owner of Orgelbau Edskes.

== Work ==
Edskes was known for his consistent restoration practice and reconstructions of Renaissance and Baroque organs, However, he restored 19th-century organs and realised independent new buildings. As for his brother, the Groningen organologist Cor Edskes, the work of Arp Schnitger forms the focus and conceptual orientation for quite a few of his new buildings. Characteristic of Edskes' historicising new organs is the completely uniform Intonation. He considers it pseudo-romantic to deliberately incorporate irregularities in order to make an organ appear older. Edskes also built stringed keyboard instruments such as harpsichords and clavichords.

== List of realisations (selection) ==
The size of the instruments is indicated in the fifth column by the number of manuals and the number of sounding stops in the sixth column. A capital "P" stands for an independent pedal, a small "p" for an attached pedal.

Year	Location	Church	Picture	Manual	Stops	Notes
1975	Willisau	Musikinstrumentensammlung		I	1	Restaurierung des Regals von Johannes Christophorus Pfleger (1644); 1991 von Edskes für Kloster Muri nachgebaut
1983	Zürich-Witikon	Maria Krönung		II/P	27	zusammen mit Armin Hauser; angelehnt an Arp Schnitger
1985	Basel	Predigerkirche		II/p	11	Neubau als Schwalbennestorgel in Zusammenarbeit mit Sebastian Blank; Pedal in der Tiefe mit eigenen Pfeifen
1988	Nieuw Scheemda (Oldambt)	Dorpskerk		I/p	8	Restaurierung des Positivs von Arp Schnitger (1695)
1988–1989	Regensburg	Minoritenkirche (Historisches Museum)		II/P	11	Rekonstruktion der Schwalbennestorgel (15./16. Jahrhundert) nach einem Dispositionsentwurf von Caspar Sturm (1583)
1992	Muri	Klosterkirche St. Martin		I	4	Nachbau der Chororgel von Karl Joseph Maria Bossart (1777/1778)
1992–1993	Reepsholt	St. Mauritius		II/p	17	Restoration of the organ by Johann Friedrich Wenthin (1788/89)
1993	Münzbach	Pfarrkirche		II/P	15	Restaurierung der Orgel von Franz Lorenz Richter (1764) in Zusammenarbeit mit Orgelbau Kögler → Orgel
1994	Basel	Waisenhaus-Kirche		II/P	22	Nachbau der Orgel von Arp Schnitger (1693–1694) im Hamburger Zustand → Orgel der Grasberger Kirche
1994	Steyr	Benediktinerstift Gleink		II/P	20	Neubau hinter historischem Gehäuse von 1732.
1995	Linz	Marienkapelle des Konservatoriums für Kirchenmusik		II/P	12	
1995	Clauen	Village church		I/p		Restaurierung der Orgel von Gottfried Fritzsche (1621/22), die 1725/26 durch Johann Andreas Graff eingreifend umgebaut wurde
1996	Hardegsen	St. Mauritius		II/P	30	Neubau unter Verwendung von Restteilen der Hauptwerkfront von Johann Justus Hansen (1784), die mehrfach umgebaut wurde; der Brustwerkschrank ist leer.
1997	Aurich	St.-Ludgerus-Kirche		II/P	15	Neubau; Unterwerk als Flötenwerk
1997	Neufelden	Pfarrkirche Neufelden		I/P	8	Rekonstruktion der Brüstungsorgel von Johann Ignaz Egedacher (1720–1730)
1997	Urbach	Friedenskirche		II/P	13	Neubau
1997	Gurten	Pfarrkirche		II/P	13	Neubau
1996–1998	Sack	St. Georg		I/p	12	Restoration of the organ by Johann Wilhelm Gloger (1726–1728), reconstruction of three stops; largely preserved
1999	Mittenwald	St. Peter und Paul		II/P	29	Neubau
1995–2000	Melle	St. Petri		III/P	37	Restaurierung der Orgel von Christian Vater (1722–1724) → Orgel
1986, 2000–2001	Uithuizen	Jacobikerk		II/P	28	Restaurierung der Orgel von Arp Schnitger (1700/01) auf den Zustand von 1785; 1986 Rückpositiv, 2000/01 Hauptwerk und Pedal → Orgel der Jacobikerk Uithuizen
2001	Mariana, Minas Gerais	Franziskanerkirche		II/p	19	Restaurierung der Orgel von Arp Schnitger (um 1712), Wiederherstellung des Zustands von 1753 (Aufstellung in Mariana) → Orgel der Kathedrale von Mariana
2002	Tokio	Klosterkirche Nazareth		II/P	12	Neubau
2003	Groningen	Hausorgel Jan Willem van Willigen		II/P	10	Neubau in Anlehnung an die Schnitger-Orgel in Uithuizen
2003–2004	Ommen	Het Baken		II/P	21	Neubau
2004–2005	Veenhuizen	Koepelkerk	zentriert	II/P	15	Restaurierung und Erweiterung der Orgel von Hillebrand (1821); das Rückpositiv in der Brüstung ist nur 25 cm tief und verfügt über 5 Register
2004–2006	Dordrecht	Julianakerk		II/P	32	Neubau unter Einbeziehung der Pedalregister aus der Vorgängerorgel
2007	Termen	Pfarrkirche		II/P	22	Neubau
2007–2008	Dübendorf	Maria Frieden		I/P	8	Restaurierung einer slowenischen Orgel von Franc Goršič (1886) in Besitz von Edskes, die in der Kirche Allerheiligen Zürich und Maria Frieden Dübendorf als Interimsorgel diente und heute in Dübendorf als Chororgel eingesetzt wird.
2008	Miyazaki	Lutherkirche		II/P	14	Neubau
2009	Groningen	„Stichting Groningen Orgelland“		I		Orgelfunktionsmodell
2009	Zürich-Neuaffoltern	Allerheiligen		II/P	27	Neubau
2010–2011	Aagtekerke	Gereformeerde Gemeente		II/P	22	Neubau
2011	Stift Ranshofen	Former collegiate church		II/P	26	behind historical casing
2012	Mittenwald	St. Peter und Paul		I	4^{1}/_{2}	New construction of a choir organ
2012–2013	Groningen	Het Zwitserse Huis, private Hausorgel		II/P	17	New building in the style of Schnitger
2014	Dübendorf	Maria Frieden		II/P	36	Two-piece case with free-standing console.
2015	Ouddorp	Eben-Haëzerkerk		IIIP	40	Conversion and rebuilding of the organ by Troels Krohn (1956) from the Helleruplund Kirke with Rückpositiv and Schwellwerk
2016	Neustadt an der Weinstraße	Stiftskirche		II/P	20	Neubau
2017	Groningen	Lutherse Kerk		II/P	24	Rekonstruktion der verlorenen Schnitger-Orgel von 1699 (II/p/16), die 1717 um ein selbstständiges Pedal erweitert wurde
2018	Gfenn (Dübendorf)	Lazariterkirche		II/P	12	im Gehäuse von Architekt Keller (1967); Temperierung nach Arnolt Schlick (1511)
2019–2020	Moerkapelle	Gereformeerde Gemeente		II/P	30	including 13 stops from the previous organ by Pieter Flaes (1890)
