= Friederich Stellwagen =

German organ builder (c.1603–1660)

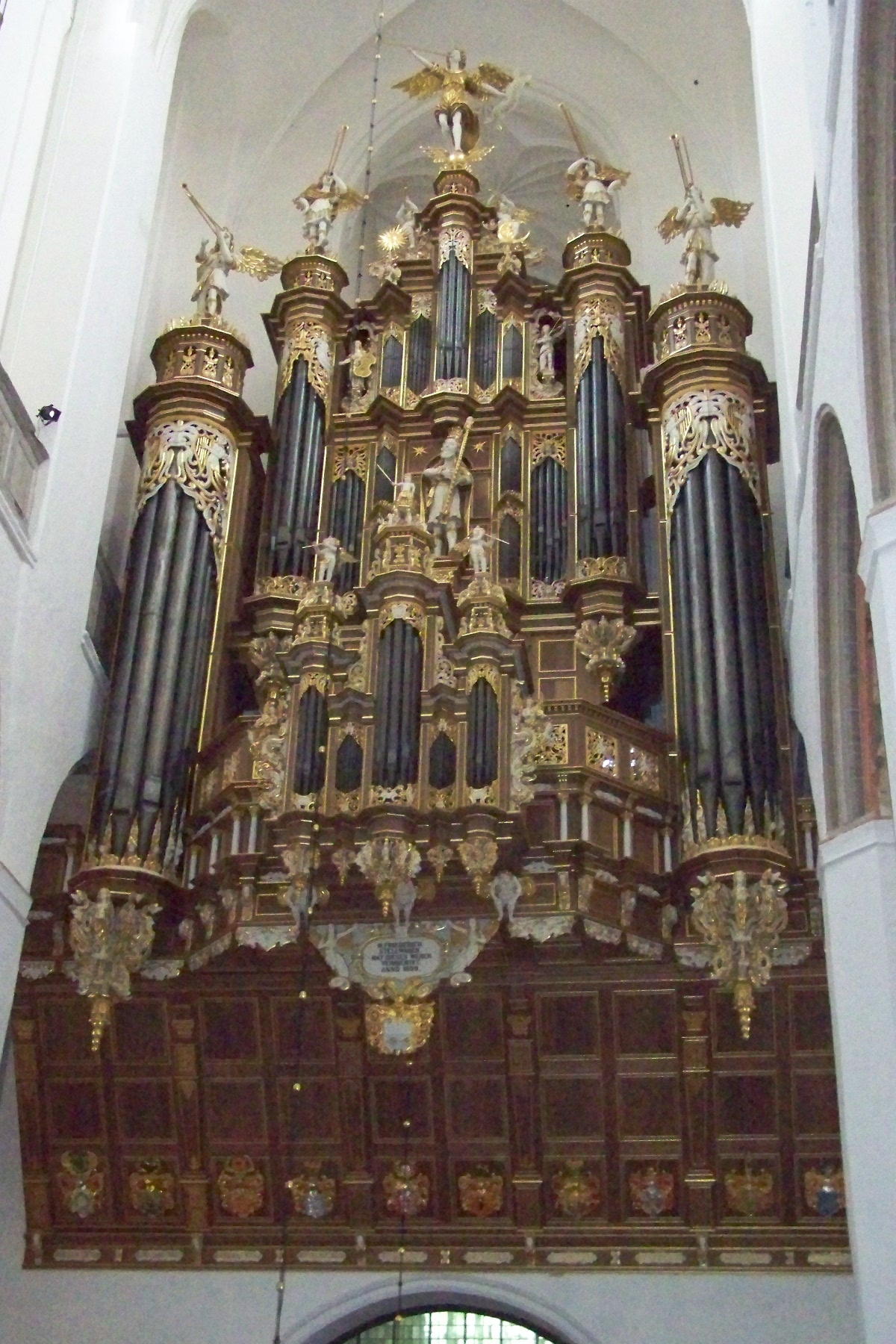
The Stellwagen organ in the Marienkirche in Stralsund

Friederich Stellwagen (baptized 7 February 1603 – buried 2 March 1660) was a pipe organ builder active in the region of northeast Germany between Hamburg and Stralsund in the mid 17th century. He learned with Gottfried Fritzsche and eventually married Fritzsche's daughter, Theodora. In 1634, Stellwagen was granted the privilege to build organs in Lübeck and after 1645 he was given full charge for maintenance of Lübeck's major organs.

Stellwagen is particularly noted for his work adding the Rückpositiv, Brustwerk and Pedal to the Gothic organ of ca. 1480 on the north wall of the Jacobikirche in Lübeck in 1636/37 and then building the new organ that has 24' Principal façade pipes for the giant brick-gothic Marienkirche in Stralsund that was completed in 1659. Both instruments are still extant and in good condition as examples from the best historic organ building in northern Europe.

Further information for Stellwagen, Fritzsche, the Jacobikirche in Lübeck and the Rückpositiv and Brustwerk of an organ is available in the German Wikipedia. An English description of the organ divisions is available here.
