= Gustav Fock =

German music historian and conductor (1893–1974)

Gustav Fock (18 November 1893 – 12 March 1974) was a German music historian, editor early music and organologist (musical instrumentologist). He is considered the most important Arp Schnitger researcher of his time.

== Life and work ==
Born in Neuenfelde, Fock was a captain's son from a family of seafarers in 1893. His father's name was Claus Hinrich Fock and he died early in 1913. His mother was Greta, née Fortriede, Tiedemann (died 1969). Claus Hinrich Fock was the owner and skipper of the two-masted ships called Cadet and later Greta.

His lifelong fascination for Arp Schnitger – who was also born in Neuenfelde – and his encounter with Schnitger's organ there awakened his lifelong fascination for this organ builder. He attended the Royal Music Institute of Berlin in Berlin Charlottenburg in 1919/20, then studied musicology with Max Seiffert at the Humboldt University of Berlin and with Fritz Stein in Kiel, where he was granted his doctorate in 1931 for the thesis Hamburgs Anteil am Orgelbau im niederdeutschen Kulturgebiet [Hamburg's part in organ building in Lower Germany]. Later he was Studienrat for music at Hamburg grammar schools until his retirement (1958). He lived in Hamburg Blankenese until his death in 1974 at the age of 80.

Musically, Fock was particularly influenced by his teacher Max Seiffert. The organ movement also exerted its influence on him. He wrote numerous music-historical treatises, especially on North German and Dutch organ culture. From 1942 to 1949 he investigated the music history of St. Michaelis, Lüneburg, but was unable to complete this work. Fock veranstaltete Orgelfahrten, um die historischen Orgeln einem breiten Publikum zu erschließen. He was particularly interested in the Schnitger organ (Hamburg).

In 1955 and 1960, Fock discovered two manuscripts of the Zellerfelder Tabulatur, One of the most important sources for the organ works of Jan Pieterszoon Sweelinck and his school. Of particular importance are the chorale arrangements and Magnificat settings by Heinrich Scheidemann, some of which were unknown until that time, and which he also published. His life's work is a monograph on "Arp Schnitger and his school", which only appeared posthumously in the year of his death. A publication of the manuscript, completed in 1940, had been delayed during the Second World War and lost due to bombing. Fortunately, Fock's meticulously compiled collection of material was preserved. Fock's treatise is the fundamental work on Arp Schnitger, his predecessors and successors, and all of Schnitger's organ buildings.

In addition to his publishing activities, Fock was a performing musician and was responsible as a conductor for several first performances, especially of Telemann cantatas, which he also published.

Fock's comprehensive musical estate archive integrates the scholarly estate of Max Seiffert. Since 1987, the largest part has been in the Staats- und Universitätsbibliothek Hamburg. The rest was located in Osterholz-Scharmbeck under the care of Harald Vogel and was to be systematically processed and digitised with the help of the University of the Arts Bremen. The collection was handed over to the Arp Schnitger Society in Golzwarden in 2011, which handed it over to the State Archives in Oldenburg.

== Publications ==
- Gustav Fock. "Dietrich Becker; Erasmus Bielfeldt; Erasmus Flor; Kaspar Förster sen.; Matthias Mercker; Peter Morhard; Johann Michael Röder; Heinrich Scheidemann; Hans Scherer d.J.; Arp Schnitger; Johann Steffens; Fried(e)rich Stellwagen; Zellerfelder Orgeltabulaturen". Die Musik in Geschichte und Gegenwart (1st ed.). Kassel: Bärenreiter.
- — (1939). "Hamburgs Anteil am Orgelbau im niederdeutschen Kulturgebiet". Zeitschrift des Vereins für Hamburgische Geschichte. No. 38. pp. 289–373.
- — (1950). Der junge Bach in Lüneburg. 1700 bis 1702. Hamburg: Merseburger.
- — (1950). Die Wahrheit über Bachs Aufenthalt in Lüneburg. Hansischer Gildenverlag: Hamburg.
- — (1958). "Die Hauptepochen des norddeutschen Orgelbaues bis Schnitger". Orgelbewegung und Historismus. Berlin: Walter Supper. pp. 36–48.
- — (1959). "Brahms und die Musikforschung". In Heinrich Husmann (ed.). Beiträge zur hamburgischen Musikgeschichte. Vol. 1. Hamburg: Musikwissenschaftliches Institut. pp. 46–69.
- Gustav Fock, ed. (1959). 900 Jahre Neuenfelde. Ausschuss für die Gestaltung der 900-Jahrfeier Hamburg-Neuenfelde (2 ed.). Hamburg-Neuenfelde: Lühmann.
- — (1961). "Zur Geschichte der Schnitgerorgel in St. Jakobi in Hamburg". Die Arp-Schnitger Orgel der Hauptkirche St. Jacobi, Hamburg. Hamburg: Kirchenvorstand der Hauptkirche St. Jacobi zu Hamburg.
- — (1962). "Zur Biographie des Bach-Schülers Johann Christian Kittel". Bach-Jahrbuch. Vol. 49. pp. 97–104. ISSN 0084-7682.
- — (1967). "Der historische Orgelbau im Küstengebiet zwischen Hamburg und Groningen (16.–18. Jahrhundert)". Acta Organologica. No. 1. pp. 11–21.
- — (1974). Arp Schnitger und seine Schule. Ein Beitrag zur Geschichte des Orgelbaues im Nord- und Ostseeküstengebiet. Kassel: Bärenreiter. ISBN 3-7618-0261-7.
- — (1995). Hamburg's Role in Northern European Organ Building. Easthampton, Massachusetts: Westfield Center. ISBN 0-9616755-3-5.
- —; Hans-Cord Sarnighausen (2004). Zur Musik und Glasmalerei in St. Michaelis Lüneburg. Husum: Verlag Husum. ISBN 3-89876-190-8.

as editor

- Johann Stephani: Studentengärtlein. Neue teutsche weltliche Madrigalia und Balletten. Möseler Verlag, Wolfenbüttel 1958.
- Georg Philipp Telemann: Ehre sei Gott in der Höhe. In festo nativitatis; Christmas cantata for soprano, alto, tenor, bass, four-part mixed choir, three trumpets, timpani, strings and basso continuo. Bärenreiter-Verlag, Kassel 1969.
- Georg Philipp Telemann: "Ruft es aus in alle Welt". Christmas cantata for soprano, alto, tenor, bass, four-part mixed choir, three trumpets, timpani, strings and basso continuo. Bärenreiter-Verlag, Kassel 1970.
- Georg Philipp Telemann: "Ew’ge Quelle, milder Strom". Cantata on the Sunday Cantate; for medium voice, flute (violin) and basso continuo. Bärenreiter-Verlag, Kassel 1971.
- Georg Philipp Telemann: "Gott will Mensch und sterblich werden". Cantata for the Feast of the Annunciation of Mary ... for high voice, violin and basso continuo. Bärenreiter-Verlag, Kassel 1971.
- Georg Philipp Telemann: "Jauchzt, ihr Christen, seid vergnügt". Cantata for the third Easter feast day for high voice, violin and basso continuo. Bärenreiter-Verlag, Kassel 1971.
- Georg Philipp Telemann: "Ihr Völker, hört". Cantata for the Feast of the Three Kings; for middle voice, flute and basso continuo. 9th ed. Bärenreiter-Verlag, Kassel 2005.
- Heinrich Scheidemann: Orgelwerke. 1. Choralbearbeitungen. 7th ed. Bärenreiter-Verlag, Kassel 2006.
- Heinrich Scheidemann: Orgelwerke. 2. Magnificat-Bearbeitungen. 3rd ed. Bärenreiter-Verlag, Kassel 2006.
- Georg Philipp Telemann: Der Harmonische Gottesdienst. 72 solo cantatas for 1 voice, 1 instrument and basso continuo, Hamburg 1725/26. 2nd ed. Bärenreiter-Verlag, Kassel 2007.
- Georg Philipp Telemann: Trauer-Kantate. 'Du aber, Daniel, gehe hin', for soprano, bass, four-part mixed choir, flute, oboe, violin, two violas da gamba and basso continuo. 8th ed. Bärenreiter-Verlag, Kassel 2008.
