= Zimbelstern =

Organ stop consisting of bells mounted on a wooden wheel or star

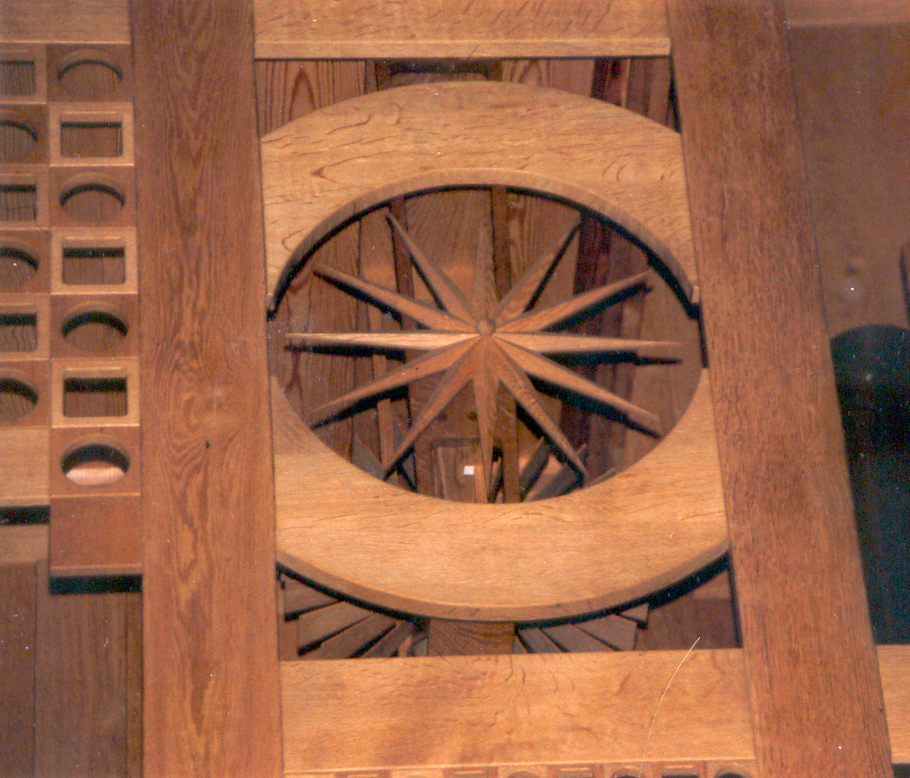
Zimbelstern

The Zimbelstern (meaning "cymbal star" in German, and also spelled Cymbelstern, Zymbelstern, or Cimbalstern) is a "toy" organ stop consisting of a metal or wooden star or wheel on which several small bells are mounted. When engaged, the star rotates, producing a continuous tinkling sound. It was common in northern Europe, Germany in particular, throughout the 16th, 17th, and 18th centuries. After about 1700, the bells were tuned to particular notes.

The device is probably most effective as a foil to light Baroque counterpoint of an upbeat nature, or hymns registered using a bright principal chorus. In some Christian liturgical traditions, it is rung during the singing of the Sanctus or on doxological stanzas of hymns.
