= Stadskanaal–Zuidbroek railway =

Railway line in the Netherlands

Stadskanaal-Zuidbroek railway
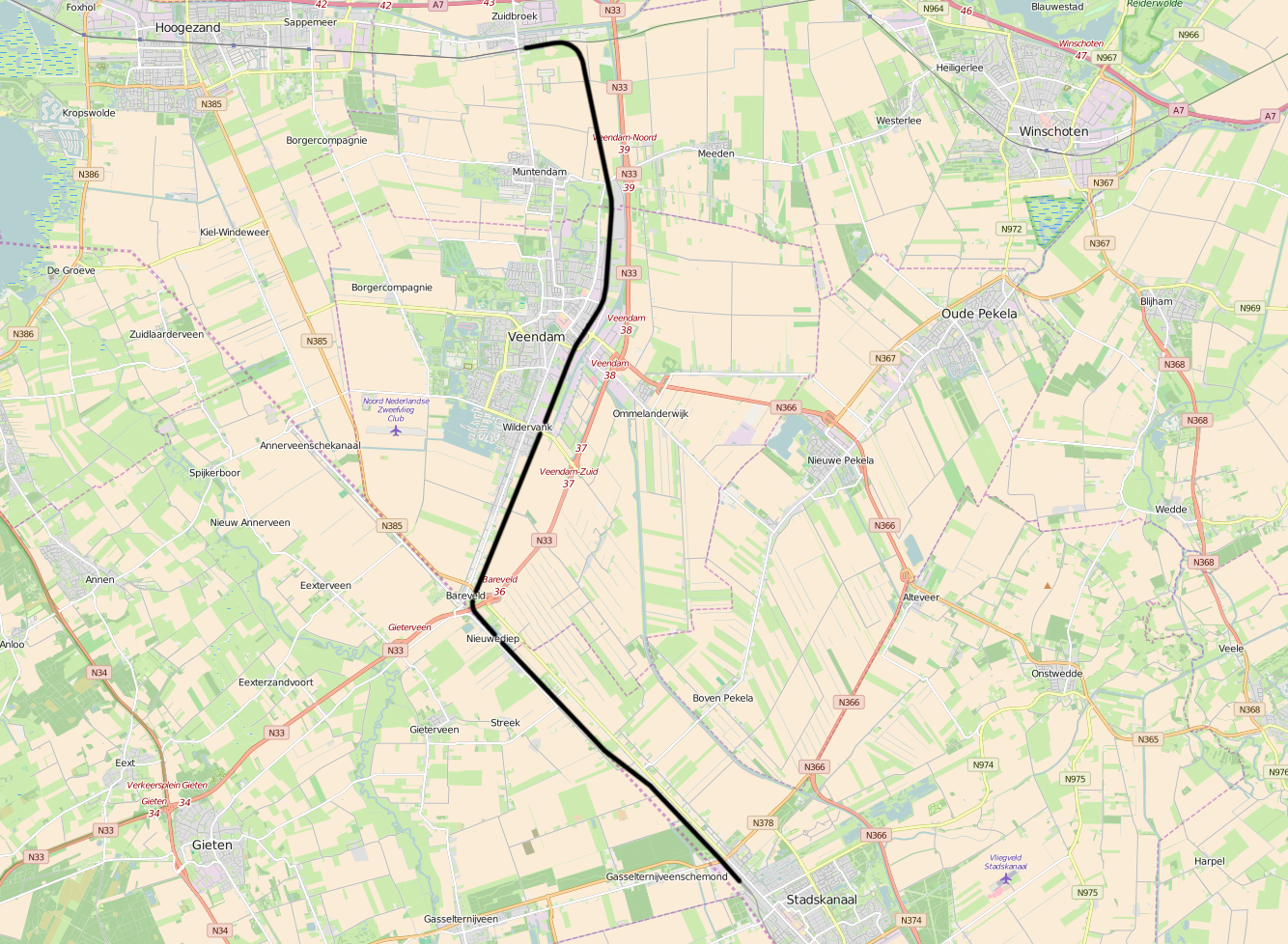

Overview
- Status: Operational
- Owner: ProRail, STAR
- Locale: The Netherlands
- Termini: Stadskanaal; Zuidbroek
- Stations: 6

Service
- Operator(s): Arriva, STAR

History
- Opened: August 1, 1910

Technical
- Line length: 22 km (14 mi)
- Number of tracks: single track
- Track gauge: 1,435 mm (4 ft 8 1/2 in) standard gauge
- Electrification: no

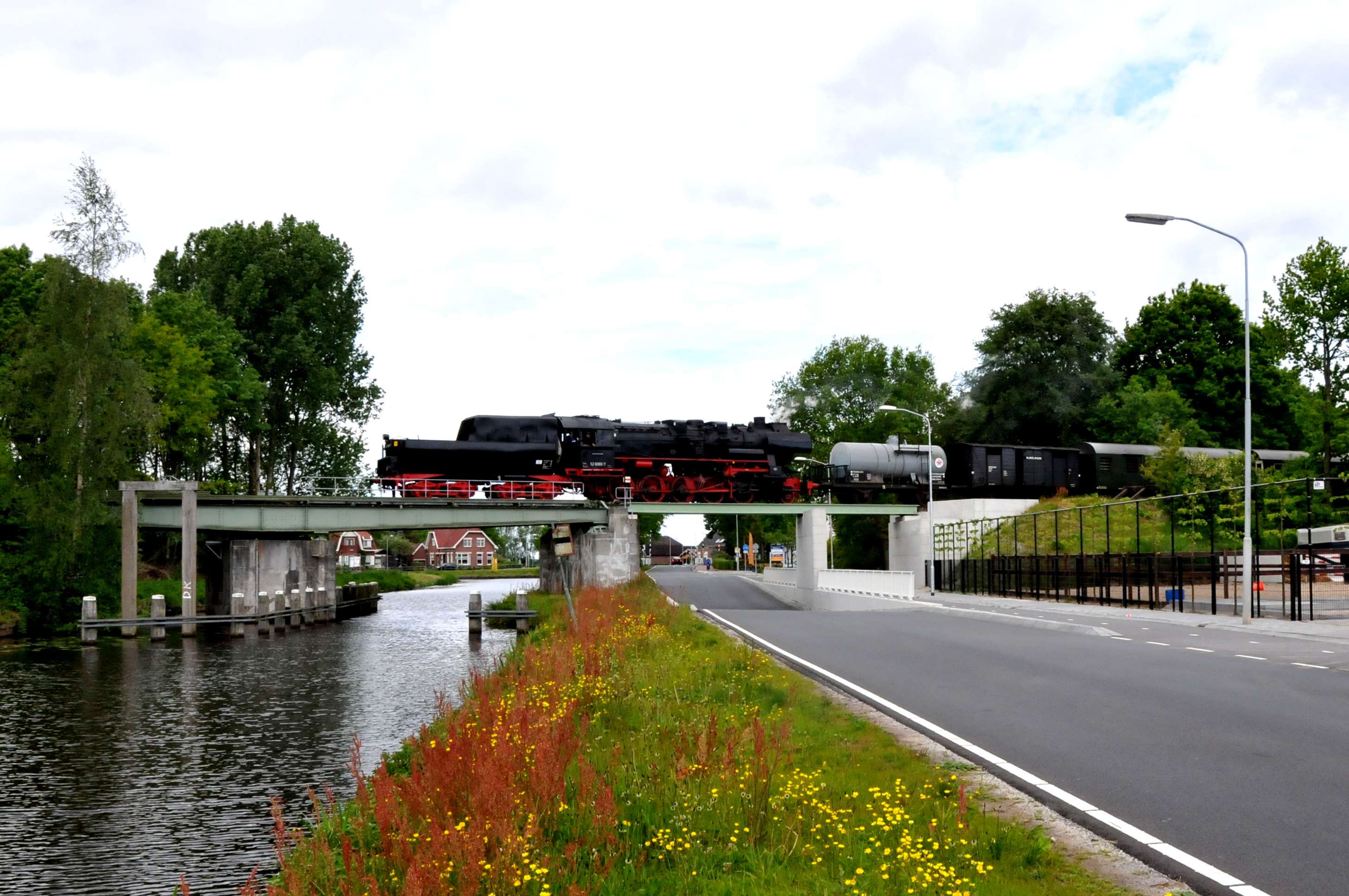
Steam train on the Stadskanaal-Zuidbroek railway in Wildervank in 2015

The Stadskanaal–Zuidbroek railway is a railway line in the Netherlands, running from Stadskanaal to Zuidbroek, passing through Veendam. The line was opened in 1910, and closed in 1953, but the Veendam-Zuidbroek section was reopened in 2011. The Stadskanaal-Veendam section is owned by the STAR museum railway, and mostly runs using steam trains.

== Stations ==
Station	Opened	Closed	Notes
Stadskanaal Hoofdstation	1905	1953	
Stadskanaal Pekelderweg	1910	1953	
Nieuwediep	1910	1953	
Bareveld	1910	1953	
Wildervank	1910	1953	
Veendam	1910; 2011	1953 —	two separate stations: one served by Arriva, the other by STAR steam trains
Meeden-Muntendam	1910	1941	
Zuidbroek	1868	—	

== Train service ==
Services on the Veendam-Zuidbroek line are operated by Arriva. From Monday to Saturday, trains run every thirty minutes between 5am and 8pm. At all other times trains run hourly.
