= Noordbroek =

- Village
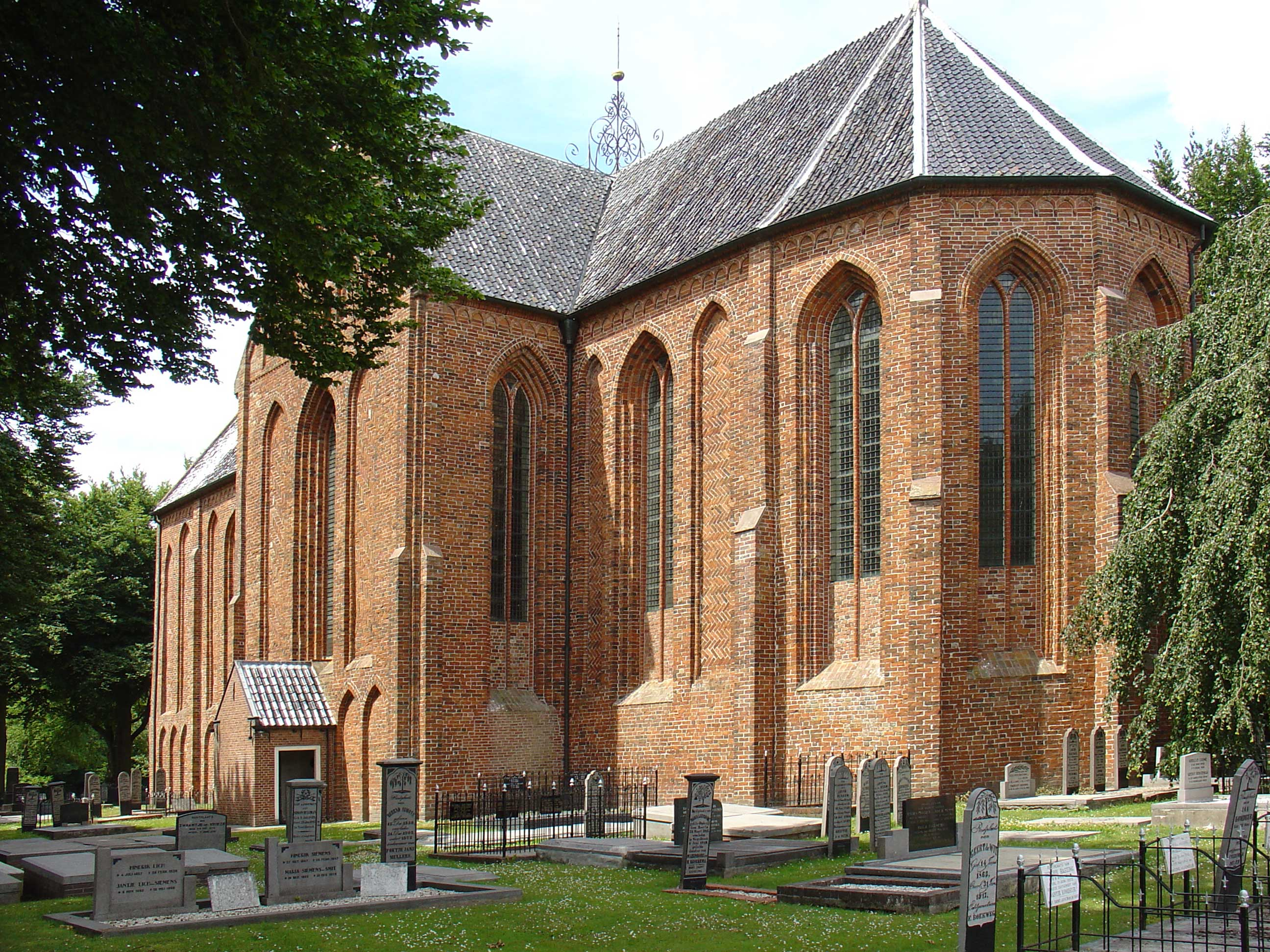
- Church of Noordbroek in 2008

- Location in the province of Groningen in the Netherlands Noordbroek (Netherlands)
- Coordinates: 53°11′36″N 6°52′27″E
- Country: Netherlands
- Province: Groningen
- Municipality: Midden-Groningen

Area
  - Total: 25.70 km^{2} (9.92 sq mi)
- Elevation: 1.4 m (4.6 ft)

Population (2021)
  - Total: 1,880
  - Density: 73.2/km^{2} (189/sq mi)
- Time zone: UTC+1 (CET)
  - Summer (DST): UTC+2 (CEST)
- Postal code: 9635
- Dialing code: 0597

Noordbroek (Gronings: Noordbrouk) is a village in the Dutch province of Groningen. It is located in the municipality of Midden-Groningen, about 8 km northeast of Hoogezand.

Noordbroek was a separate municipality until 1965, when it became part of Oosterbroek.

== History ==
The village was first mentioned in 1273 as "in Broke", and means north swampy forest. Noord (north) has been added to distinguish between Zuidbroek. Noordbroek is a road village which developed in the Late Middle Ages on a sandy ridge at the border with Oldambt.

The Dutch Reformed church dates from the 14th century and has a detached tower. It was restored between 1968 and 1972, and the modifications of 1840 were undone. The former town hall was built in 1880 in neoclassic style. The grist mill De Noordstar was built in 1849, but is no longer in service.

Noordbroek was home to 1,521 people in 1840. It was an independent municipality until 30 June 1965 when it was merged into Oosterbroek. Since 2018, it is part of the municipality of Midden-Groningen.

== Gallery ==
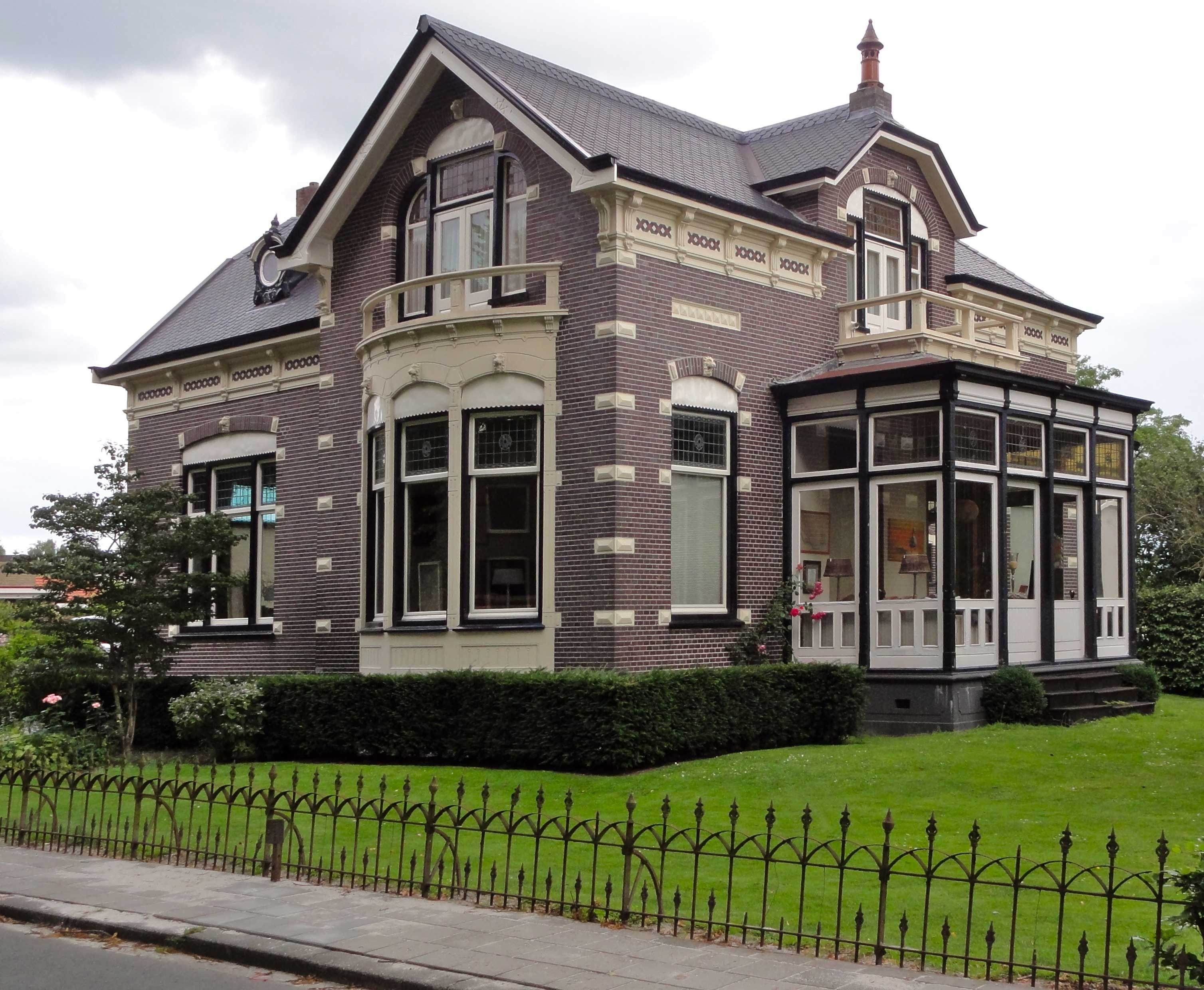
Villa is Noordbroek

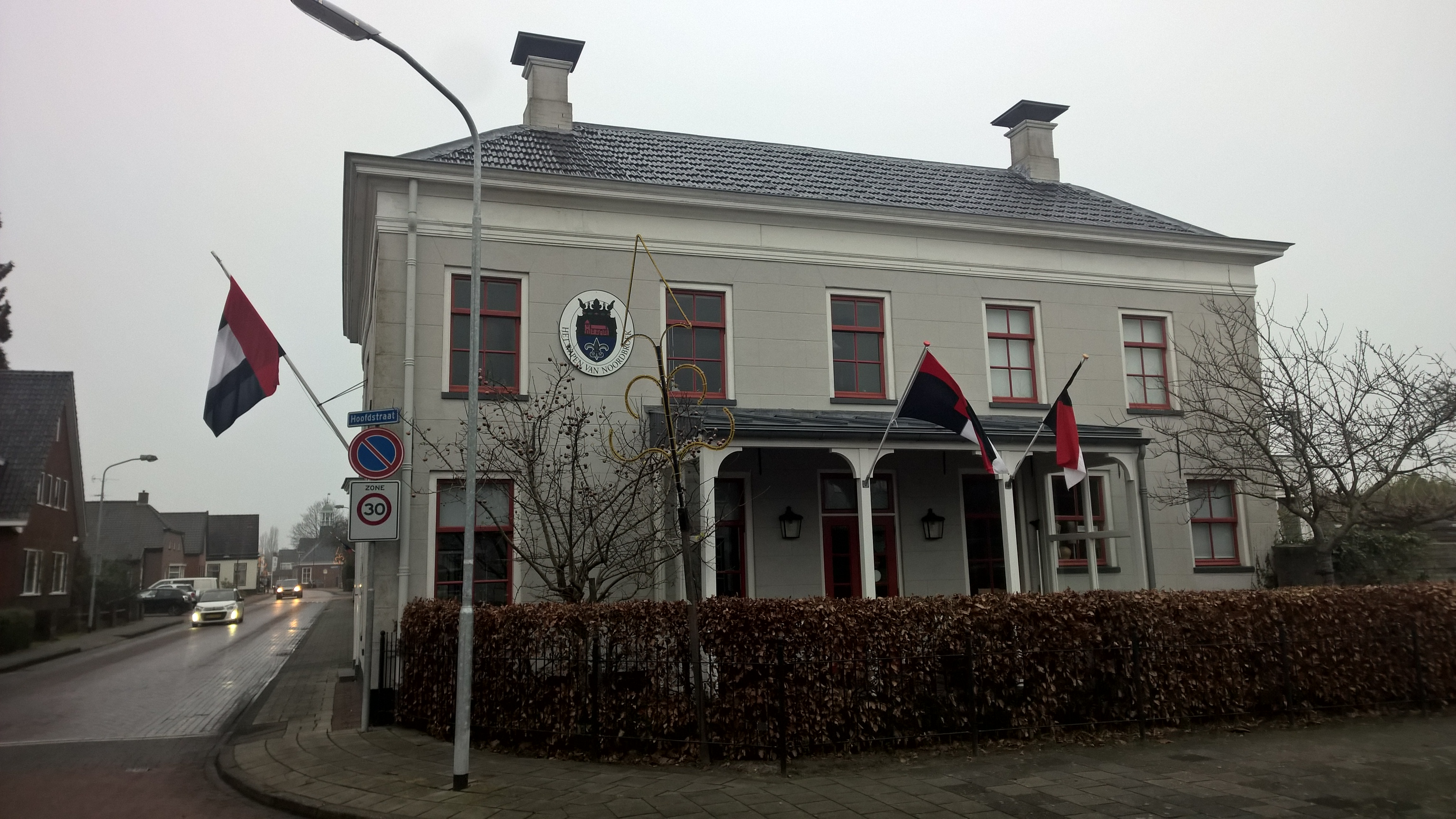
Former town hall. Nowadays Hotel Wapen van Noordbroek

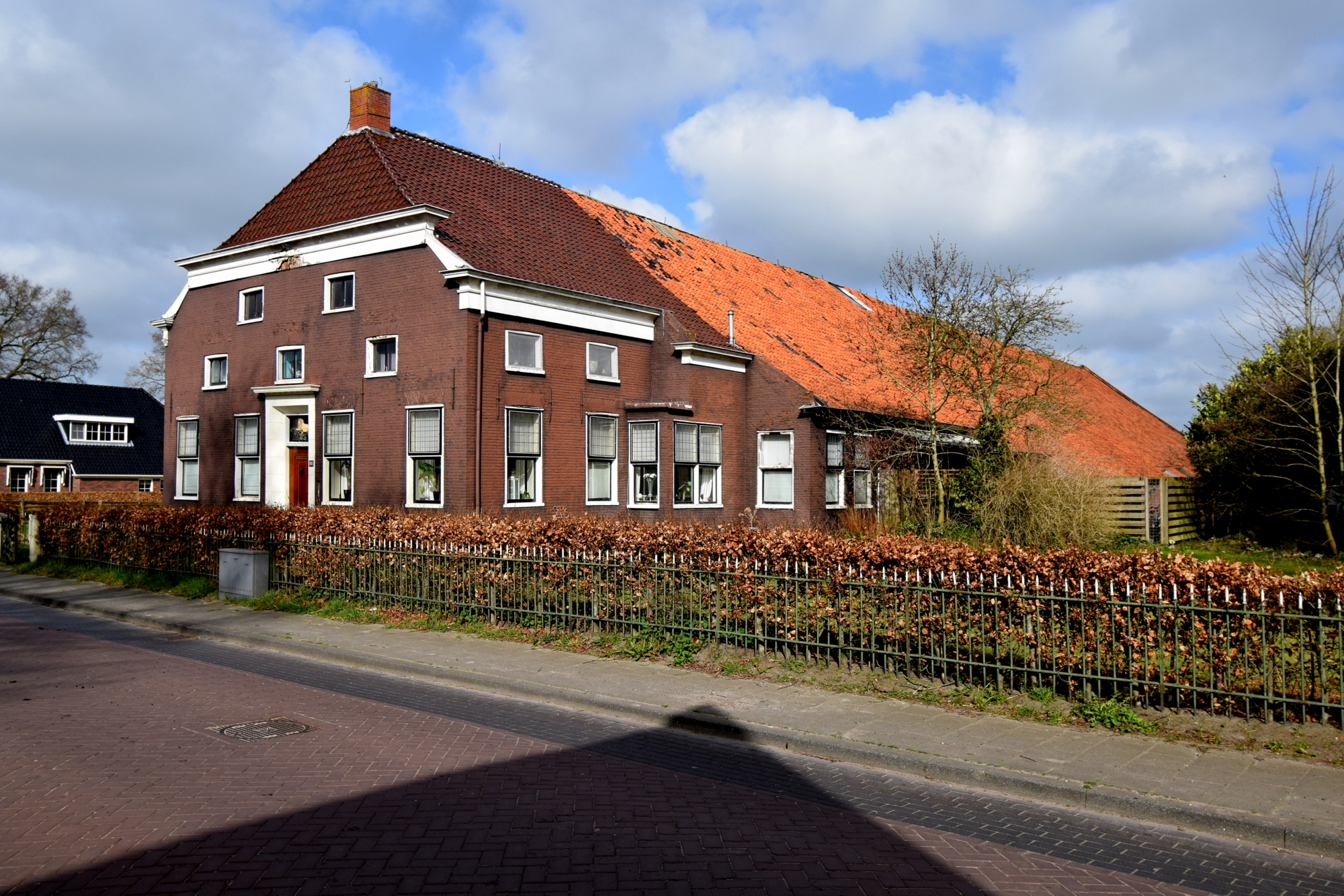
Farm in Noordbroek

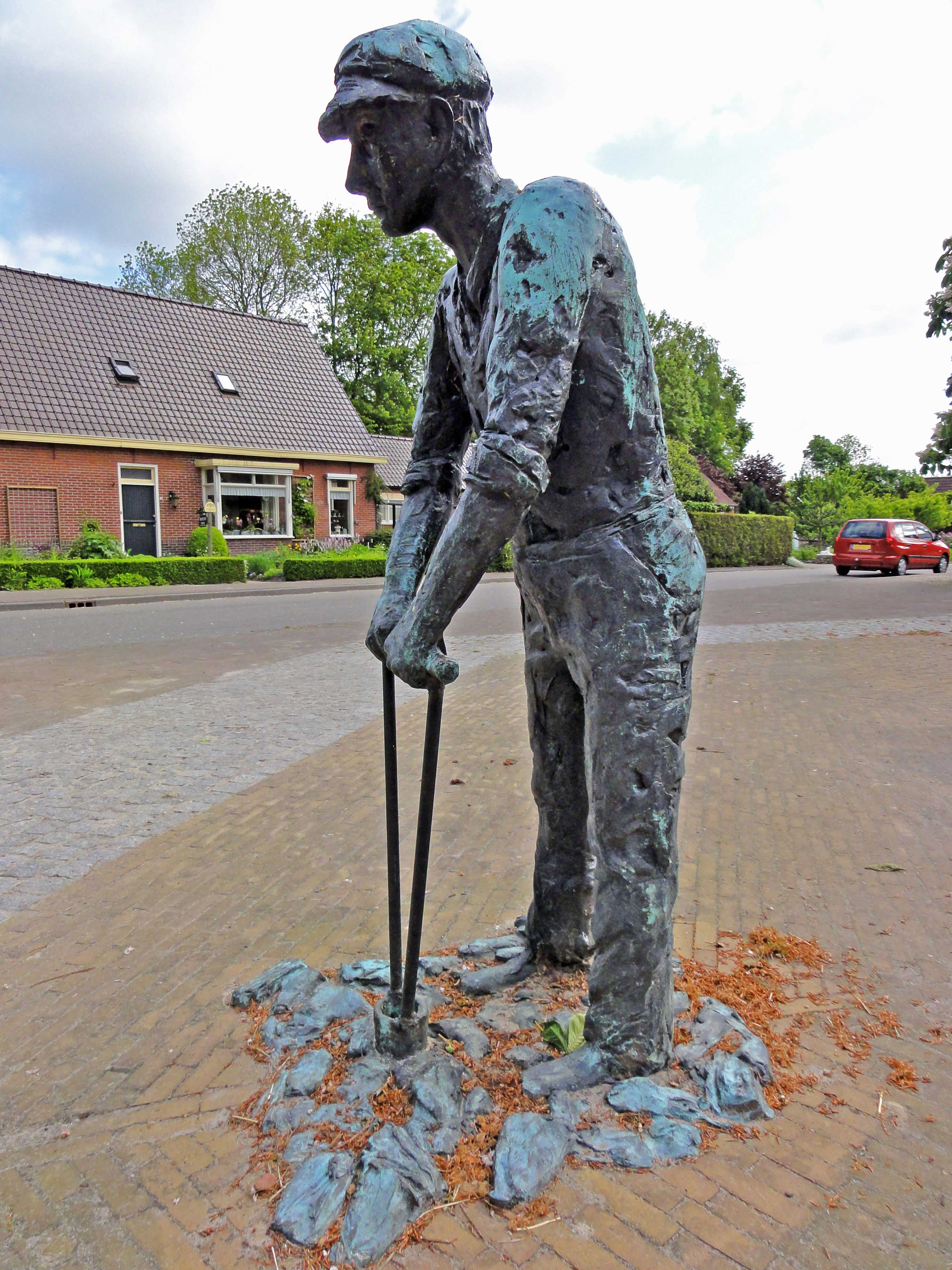
Farmers statue by Judith Braun
