= Meeden-Muntendam railway station =

Railway station in Muntendam, the Netherlands

Meeden-Muntendam
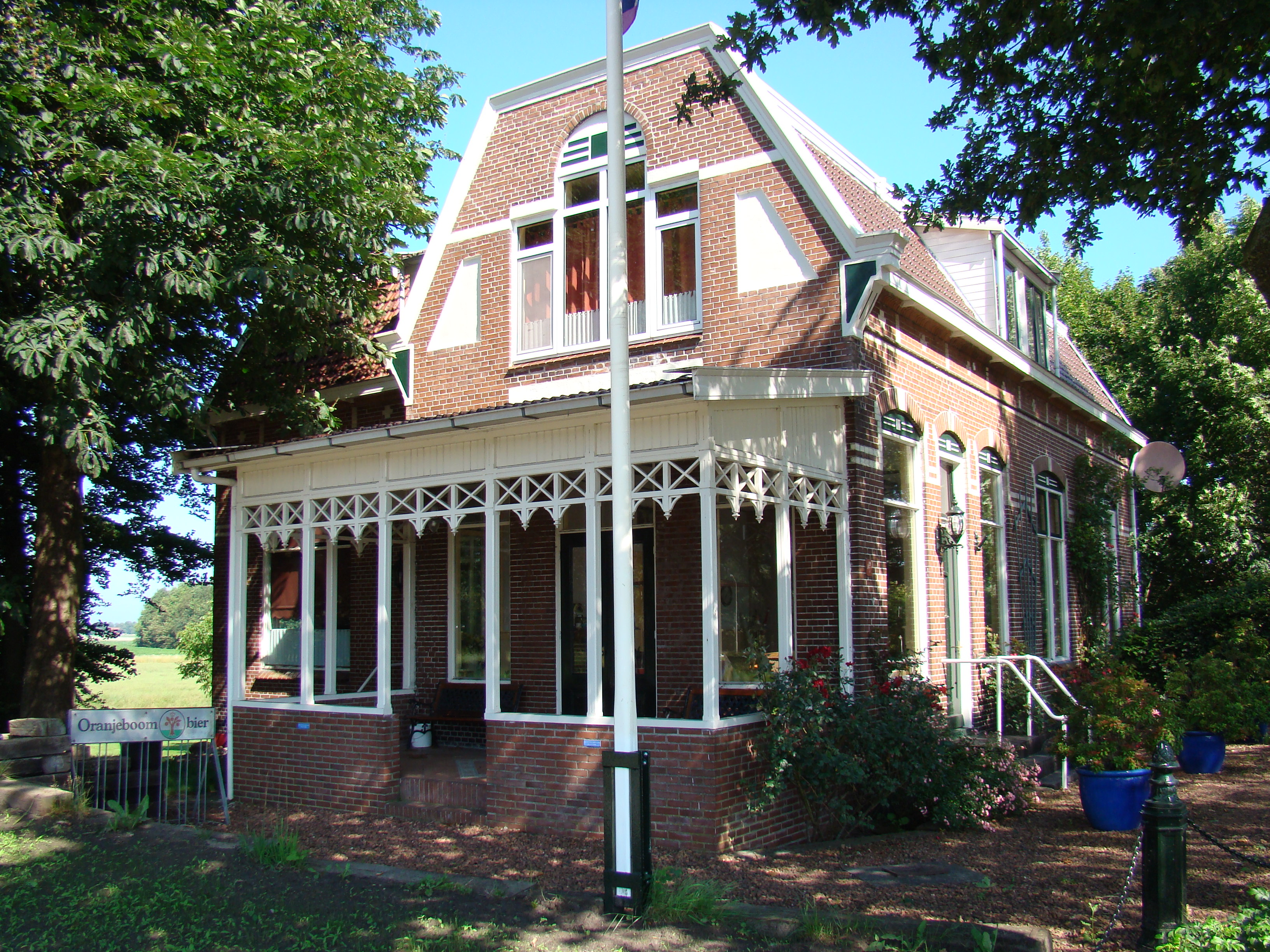

General information
- Location: Netherlands
- Coordinates: 53°08′03″N 6°53′31″E
- Line: Stadskanaal–Zuidbroek railway

Other information
- Station code: Mmd

History
- Opened: 1 August 1910
- Closed: 1 May 1941
Location
- Location within Netherlands

Meeden-Muntendam (Dutch pronunciation: [ˌmeːdə mʏntə(n)ˈdɑm]; abbreviation: Mmd) is a former railway station between Meeden and Muntendam in the Netherlands.

== History ==
The former station lies on the Stadskanaal–Zuidbroek railway between Zuidbroek and Veendam.

The station was originally open between 1 August 1910 and 1 May 1941.

== Bus service ==
Bus services 213 and 613 stop here.
