= Adriaan Geerts Wildervanck =

Dutch businessman

- Born: Adriaan Geerts; 4 September 1605; Groningen, Groningen, Netherlands
- Died: 24 November 1661 (aged 56); Wildervank, Groningen, Netherlands
- Occupations: Businessman, coloniser

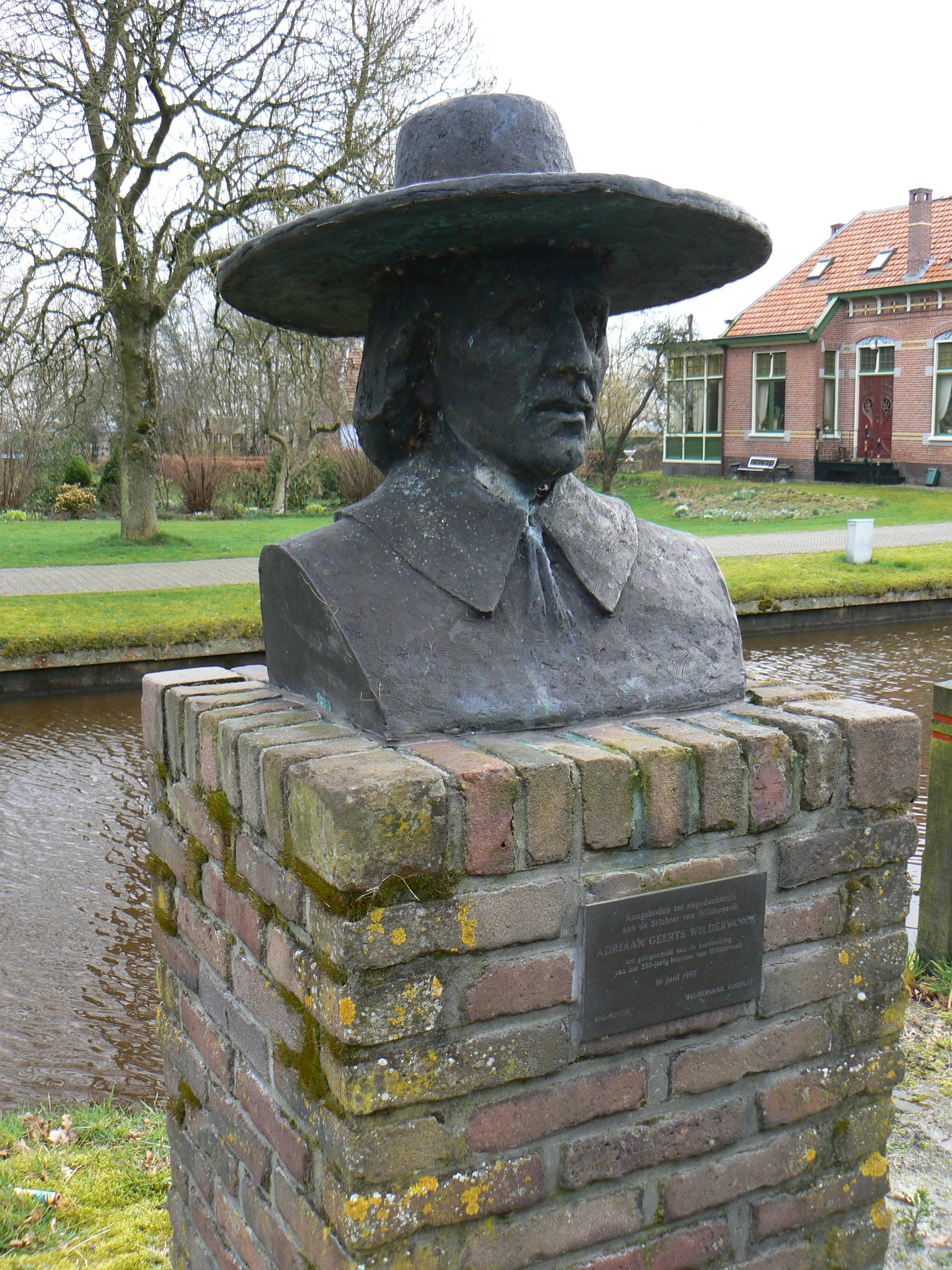
1997 Bust of Wildervanck in Wildervank

Adriaan Geerts Wildervanck (4 September 1605 – 24 November 1661) was a Dutch businessman and coloniser. In 1643, he lost most of his money when De Oevelgunne stranded on the Boschplaat with expensive lace. In 1647, he founded the Muntendammer Company to exploit a peat colony. As part of the colony, the villages of Wildervank (1647) and Veendam (1648) were established.

== Biography ==
Adriaan Geerts was born on 4 September 1605 in Groningen, Netherlands. He had been active in Groningen as an accountant, and tenant of the council and winery of Groningen. (Note: In 1445, a winery was built next to the council of the city of Groningen, and was used as a public meeting place.)

In 1643, the ship De Oevelgunne was on route from England to Hamburg with expensive lace, but stranded on the Boschplaat in the Wadden Sea. The salvagers wanted their customary 1/3 share of the merchandise, however Geerts refused, because the ship had not been abandoned. A lengthy trial followed which attracted the attention of both the British government and the States General of the Netherlands. In 1645, Geerts lost on appeal, and was ordered to pay the salvagers and a large fine.

Geerts moved to Oude Pekela to study the exploitation of peat by the city of Groningen. The Wildervankster bog was a raised bog which was still untouched. On 6 June 1647, he established the Muntendammer Company to exploit the bog. The exploration was very costly, and Geerts needed to take out a mortgage of ƒ250,000 from an Amsterdam merchant. In 1647, the village of Wildervank was founded, and Geerts would start to use the surname Wildervanck. In 1648, the village of Veendam was established.

The Muntendammer Company was a moderately successful company. About twelve years later, Wildervanck tried to expand his operation into neighbouring Drenthe, but was taken prisoner by angry peasants and briefly imprisoned in the tower of Rolde. The heavy mortgage payments forced Wildervanck to sell large parts of the colony. In 1659, construction started of a church in Wildervank which was named Margaretha Hardenberg Church after his wife.

Wildervanck died on 24 November 1661 in Wildervank, at the age of 56, and was buried in the Margaretha Hardenberg Church.

== Legacy ==
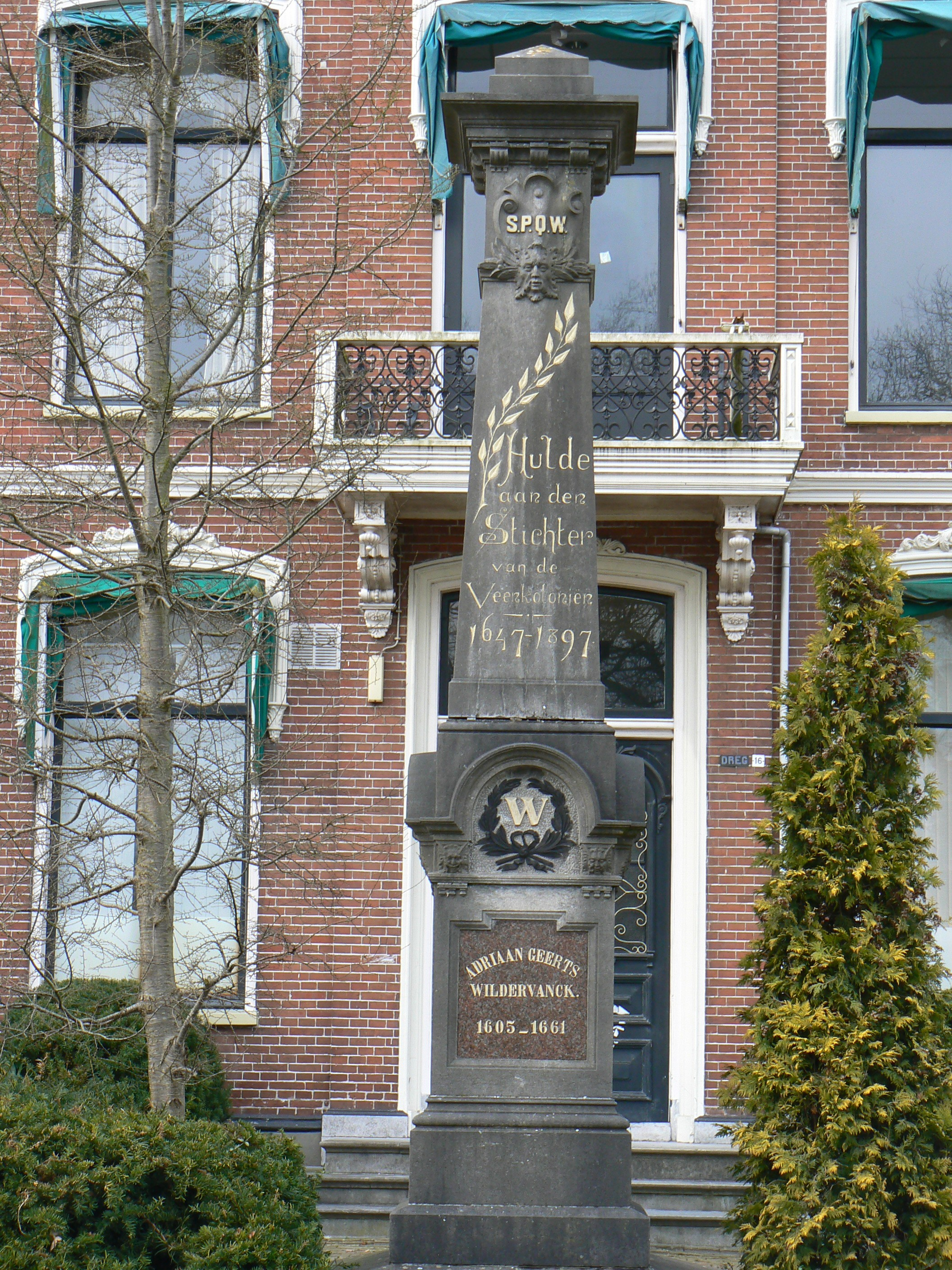
1897 Monument. SPQW (Senatus Populusque Wildervankus)

In 1897, a monument dedicated to Wildervanck was revealed in Wildervank in front of the town hall as the founder of the village.

In 1965, the canal between Wildervank and Zuidbroek was named A.G. Wildervanck Canal.

In 1997, a bust by Bert Kiewiet was revealed in Wildervank.
