= Westerdiepsterdallen =

- Hamlet
- Location of Westerdiepsterdallen in the province of Groningen Westerdiepsterdallen (Netherlands)
- Coordinates: 53°4′45″N 6°49′7″E
- Country: Netherlands
- Province: Groningen
- Municipality: Veendam

Population (2007)
  - Total: 5

Westerdiepsterdallen is a hamlet, near Groningen. For a long time, it only had 1 inhabitant, when one of the houses was empty. By only having 1 inhabitant, it made it to the 1984 Guinness Book of Records. The hamlet has grown to 5 people.

== History ==
Westerdiepsterdallen was an agricultural community. It used to have three houses, but one burned down in 1956. The fire department had difficulty finding the village, and arrived late. In 1975, one of the farms was squatted by Bonney Brattinga. After three years, he decided to buy the farm. The municipality tried to condemn the village, however Brattinga successfully protested the decision, and remained on his farm even though he had no gas or electricity, and used a water tank. In 1984, Westerdiepsterdallen made the Guinness Book of Records.

The population has grown to five people, and nowadays has the same population as Breezanddijk. Westerdiepsterdallen is not a statistical unit, and is considered part of Wildervank. Breezanddijk is a statistical unit with its own postal code.
