= Veendam (ship) =

Several ships have been named Veendam, after the town of Veendam in the province of Groningen in the Netherlands. They include:

- SS Baltic (1871), renamed Veendam in 1888 and sunk by a collision in 1898
- SS Veendam (1922), completed in 1923 and scrapped in 1953
- SS Argentina (1958), renamed Veendam in 1975 and scrapped in 2003
- MS Veendam, launched in 1995 and renamed Aegean Majesty in 2020
