= Veendam =

- Town and Municipality
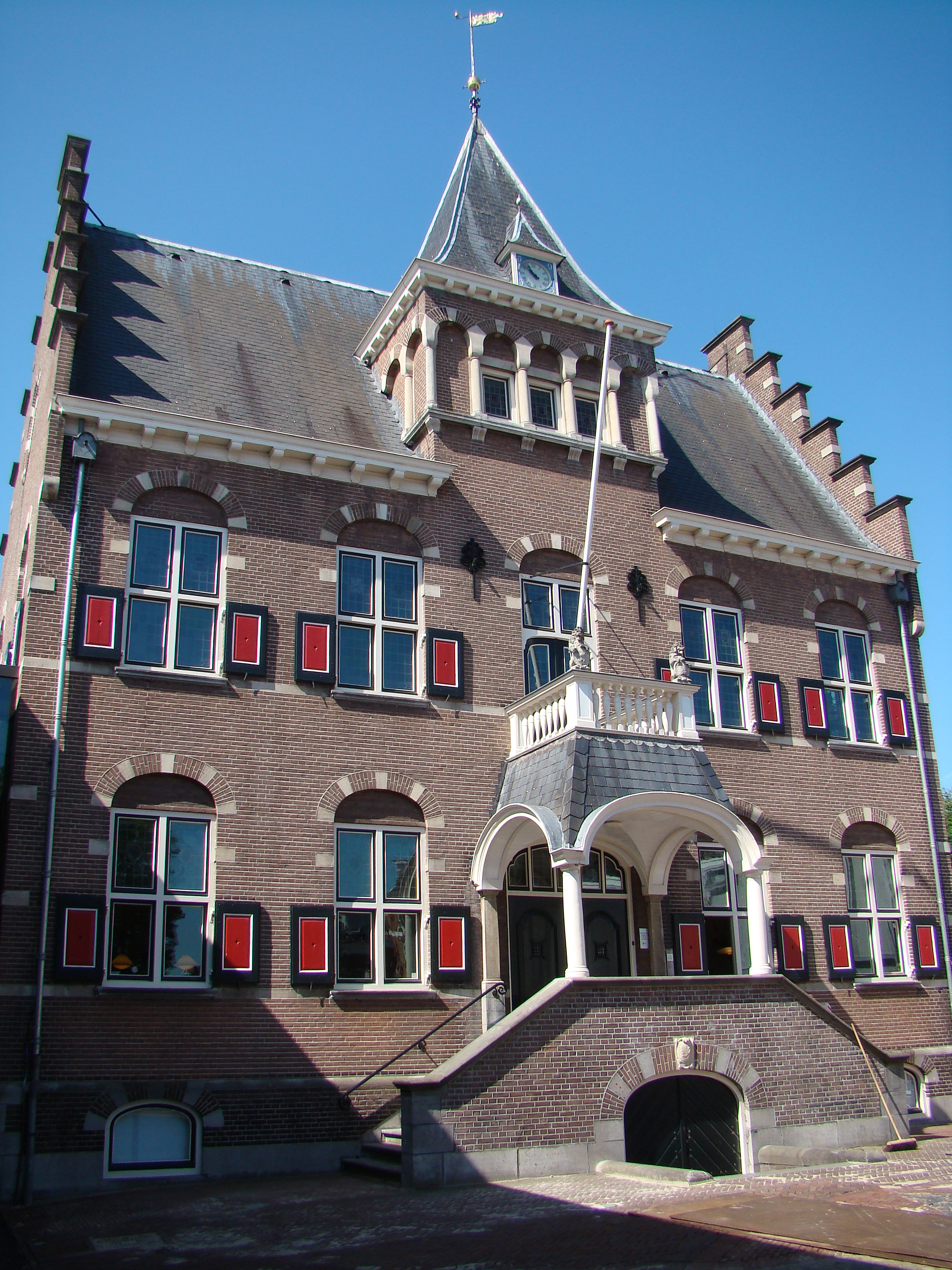
- Town hall of Veendam

- Flag Coat of arms

- Location in Groningen
- Coordinates: 53°6′N 6°53′E
- Country: Netherlands
- Province: Groningen
- Established: 1648

Government
  - Body: Municipal council
  - Mayor: Berry Link (CDA)

Area
  - Total: 78.68 km^{2} (30.38 sq mi)
  - Land: 76.00 km^{2} (29.34 sq mi)
  - Water: 2.68 km^{2} (1.03 sq mi)
- Elevation: 2 m (6.6 ft)

Population (January 2021)
  - Total: 27,417
  - Density: 361/km^{2} (930/sq mi)
- Demonym: Veendammer
- Time zone: UTC+1 (CET)
  - Summer (DST): UTC+2 (CEST)
- Postcode: 9630–9633, 9640–9648
- Area code: 0598
- Website: www.veendam.nl

Veendam (Dutch pronunciation: [veːnˈdɑm]) is a town and municipality with a population of 27,752 in the province of Groningen in the northeast of the Netherlands. Veendam is also known as Parkstad (Park City). It is located on the N33 national highway which runs from Eemshaven to Assen.

Veendam was established in 1648 as a peat colony by Adriaan Geerts Wildervanck. The ribbon development so characteristic of this region has been adapted in Veendam. In the center of the town, the two canals, the Oosterdiep and the Westerdiep, formed a fork because the Munte River originally flowed here.

Holland America Line has named four ships Veendam after the town.

== History ==
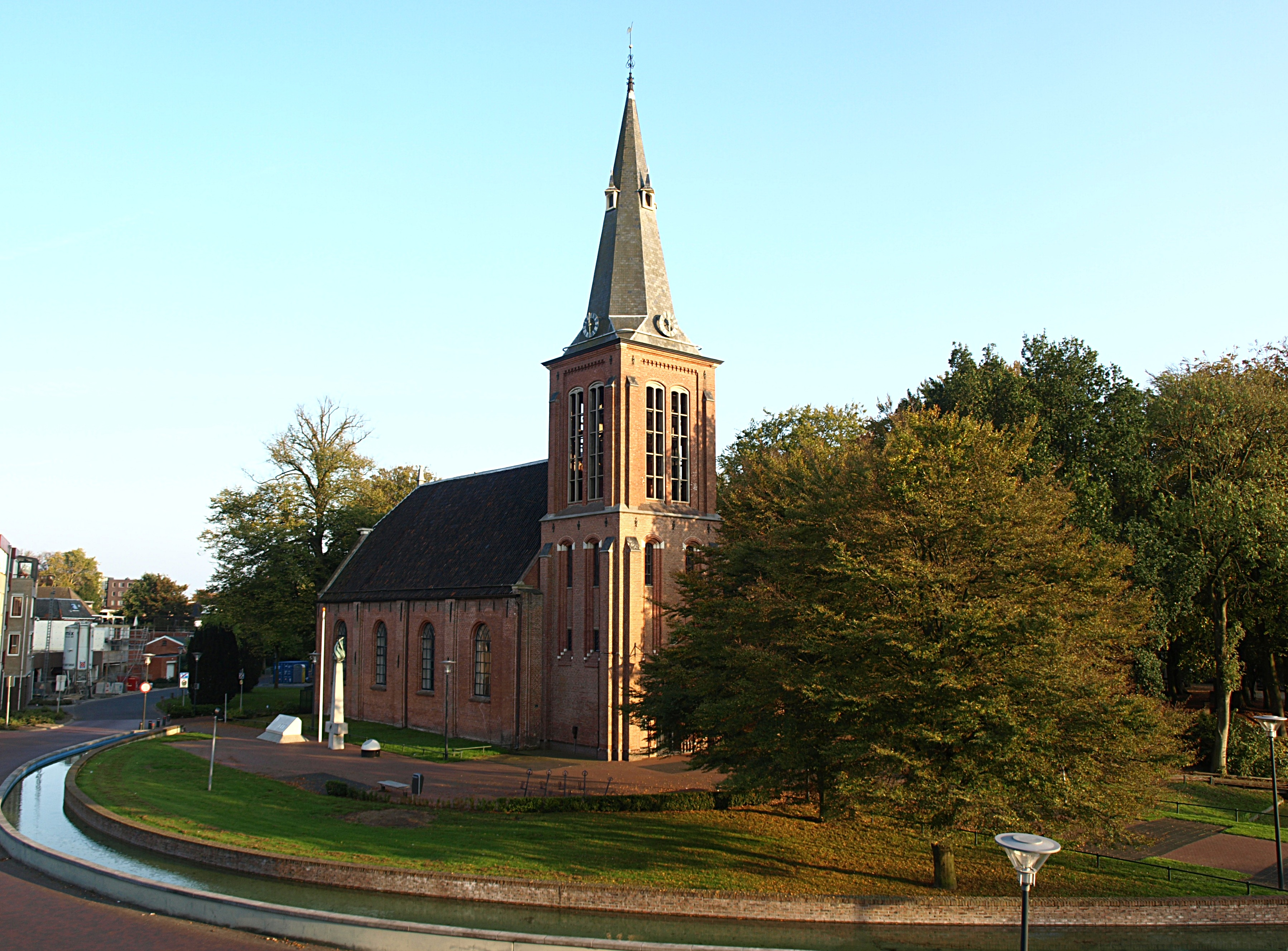
Church in Veendam

In 1655, the parish under Muntendam was separated from Zuidbroek and Muntendam. The new parish was called 'Veendam ende Wildervanck'. The foundation stone for the first church was laid in 1660 by Adriaan Geerts Wildervanck (1605-1661). In 1662, the Grote Kerk (Great Church) was inaugurated. In 1687, the church in Wildervank was also completed. Until 1702, both churches functioned under a single church council, but in that year the Wildervank parish became independent and received its own coat of arms. Veendam retained the coat of arms that had been assigned to the parish in 1657. The municipality of Wildervank was dissolved on 1 January 1969 and split into Veendam and Stadskanaal.

=== Peat colonies and building structure ===
Veendam has always held a special place in the Groningen peat colonies region. It retains a typical peat colony ribbon structure, except near the center. This structure was caused by the presence of the Oude AE river, which forced the parallel Oosterdiep and Westerdiep canals to diverge northward. This gave Veendam its forked structure, allowing the basin to form between them. The center is characterized by spaciousness, greenery, and water features (Parkstad Veendam).

=== Coastal shipping and agricultural industry ===
Over time, the original peat trade developed into such an important coastal trade that Lloyds Register established its first offices on mainland Europe in 1868, in Amsterdam, Rotterdam, and Veendam. Besides shipping, agriculture played a significant role in the 19th century. After peat extraction, the land was used for agriculture. This agriculture gave rise to a significant agricultural industry: the potato starch and derivatives industry. Today's Royal Avebe is derived from this industry. In the second half of the 19th century, shipping and shipbuilding lost so much of their importance that they shifted to industries such as metalworking.

=== Industrial municipality ===
The municipality of Veendam is an industrial municipality, with a significant portion of its industry focused on agricultural processing. Numerous companies have developed into international corporations around this theme. For example, thousands of containers are transhipped annually in Veendam at one of the largest inland container terminals in the Netherlands.

=== Later ===
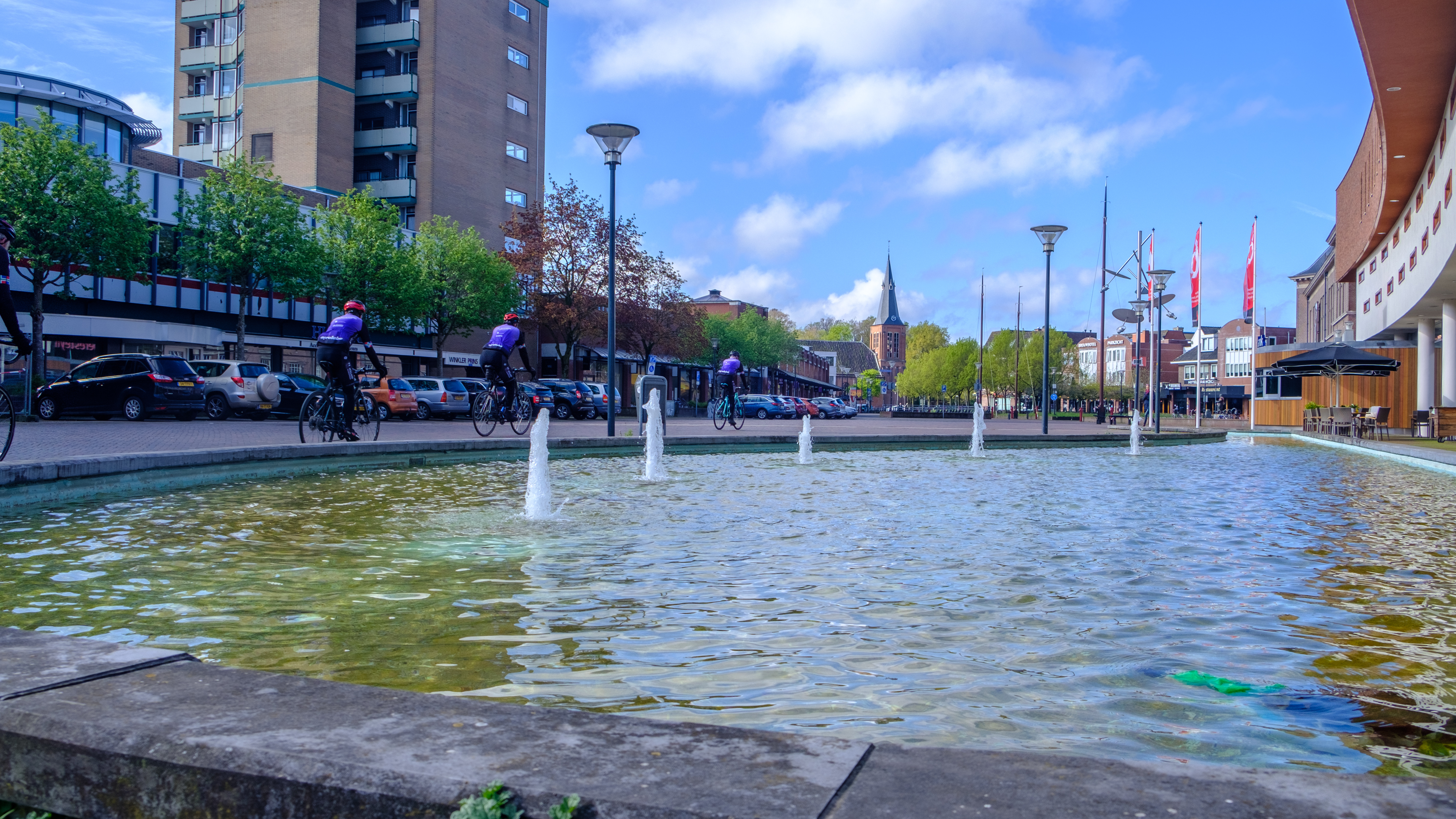
The Museumplein in Veendam constructed in 2004

Thanks to peat extraction, Veendam and Wildervank had a very diverse population. There was also a relatively large Jewish community. During World War II, only a few survived the Holocaust. With the arrival of guest workers in the agricultural and textile industries, a Turkish community emerged in Veendam. Over the course of the 20th century, Veendam's population grew to over 20,000.

== Geography ==
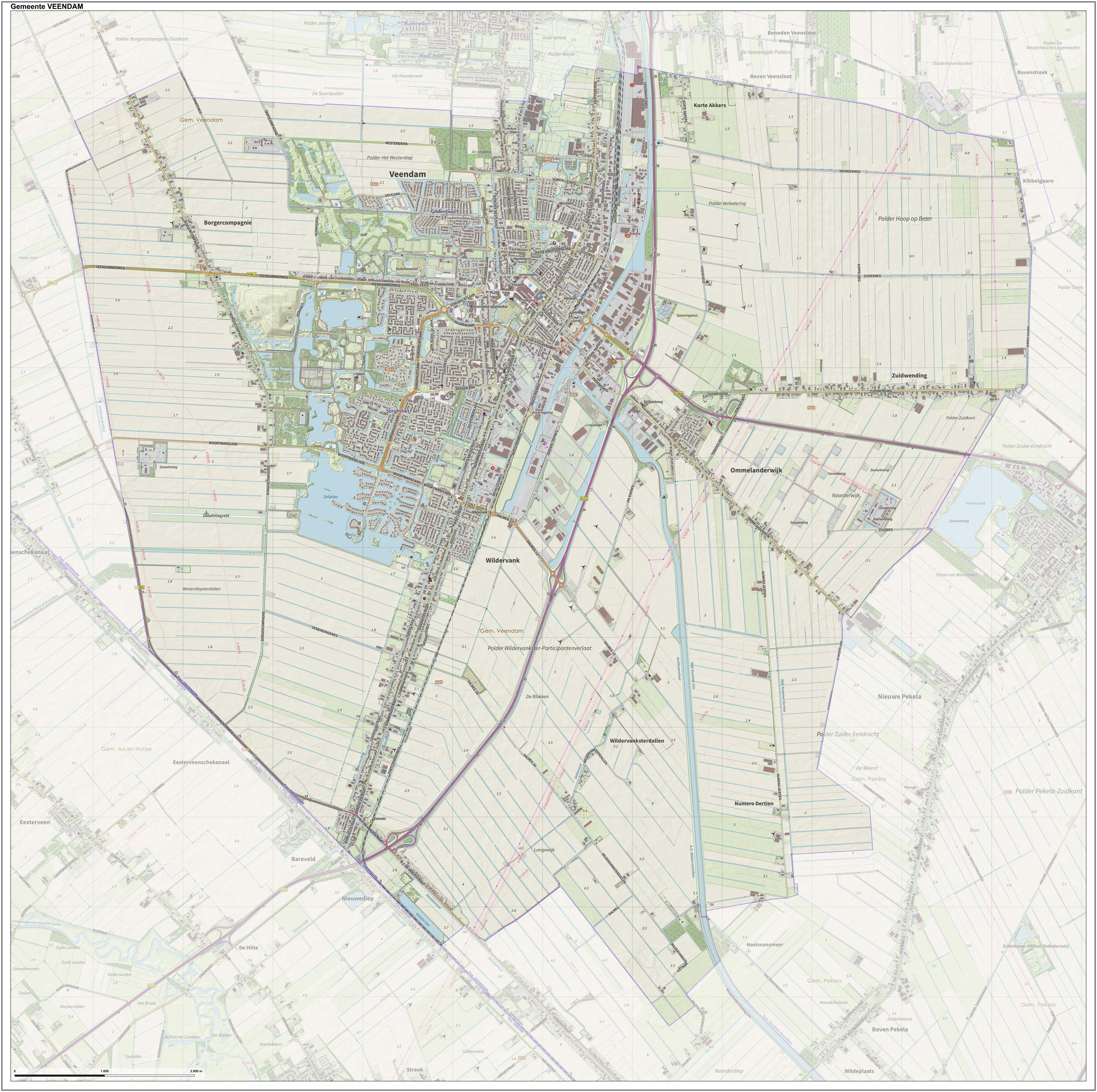
2014 map of the municipality

The population centres in the municipality are:

- Bareveld
- Borgercompagnie
- Kibbelgaarn
- Korte Akkers
- Numero Dertien
- Ommelanderwijk
- Tripscompagnie
- Veendam
- Wildervank
- Wildervanksterdallen
- Zuidwending

The municipality includes Westerdiepsterdallen, the smallest town in the Netherlands.

== Sports ==
=== Cycling ===
Veendam was the start place of stage 4b at the 2012 Energiewacht Tour and the finish place of stage 2 at the 2013 Energiewacht Tour.

=== Sport clubs ===
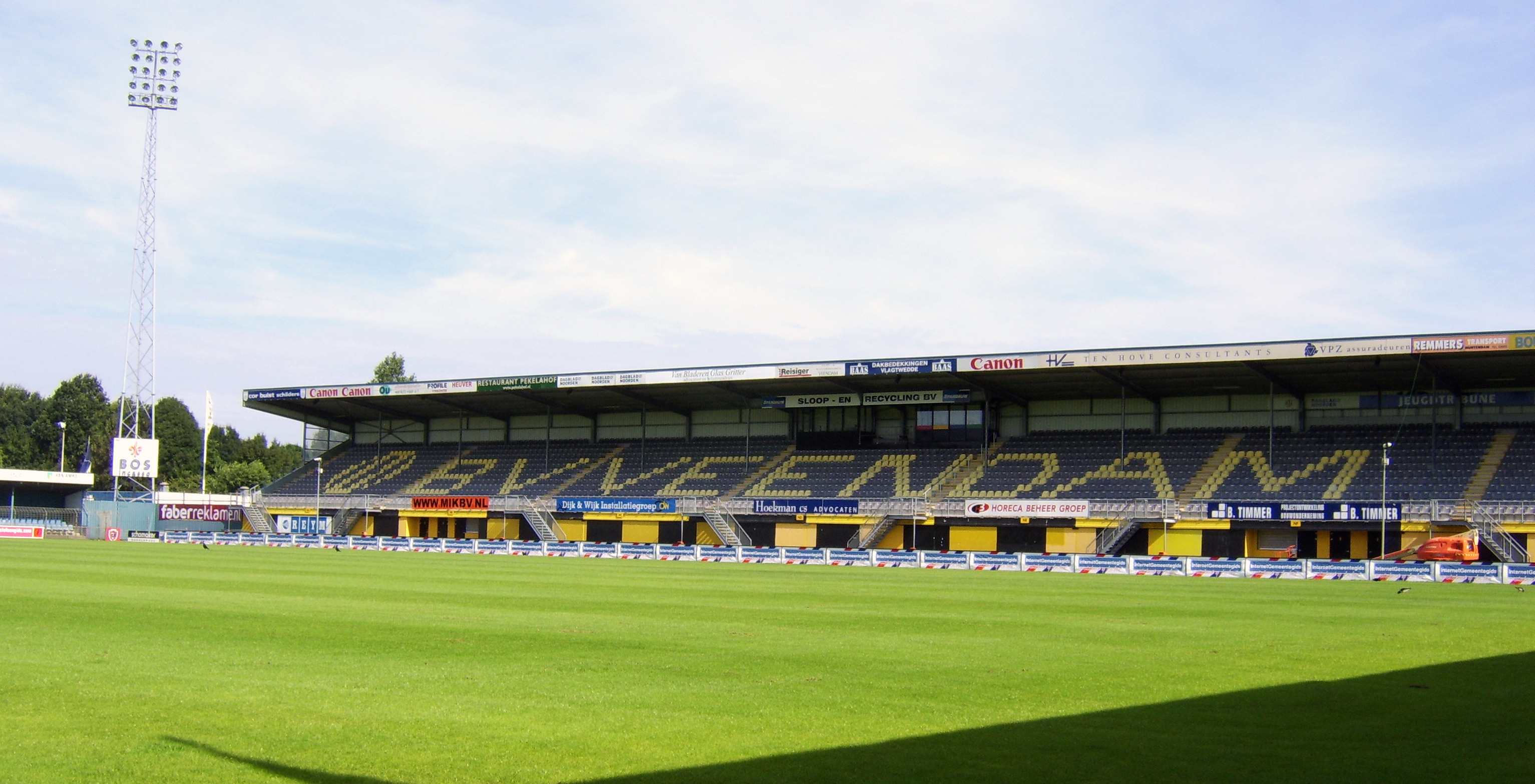
De Langeleegte football stadium formerly of SC Veendam

SC Veendam was the town's former soccer club. It was founded in 1894 and became professional in 1974. The team played mostly in the Eerste Divisie (the second tier of Dutch football) and spent two seasons in the top league Eredivisie. Their former stadium, with the dialect-influenced name De Langeleegte (Dutch: "De lange laagte," meaning "The long lowland," not literally "the long emptiness"), had a capacity of approximately 6,500 spectators. In 2013, the club became bankrupt and dissolved.

Flash Veendam is a local volleyball club and NNZC Veendam is a local gliding club.

== Transport ==
Veendam used to have a railway station on the Zuidbroek - Ter Apel line of the Noordoosterlocaalspoorweg-Maatschappij (NOLS). This station was closed to passenger trains in 1953 but the line remained in use for freight trains. Veendam railway station reopened in 2011 has reopened giving a passenger service via Zuidbroek to the city of Groningen. In 2025 the Nedersaksenlijn (Lower Saxony Line) was confirmed to be constructed that will connect Veendam south to Stadskanaal and beyond.

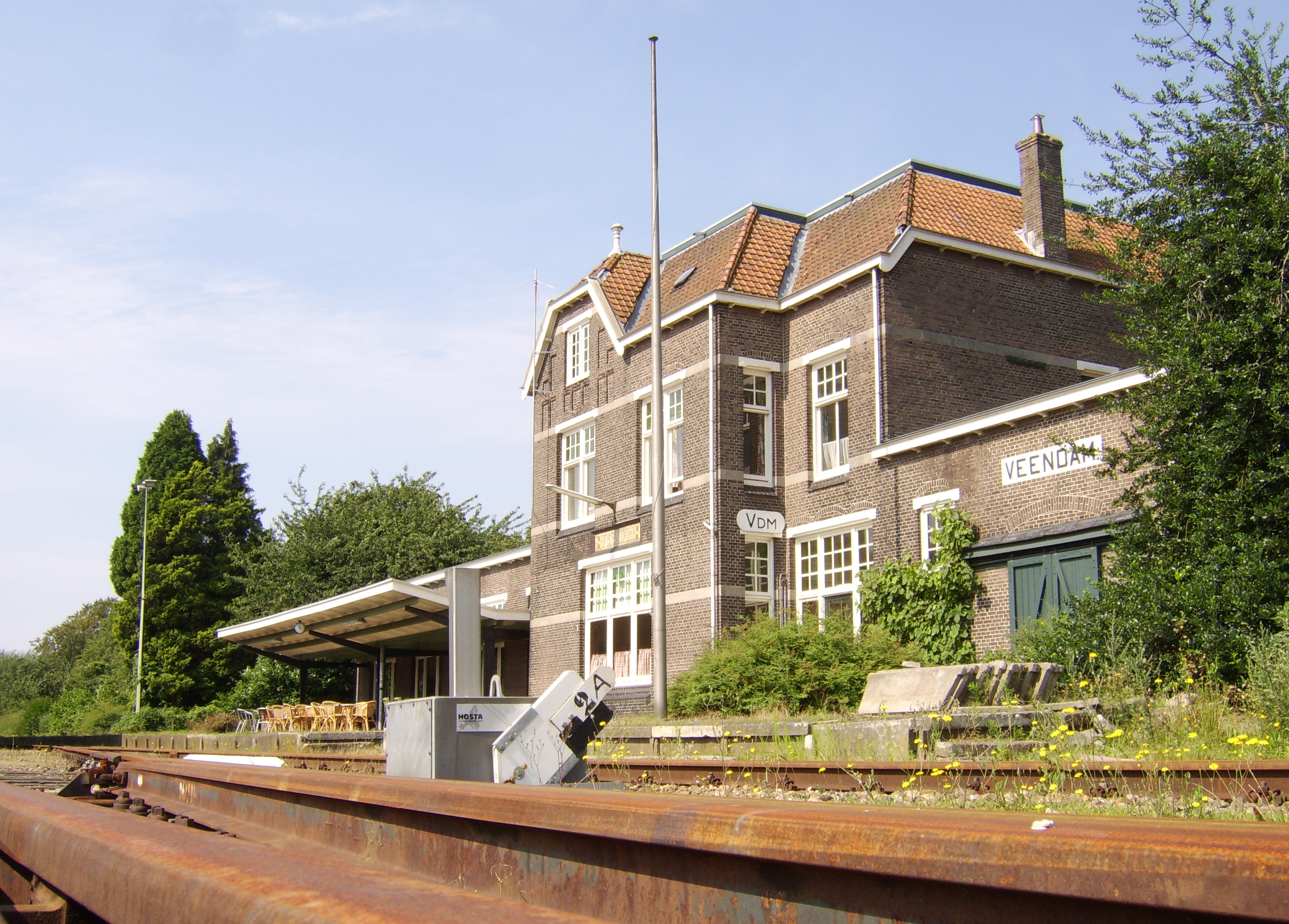
Old train station

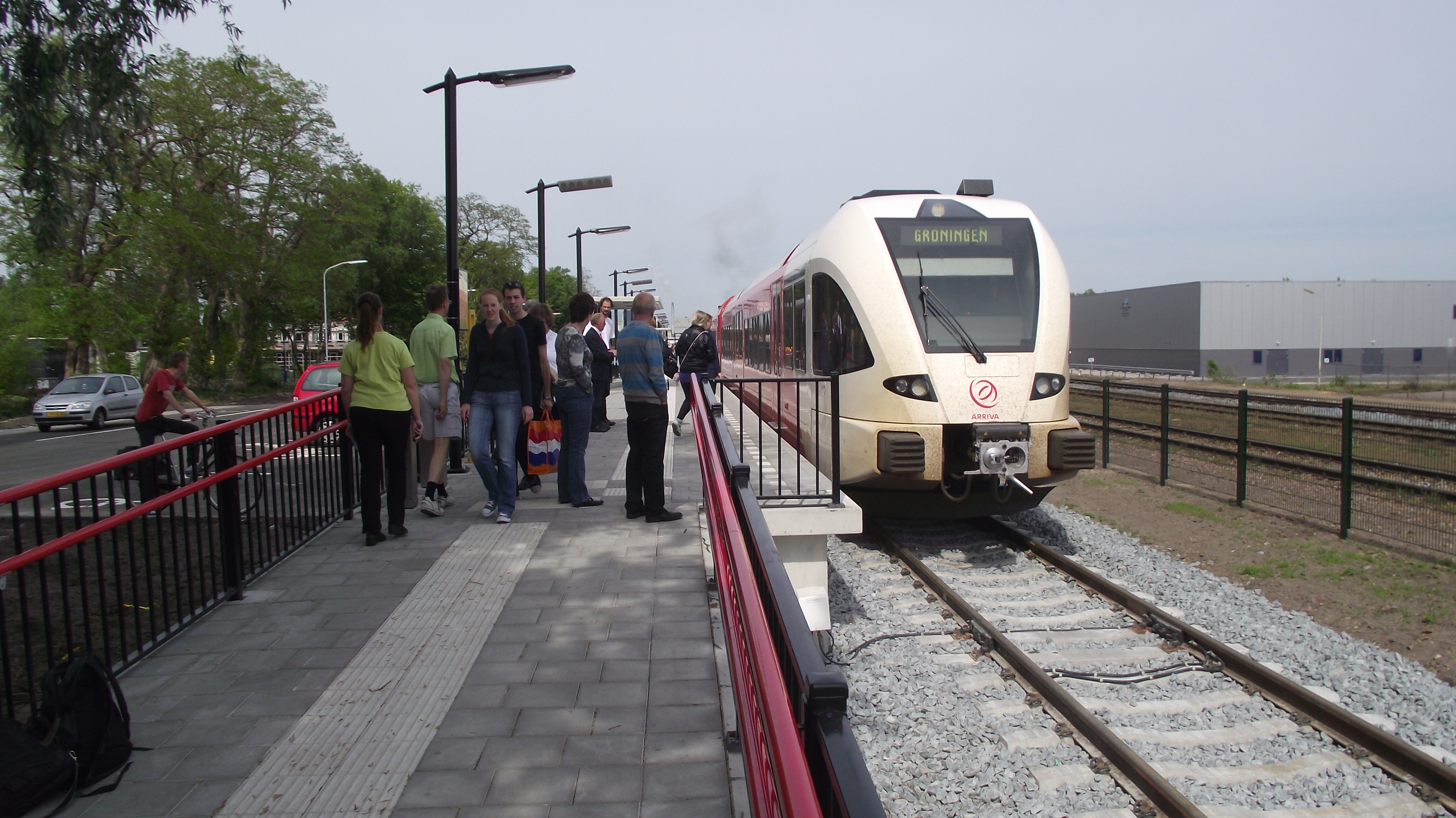
Arriva train at the new station

== International relations ==
Veendam has two sister cities:

- Gniezno, Poland
- Kelowna, British Columbia, Canada

== Notable residents ==
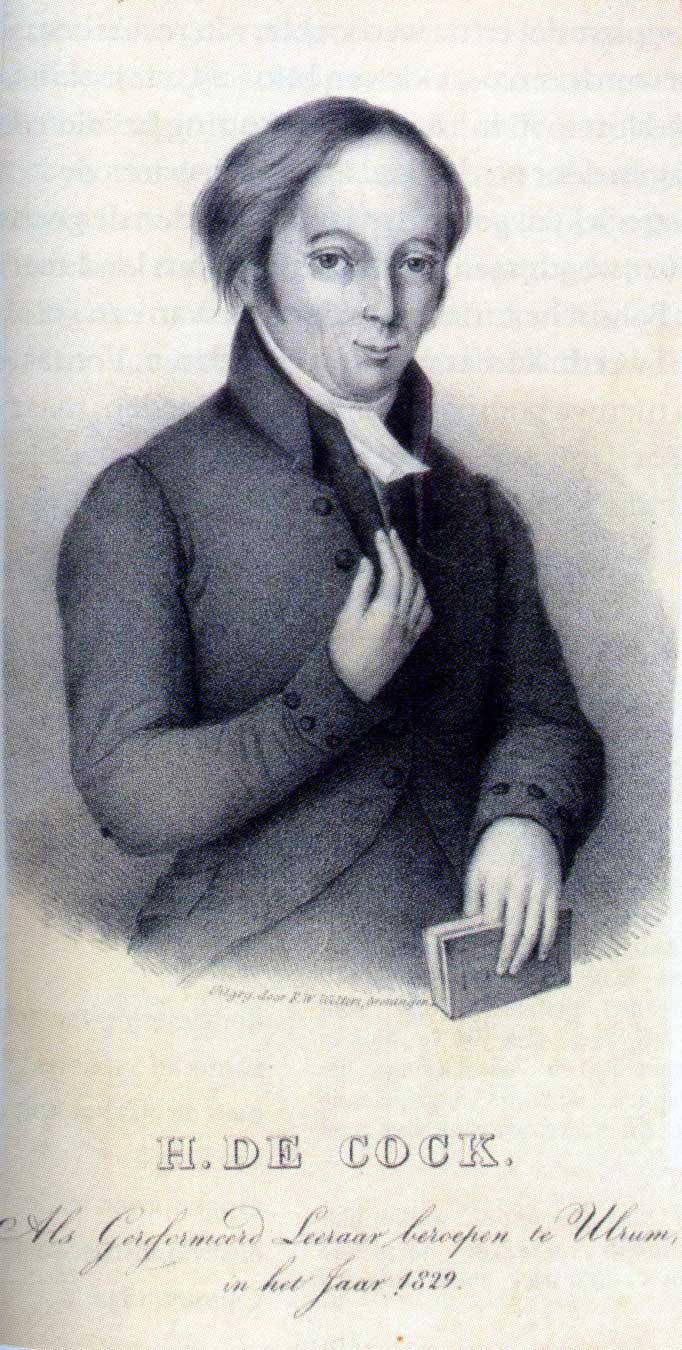
Hendrik de Cock, 1829

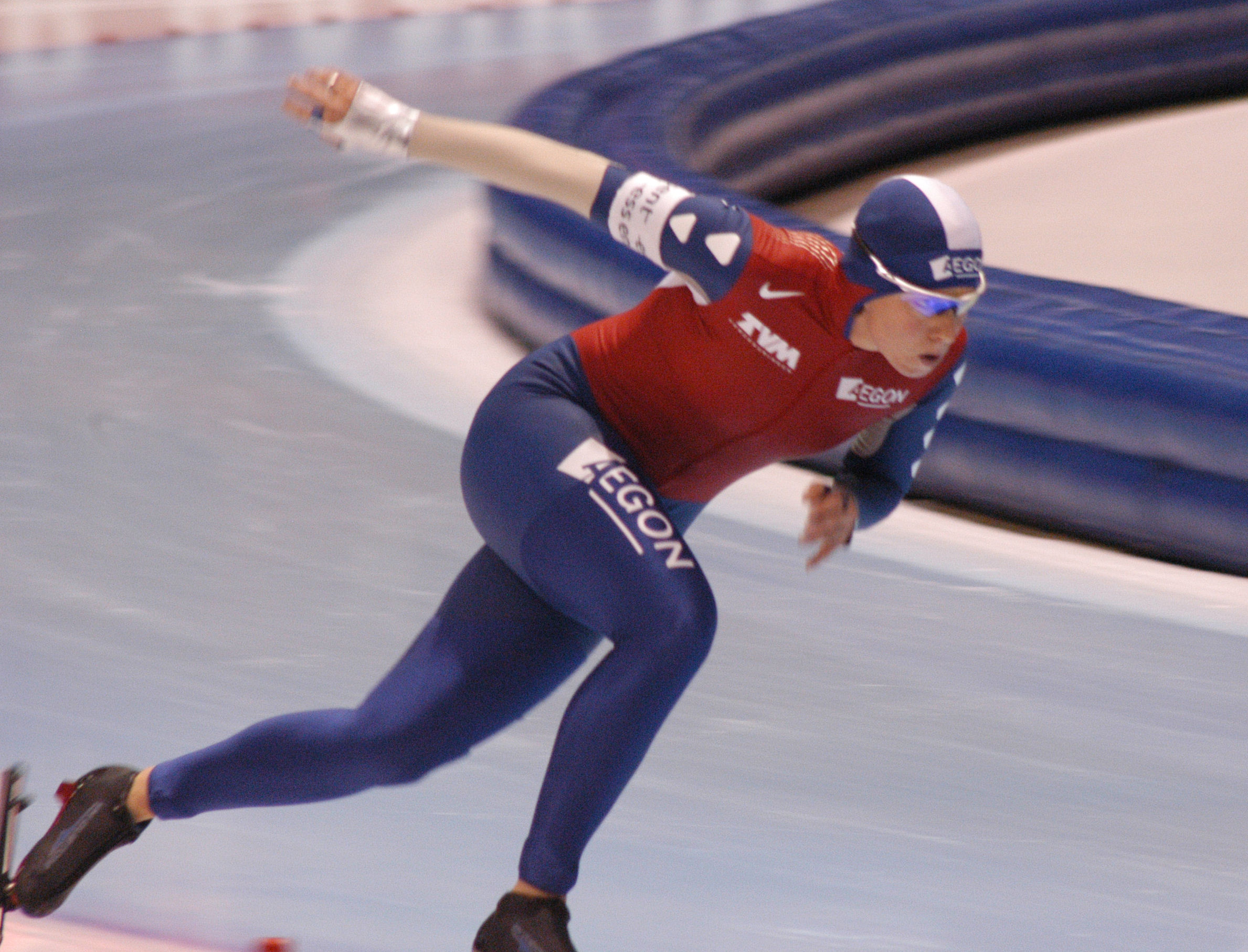
Renate Groenewold, 2007

- Hendrik de Cock (1801–1842) Dutch minister responsible for the 1834 Dutch Reformed Church split
- Anthony Winkler Prins (1817 in Voorst – 1908) Dutch writer, chief editor of the Winkler Prins encyclopedia.
- Herman Mees (1880–1964) Dutch artist, portrait painter, watercolorist and academic
- Herman Johannes Lam (1892–1977) Dutch botanist
- Addeke Hendrik Boerma (1912–1992) first Executive Director of the World Food Programme 1962-1967
- Gerda Geertens (born 1955 in Wildervank) Dutch composer

=== Sport ===
- Bert Romp (1958–2018) Dutch equestrian, gold medallist at the 1992 Summer Olympics
- Janette Bouman (born 1964) Dutch-born Kazakhstani dressage rider
- Rick Slor (born 1971) retired professional footballer with 509 club caps
- Anneke Venema (born 1971) retired rower, silver medallist at the 2000 Summer Olympics
- Linda Moes (born 1971) former breaststroke swimmer, competed at the 1988 Summer Olympics
- Peter Windt (born 1973) Dutch former field hockey player
- Renate Groenewold (born 1976) Dutch former long track speed skater, silver medallist at both the 2002 and the 2006 Winter Olympics
- Henk Grol (born 1985 in Winschoten) Dutch judoka, bronze medallist at both the 2008 and the 2012 Summer Olympics
- Jeroen Zoet (born 1991) Dutch professional football goalkeeper with over 250 club caps
