= Oosterbroek, Groningen =

Oosterbroek
- Former municipality
- Coat of arms

- Location within Groningen (province)
- Coordinates: 53°11′N 06°53′E
- Country: Netherlands
- Province: Groningen
- Period: 1965–1990

Oosterbroek (Dutch pronunciation: [ˈoːstərbruk]) is a former municipality in the province of Groningen in the Netherlands.

The municipality of Oosterbroek was created in 1965, when the municipalities of Noordbroek and Zuidbroek were merged. In 1990, the municipalities of Meeden and Muntendam were merged with Oosterbroek, which was renamed to Menterwolde a year later.
