= Zuidbroek railway station =

Railway station in Zuidbroek, the Netherlands

Zuidbroek
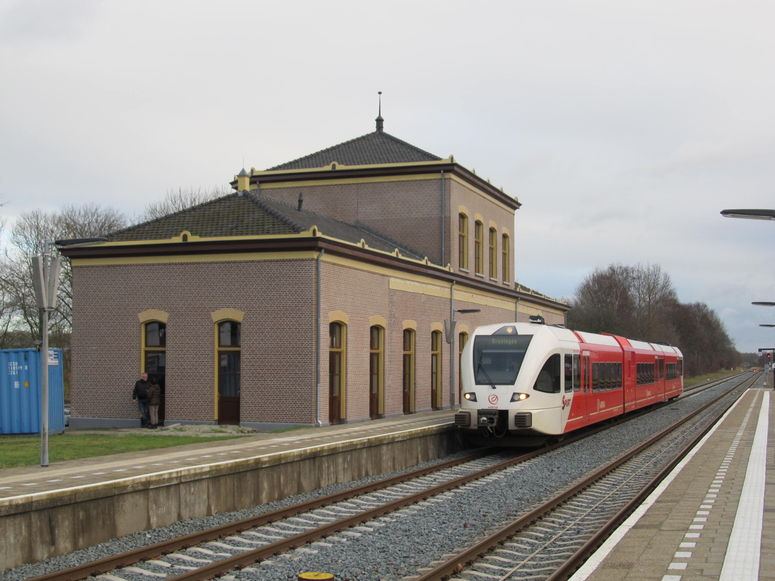
- Zuidbroek railway station in 2014

General information
- Location: Stationsstraat 5 Zuidbroek, Netherlands
- Coordinates: 53°09′33″N 6°52′02″E
- Operator: NS Stations
- Lines: Harlingen–Nieuweschans railway Stadskanaal–Zuidbroek railway
- Platforms: 3
- Tracks: 4
- Train operators: Arriva
- Bus operators: Qbuzz

Construction
- Architect: Karel Hendrik van Brederode

Other information
- Station code: Zb

History
- Opened: 1 May 1868

Services
Preceding station	Arriva Netherlands	Following station
Sappemeer Oost towards Groningen	Stoptrein 20100	Scheemda towards Leer
Sappemeer Oost towards Groningen	Stoptrein 37500	Scheemda towards Bad Nieuweschans
Sappemeer Oost towards Groningen	Stoptrein 37800	Veendam Terminus
Location
- Location within Netherlands

Zuidbroek (Dutch pronunciation: [zœydˈbruk]; abbreviation: Zb) is an unstaffed railway station in Zuidbroek in the Netherlands. It is located on the Harlingen–Nieuweschans railway between Sappemeer Oost and Scheemda, and at the northern end of the Stadskanaal–Zuidbroek railway after Veendam in the province of Groningen.

The station building was designed by Karel Hendrik van Brederode and completed in 1865. Train services started on 1 May 1868. The Noord-Nederlands Trein & Tram Museum has been housed in the station building since 2014.

At the station are four tracks and three platforms. The three local train services are operated by Arriva. The one and only bus connection is operated by Qbuzz and Taxi de Grooth.

== Location ==
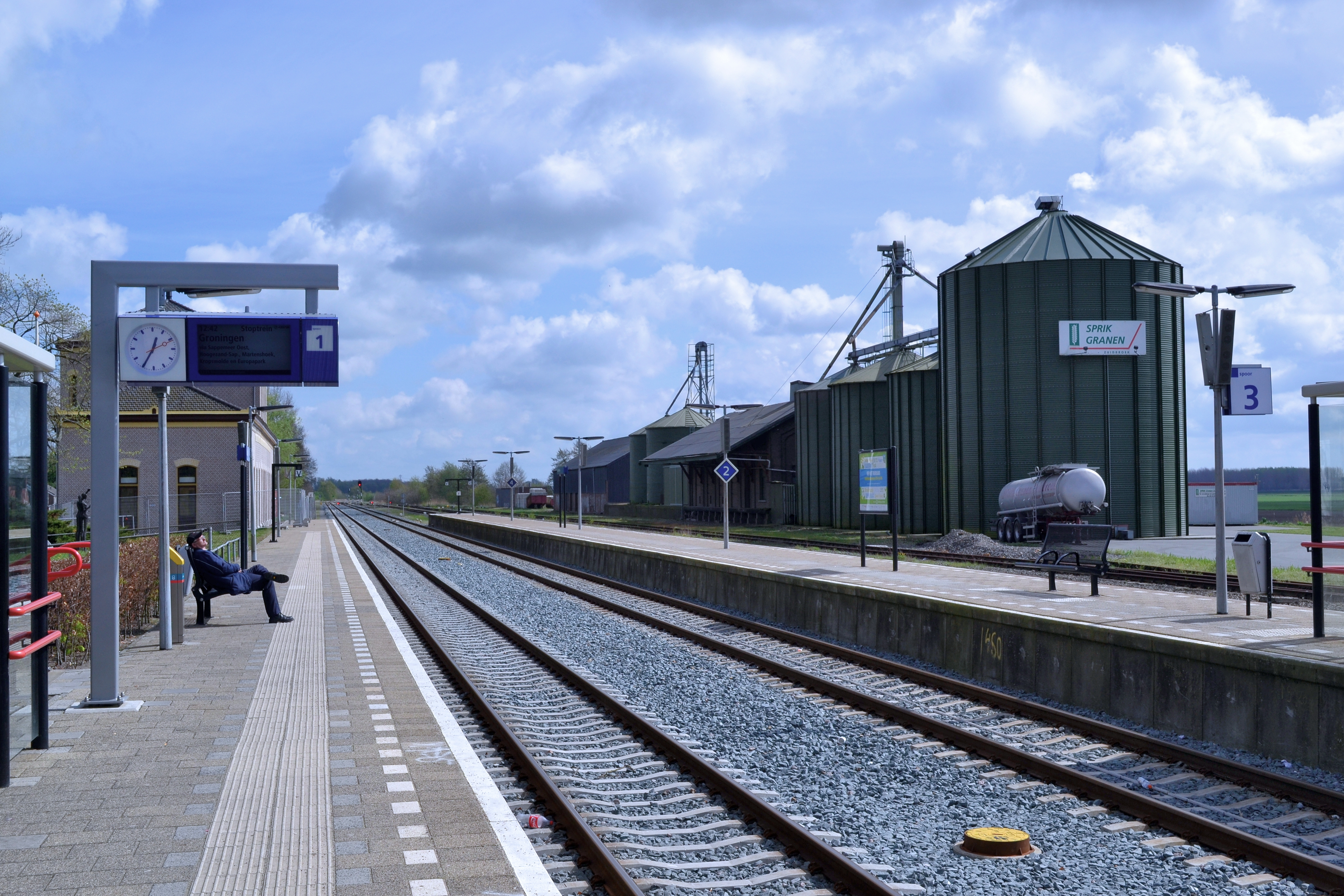
Overview of the platforms at the railway station in 2014

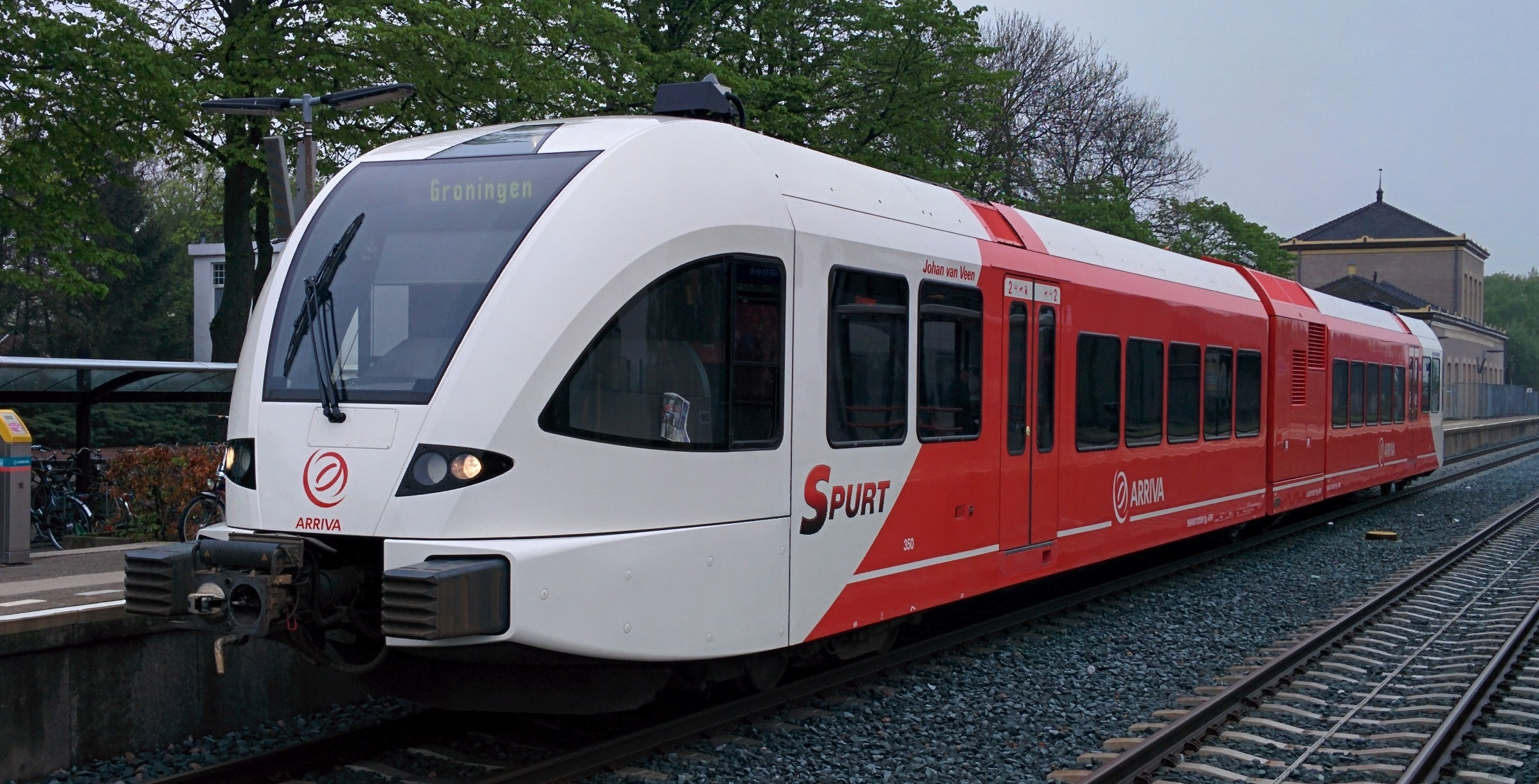
Arriva Spurt at Zuidbroek in 2014

The railway station is located at the Stationsstraat in the village of Zuidbroek, part of the municipality of Midden-Groningen, in the province of Groningen in the northeast of the Netherlands. It is situated on the Harlingen–Nieuweschans railway between the railway stations Sappemeer Oost and Scheemda. The Scholte railway stop was between Sappemeer Oost and Zuidbroek from 1933 to 1935. The distance from Zuidbroek westward to railway terminus Harlingen Haven is 102 km (63 mi), to Groningen 22 km (14 mi), and eastward to railway terminus Bad Nieuweschans 25 km (16 mi). Zuidbroek is situated at the northern end of the Stadskanaal–Zuidbroek railway after Veendam. The Meeden-Muntendam railway station was between Veendam and Zuidbroek from 1910 to 1941. The distance from Zuidbroek southward to Veendam is 7.4 km (4.6 mi) and to former railway terminus Stadskanaal was 22 km (14 mi). And Zuidbroek was also situated at the southern end of the Zuidbroek–Delfzijl railway before Zuidbroek Dorp from 1910 to 1934. The distance from Zuidbroek northward to railway terminus Delfzijl was 26 km (16 mi).

== History ==
The station building was completed in 1865. Train services on the Harlingen–Nieuweschans railway started on 1 May 1868.

Train services on the Zuidbroek–Delfzijl railway started on 5 January 1910 and on the Stadskanaal–Zuidbroek railway on 1 August 1910. The station building was renovated around 1912. Services on the Zuidbroek–Delfzijl railway on the segment between Zuidbroek and Weiwerd ended on 1 December 1934. During World War II after the German invasion of the Netherlands, services on the Stadskanaal–Zuidbroek railway were interrupted from 15 May 1939 to 29 May 1940. Services on the Stadskanaal–Zuidbroek railway ended on 17 May 1953. The station building was again renovated in 1959. There was another halt called Zuidbroek dorp in Zuidbroek on the Zuidbroek-Delfzijl railway.

In 2002–2012, the station building was restored to its original state. On 1 May 2011, the Stadskanaal–Zuidbroek railway was reopened between Veendam and Zuidbroek. Train services are provided by Arriva. Since 2014, the Noord-Nederlands Trein & Tram Museum has been housed in the station building.

== Building and layout ==
The 19th-century station building is of the type SS Hoogezand etc, which was designed by Karel Hendrik van Brederode. Nine station buildings of this type were built in the Netherlands, of which the building in Zuidbroek is the only one remaining today.

The double-track railway through Zuidbroek is unelectrified and oriented west to east. At the station are four tracks and three platforms, two of which form an island between the two middle tracks. Platform 1 is on the northern side of the tracks and serves trains towards Groningen. Platform 2 is on the northern side of the island and serves trains towards Bad Nieuweschans and Veendam. Platform 3 is on the southern side of the island.

== Train services ==
Route	Service type	Operator	Notes
Groningen - Hoogezand-Sappemeer - Zuidbroek - Veendam	Local ("Stoptrein")	Arriva	2x per hour - 1x per hour on evenings and Sundays.
Groningen - Hoogezand-Sappemeer - Zuidbroek - Winschoten - Bad Nieuweschans - Leer (Germany)	Local ("Stoptrein")	Arriva	1x per hour
Groningen - Hoogezand-Sappemeer - Zuidbroek - Winschoten (- Bad Nieuweschans)	Local ("Stoptrein")	Arriva	1x per hour - 1x per 2 hours on Sundays. During morning rush hour and on evenings, a couple of runs run through to Bad Nieuweschans.

== Bus services ==
Line	Route	Operator	Notes
174	(Groningen - Westerbroek - Hoogezand - Sappemeer -) Zuidbroek - Muntendam - Veendam	Qbuzz and Taxi de Grooth	The route between Groningen and Zuidbroek is only served during rush hours. No service after 22:50 (weekdays), on Saturday evenings (entirely), Sunday mornings and after 22:20 (Sunday evenings).
