= Rick Slor =

Dutch footballer

Personal information
- Full name: Rick Slor
- Date of birth: 16 August 1971 (age 55)
- Place of birth: Veendam, Netherlands
- Position: Defender

Senior career*
Years	Team	Apps	(Gls)
1989–1992	BV Veendam	77	(3)
1992–1994	FC Groningen	50	(0)
1994–1999	BV Veendam	182	(4)
1999–2002	FC Emmen	84	(0)
2002–2006	BV Veendam	116	(7)
Total		509	(14)
- * Club domestic league appearances and goals as of 15 March 2009

Rick Slor (born 16 August 1971) is a retired professional footballer from the Netherlands, who played for clubs like FC Groningen, FC Emmen and BV Veendam.
