= Noord-Nederlands Trein & Tram Museum =

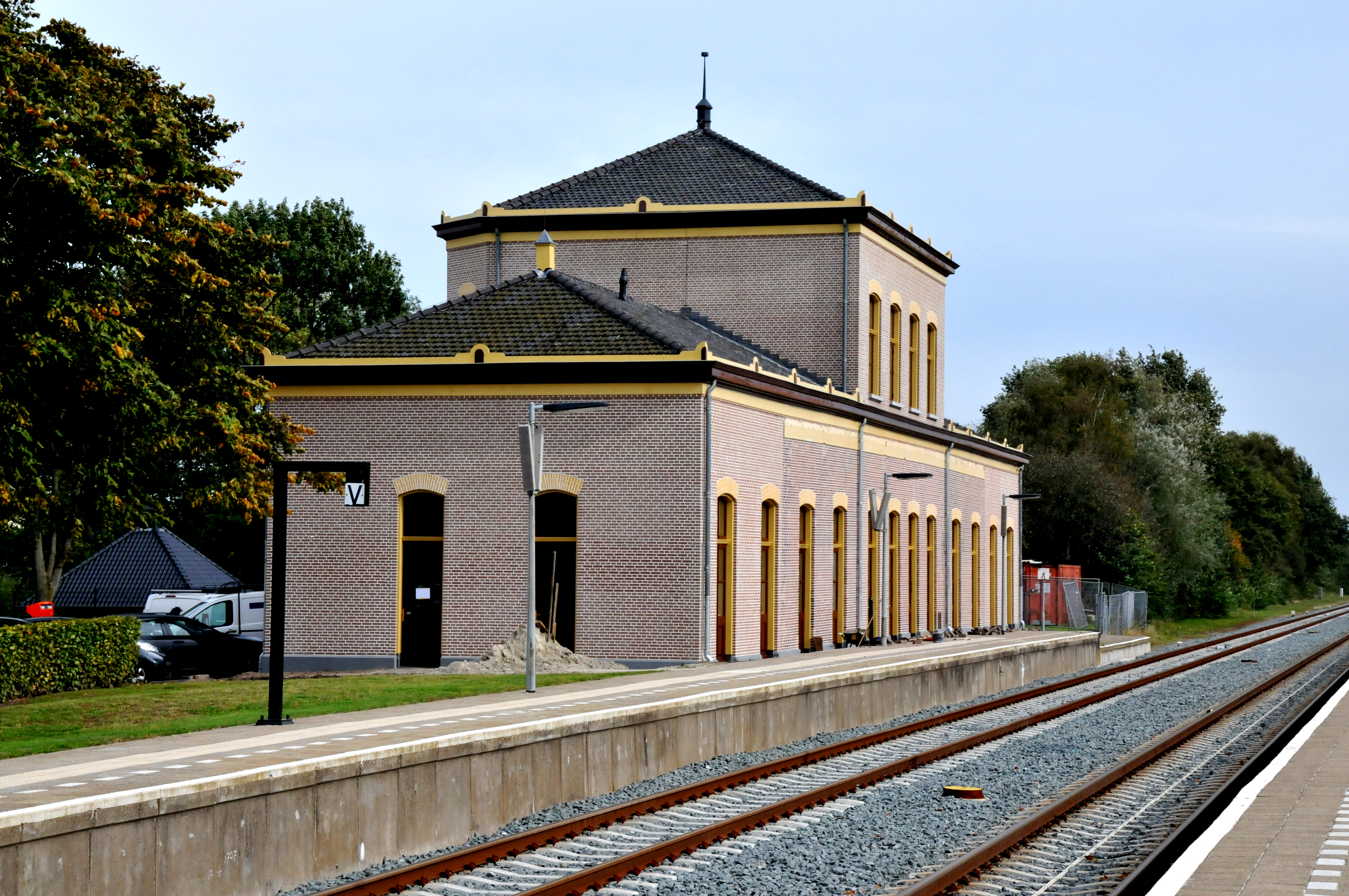
- Museum building in 2014

- Location in Groningen, Netherlands
- Established: 10 October 2014
- Location: Stationsstraat 5 Zuidbroek, Netherlands
- Coordinates: 53°9′33″N 6°52′2″E
- Type: Railway museum
- Visitors: 3,868 (2015)
- Public transit access: Zuidbroek railway station
- Website: nnttm.nl

Noord-Nederlands Trein & Tram Museum (Dutch pronunciation: [ˌnoːrt ˈneːdərlɑnts ˈtrɛin ɛn ˈtrɛm myˈzeːjʏm]; English: North Netherlands Train & Tram Museum) is a railway museum in Zuidbroek, Netherlands. It is situated in the 19th-century building of the Zuidbroek railway station.

In 2011, the Province of Groningen provided a subsidy of 100,000 euro for the restoration of the station building and the exploitation of the museum. The museum was opened on 10 October 2014 by State Secretary for Infrastructure and the Environment, Wilma Mansveld. It had 1,517 visitors in 2014 and 3,868 visitors in 2015.

The museum is a member of the Museumhuis Groningen (Museum House Groningen), an umbrella organization for museums and heritage institutions in the province of Groningen.

Year	Visitors
2014	1,517
2015	3,868
2016	TBA
