= Jan de Blécourt =

Dutch sports shooter

Personal information
- Full name: Jan Johannes de Blécourt
- Born: 13 July 1860 Wildervank, Netherlands
- Died: 20 March 1925 (aged 64) Laag-Soeren, Netherlands

Sport
- Sport: Sports shooting

Dr. Jan Johannes de Blécourt (13 July 1860 – 20 March 1925) was a Dutch sports shooter.

== Personal life ==
Born in Wildervank, in the province of Groningen, in 1860, he later lived in Hees, Nijmegen. He died on 20 March 1925 in Laag-Soeren at the age of 64.

== Sport career ==
De Blécourt is most notable for competing at the 1908 Summer Olympics where he competed in two different events.

At the 1908 Summer Olympics, De Blécourt complained about serious irregularities in how points were recorded during the shooting competition. He stated here were no clear, fixed rules on how to score shots that touched the ring lines on the target. Some referees counted a hit that just touched the upper line (for example, giving 8 points if the shot touched the line of the 8-ring). Others referees said the bullet had to pass halfway through the ring line to earn those points. This inconsistency caused major differences in scorin because there were no possibility of later verification. After every ten shots, the targets were covered over, so no later review or correction of the scores was possible.

Apart from that he stated that the shooting conditions were unfair because in the pistol event, competitors had to fire six shots within four minutes. De Blécourt found this four minures rule disgraceful and said that, had he known about it in advance, he would not have come to compete. Apart from De Blécourt, the Belgian team captain also considered leaving the range after noticing through his binoculars that the scoring was being marked incorrectly.
