= Anthony Winkler Prins =

Dutch encyclopedist and writer

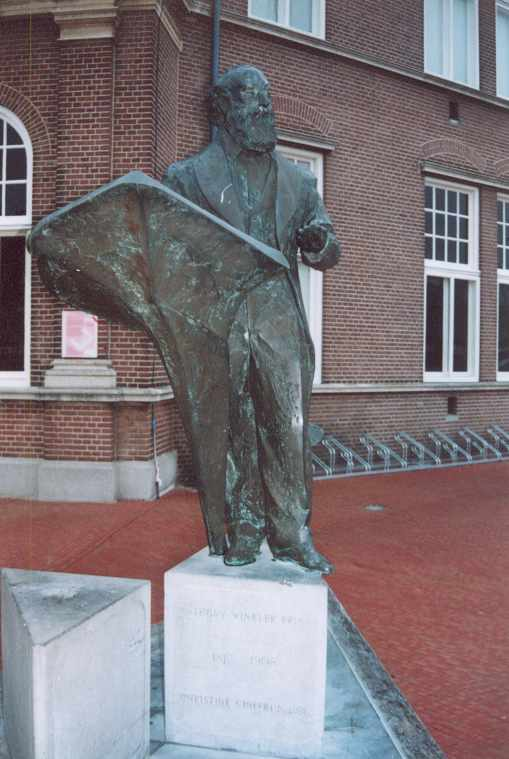
Anthony Winkler Prins

Anthony Winkler Prins (30 or 31 January 1817 in Voorst – 4 January 1908 in Voorburg) was a Dutch writer. He is remembered mostly for being chief editor of the Winkler Prins encyclopedia.

Besides being an encyclopedist, Winkler Prins (a double surname) was a "Doopsgezind" (Mennonite) preacher. He also wrote editorials for many newspapers, as well as poetry.

Winkler Prins studied science and literature in Utrecht and later studied theology at the Doopsgezind Seminarium (Mennonite Seminary) in Amsterdam. From 1841 to 1850, he preached in the village of Tjalleberd.

From 1850 to 1882, Winkler Prins preached in the northern town of Veendam, where he completed his encyclopedia in 1882. He was very important to the community, not just as a preacher, but also because he founded a high school, a seafaring school and a Masonic Lodge.

After he retired as a preacher in 1882, he went to live with his daughter in Voorburg, where he died and was interred in 1908. A statue of Winkler Prins was erected outside the Veenkoloniaal Museum ("Peat Colony Museum") in Veendam in 1991; see photo. On 9 September 2005, the Museum had the remains of Winkler Prins and his wife Henderika reburied in the graveyard of the Reformed Church in Veendam.

Winkler Prins' son Jacob (born in Tjalleberd on 5 February 1849, died at sea on 25 November 1907) was a poet (mostly of sonnets) and a painter.
