= Veendam railway station =

Dutch railway station

Veendam
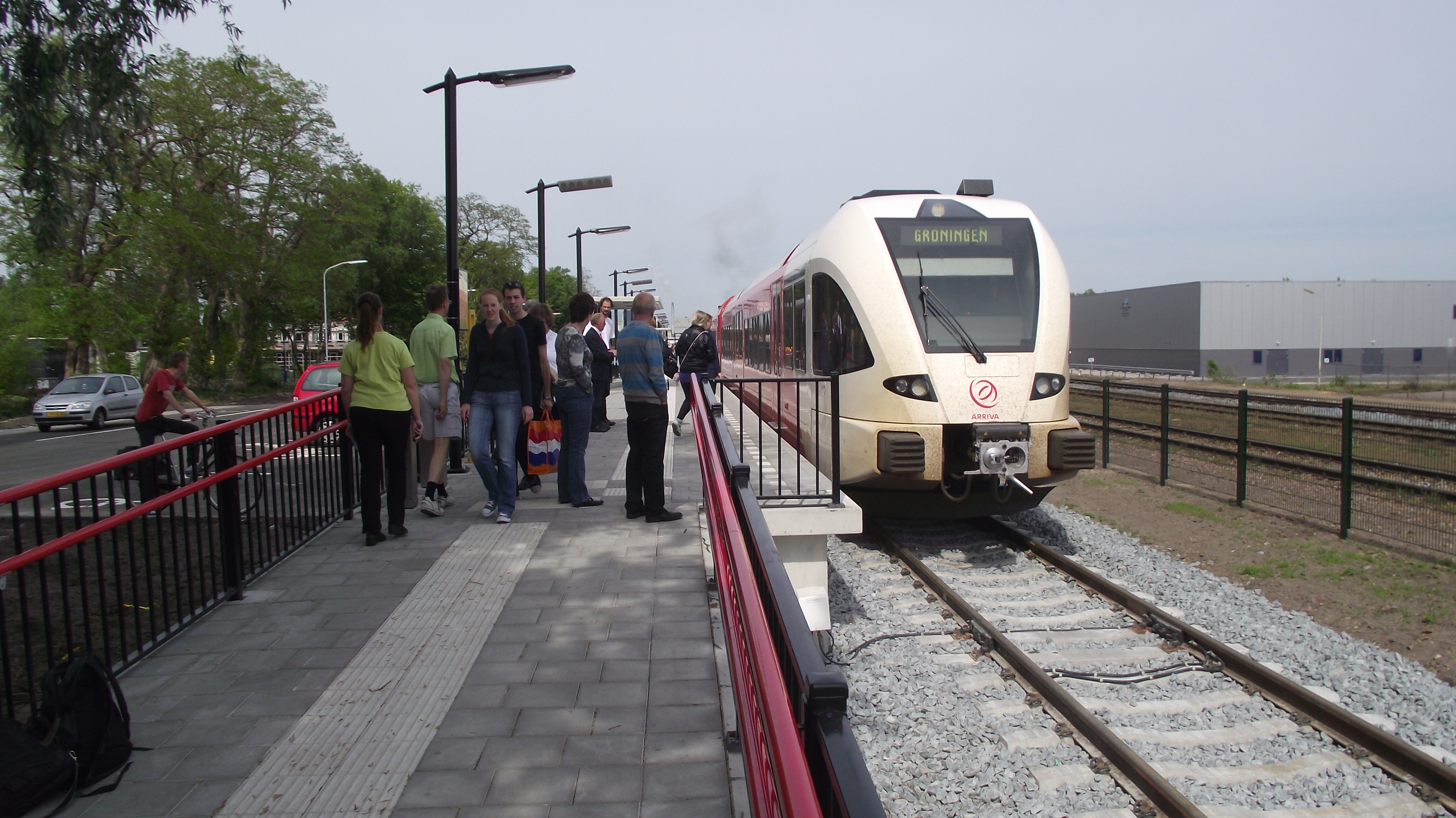
- Veendam railway station on the day it reopened (2011)

General information
- Location: Parallelweg; Veendam, Netherlands
- Coordinates: 53°06′13″N 6°53′05″E
- Operator: NS Stations
- Line: Stadskanaal–Zuidbroek railway
- Train operators: Arriva
- Bus operators: Qbuzz, Taxi De Grooth, CTS

Other information
- Station code: Vdm

History
- Opened: 1 August 1910; reopened 1 May 2011
- Closed: 17 May 1953

Services
Preceding station	Arriva Netherlands	Following station
Zuidbroek towards Groningen	Stoptrein 37800	Terminus
Location
- Location within Netherlands

Veendam (Dutch pronunciation: [veːnˈdɑm]; abbreviation: Vdm) is an unstaffed railway station in Veendam in the Netherlands. It is located on the Stadskanaal–Zuidbroek railway after Zuidbroek as the present-day line terminus.

== Location ==
The railway station is located at the Parallelweg in the village of Veendam in the province of Groningen in the northeast of the Netherlands. It is situated on the Stadskanaal–Zuidbroek railway, where it is the present-day line terminus before the railway station Zuidbroek.

== History ==
The station was previously served by passenger trains from 1 August 1910 to 17 May 1953. The station reopened on 1 May 2011, when the Veendam–Zuidbroek section of the Stadskanaal–Zuidbroek railway was reopened to passenger services.

== Train services ==
Route	Service type	Operator	Notes
Groningen - Hoogezand-Sappemeer - Zuidbroek - Veendam	Local ("Stoptrein")	Arriva	2x per hour - 1x per hour on evenings and Sundays.

== Bus services ==
Line	Route	Operator	Notes
13	Veendam - Muntendam - Meeden - Westerlee - Heiligerlee - Winschoten	Qbuzz, Taxi De Grooth and CTS	Mon-Fri during daytime hours only, with one extra run during weekday evenings.
23	Winschoten - Oude Pekela - Nieuwe Pekela - Ommelanderwijk - Veendam	Qbuzz	
110	Veendam - Wildervank - Bareveld - Gieten - Rolde - Assen	Qbuzz	
171	Veendam - Kiel-Windeweer - Hoogezand - Groningen Centrum (Downtown) - Groningen Zernike (campus)	Qbuzz	Operates 2x per hour locally within Veendam and 1x per hour to/from Groningen. On Saturdays, this bus only operates locally within Veendam. No Sunday service.
174	(Groningen - Westerbroek - Hoogezand - Sappemeer -) Zuidbroek - Muntendam - Veendam	Qbuzz and Taxi De Grooth	The route between Groningen and Zuidbroek is only served during rush hours. No service after 22:50 (weekdays), on Saturday evenings (entirely), Sunday mornings and after 22:20 (Sunday evenings).
510	Veendam Station - Veendam Centrum (town centre) - Veendam Parkflat - Veendam Skagerrak - Wildervank Bijleveldcentrum	Taxi De Grooth	No service during morning rush hours; service starts after morning rush hours. On Mondays, this bus starts operating at 12:45. No service during evenings and on Sundays.
