= Winkler Prins =

Dutch encyclopedia

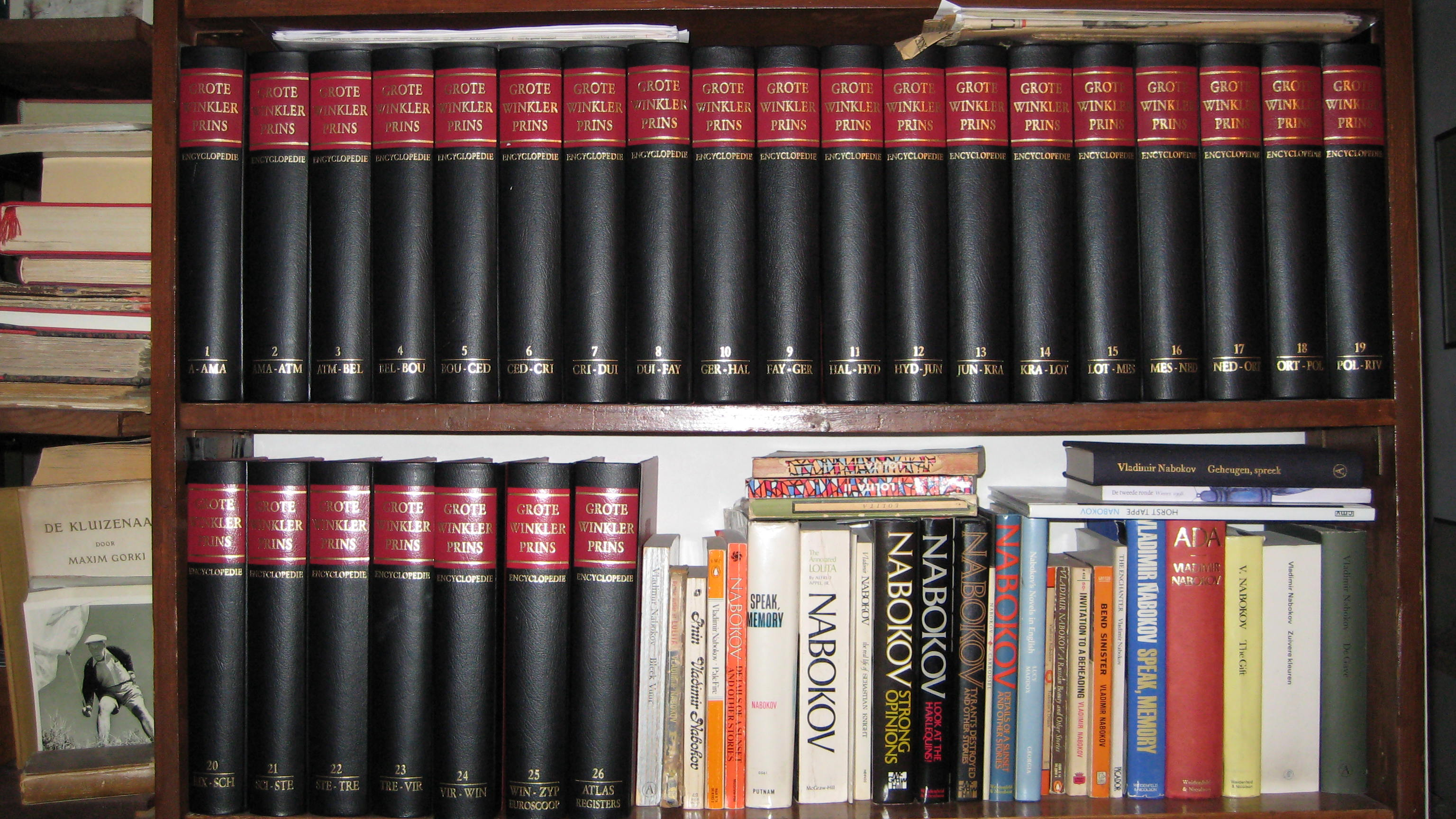
The Grote Winkler Prins, 9th edition

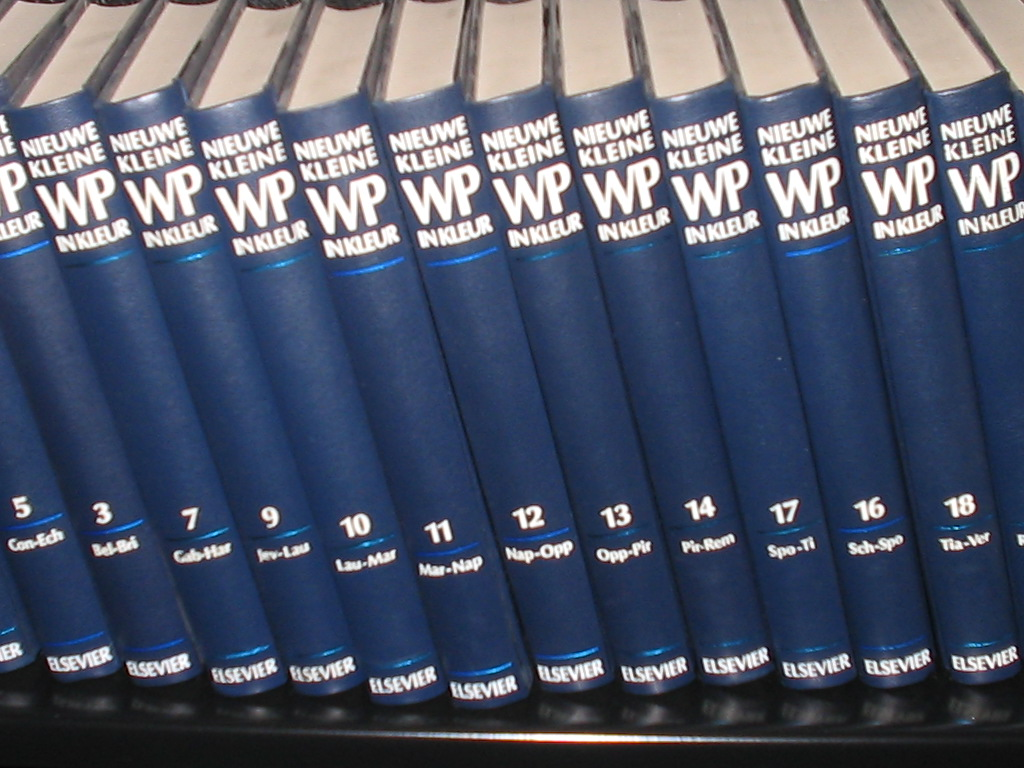
The Nieuwe Kleine (new small) edition of the Winkler Prins

The Winkler Prins is a Dutch-language encyclopedia, founded by the Dutch poet and clergyman Anthony Winkler Prins (1817–1908) and published by Elsevier. It has run through nine printed editions; the first, issued in 16 volumes from 1870 to 1882, and the last (the final in book form), numbering 26 volumes, from 1990 to 1993. Winkler Prins has been the most distinguished printed encyclopedia in the Dutch language. Publisher Elsevier collaborated with the Microsoft Corporation to put the 1993 version plus any new additions onto CD-ROM in 1997 as the Dutch-language version of Encarta.

Since 2020, Winkler Prins online has two subscription-based editions: Junior Winkler Prins online (for primary education from age 6+; c. 2,700 entries as of 2022), and Studie Winkler Prins online (for primary and secondary education from age 10+; c. 11,500 entries as of 2022).

== Editions ==
- Geïllustreerde Encyclopædie: Woordenboek voor wetenschap en kunst, beschaving en nijverheid. Chief editor: A. Winkler Prins. 15 vol. A-Z and one vol. (16) with illustrations, 1870–1882. Amsterdam: Brinkman.
- Geïllustreerde Encyclopaedie: Woordenboek voor wetenschap en kunst, beschaving en nijverheid. 2nd ed. (2de, naar de nieuwste bronnen herziene en aanmerkelijk vermeerderde uitgave.) Chief editor: A. Winkler Prins. 15 vol., 1884–88. Supplement (vol. 16), 1888. Rotterdam: Elsevier.
- Winkler Prins' Geïllustreerde Encyclopaedie. 3rd ed. (3de, geheel om- en bijgewerkte druk.) Chief editor: Henri Zondervan. 16 vol., 1905–1912. Amsterdam: Elsevier.
- Winkler Prins' Geïllustreerde Encyclopaedie. 4th ed. (4de herziene en bijgewerkte druk.) Chief editor: Henri Zondervan. 16 vol., 1914–1922. Amsterdam: Elsevier. via HathiTrust
  - v.1: A-Ar (1914)
  - v.2: Ar-Be (1915)
  - v.4: Bo-Ce (1915)
  - v.6: Da-Em
  - v.8: Ge-Ha (1917)
  - v.10: It-Ku
  - v.11: Kuh-Mar (1919)
  - v.12: Ma-No
  - v.14: Po-Sc (1921)
  - v.15: Sch-Tri (1922)
  - v.16: Tr-Z
- Winkler Prins' Algemeene Encyclopaedie. 5th ed. (5de geheel nieuwe druk.) Chief editor: J. de Vries. 16 vol., 1932–1938. Amsterdam: Elsevier.
- Winkler Prins Encyclopaedie. 6th ed. (6de, geheel nieuwe druk.) Chief editors: E. de Bruyne, G. B. J. Hiltermann, H. R. Hoetink. 18 vol., 1947–1954. Supplement, 1955, 1960, 1969. Amsterdam [etc.]: Elsevier.
- Algemene Winkler Prins Encyclopedie. Chief editors: H. R. Hoetink, E. de Bruyne, J. F. Koksma, R. F. Lissens, J. Presser. 10 vol., 1956–1960. Supplement, 1960. Amsterdam [etc.]: Elsevier
- Grote Winkler Prins: Encyclopedie in twintig delen. 7th ed. (7de geheel nieuwe druk.) Chief editors: J. F. Staal, A. J. Wiggers. 20 vol., 1966–1975. Supplement, 1976. Amsterdam [etc.]: Elsevier.
- Grote Winkler Prins: Encyclopedie in 25 delen. 8th ed. (8ste geheel nieuwe druk.) Chief editors: R. C. van Caenegem en S. Groenman. 25 vol., 1979–1984. Supplement, 1984. Amsterdam [etc.]: Elsevier.
- Grote Winkler Prins: Encyclopedie in 26 delen. 9th ed. (9de geheel nieuwe druk.) Chief editor: L. C. M. Röst. 26 vol., 1990–1993. Amsterdam [etc.]: Elsevier.
- "(CD-ROM version)". Encarta Encyclopedie Winkler Prins (in Dutch). Microsoft Corporation/Het Spectrum. 1993–2002.

== Bibliography ==
- Loveland, Jeff (2019). The European Encyclopedia: From 1650 to the Twenty-First Century. Cambridge: Cambridge University Press. p. 460. ISBN 9781108481090.
- "Winkler Prins Encyclopedieën". Encarta Encyclopedie Winkler Prins (in Dutch). Microsoft Corporation/Het Spectrum. 1993–2002.
