= Wildervank =

- Village
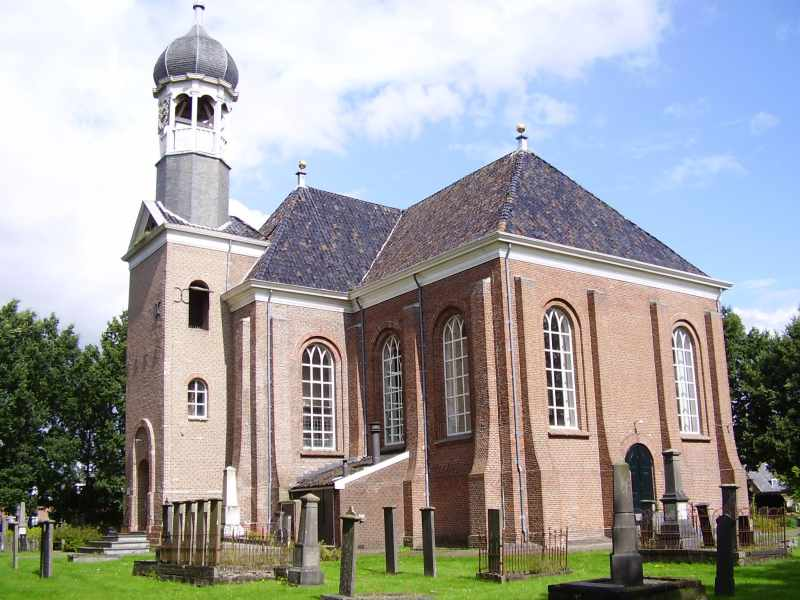
- Protestant Church in 2005

- Flag Coat of arms

- Location in the province of Groningen in the Netherlands Wildervank (Netherlands)
- Coordinates: 53°05′N 6°52′E
- Country: Netherlands
- Province: Groningen
- Municipality: Veendam
- Established: 1647

Area
  - Total: 28.09 km^{2} (10.85 sq mi)
- Elevation: 2 m (6.6 ft)

Population (2021)
  - Total: 5,455
  - Density: 194.2/km^{2} (503.0/sq mi)
- Postal code: 9648
- Area code: 0598
- Major roads: N33

Wildervank is a village in the Dutch province of Groningen. It is located in the municipality of Veendam, about 3 km south of the centre of Veendam itself. It was founded in 1647 by Adriaan Geerts Wildervanck as a peat colony in the Wildervankster bog. Wildervank was a separate municipality until 1969, when the area was divided between Veendam and Stadskanaal.

== History ==
The Wildervankster bog was a raised bog located to the west of Oude Pekela. Adriaan Geerts settled in Oude Pekela to study the exploitation of peat by the city of Groningen. The Wildevankster bog was still untouched, and Geerts wanted to purchase it. He bought the bog in 1647 in order to establish his own peat colony, but needed to procure a ƒ250,000 mortgage from an Amsterdam merchant. Geerts would later use the surname Wildervanck. The colony was moderately successful, however the heavy mortgage payments forced Wildervanck to sell large parts of the colony.

In 1687, the church was finished in Wildervank. It was named Margaretha Hardenberg Church after the wife of Adriaan Wildervanck. The parish separated from Oude Pekela in 1702. Wildervank was originally a linear settlement along the canal. It would remain an independent municipality until 1969 when it merged into Veendam except for a small part which was added to Stadskanaal.

== Notable people ==
- Jan de Blécourt (1860–1925), Dutch olympic sports shooter
- Gerda Geertens (born 1955), Dutch composer
