= Zuidbroek, Groningen =

Zuidbroek
- Village
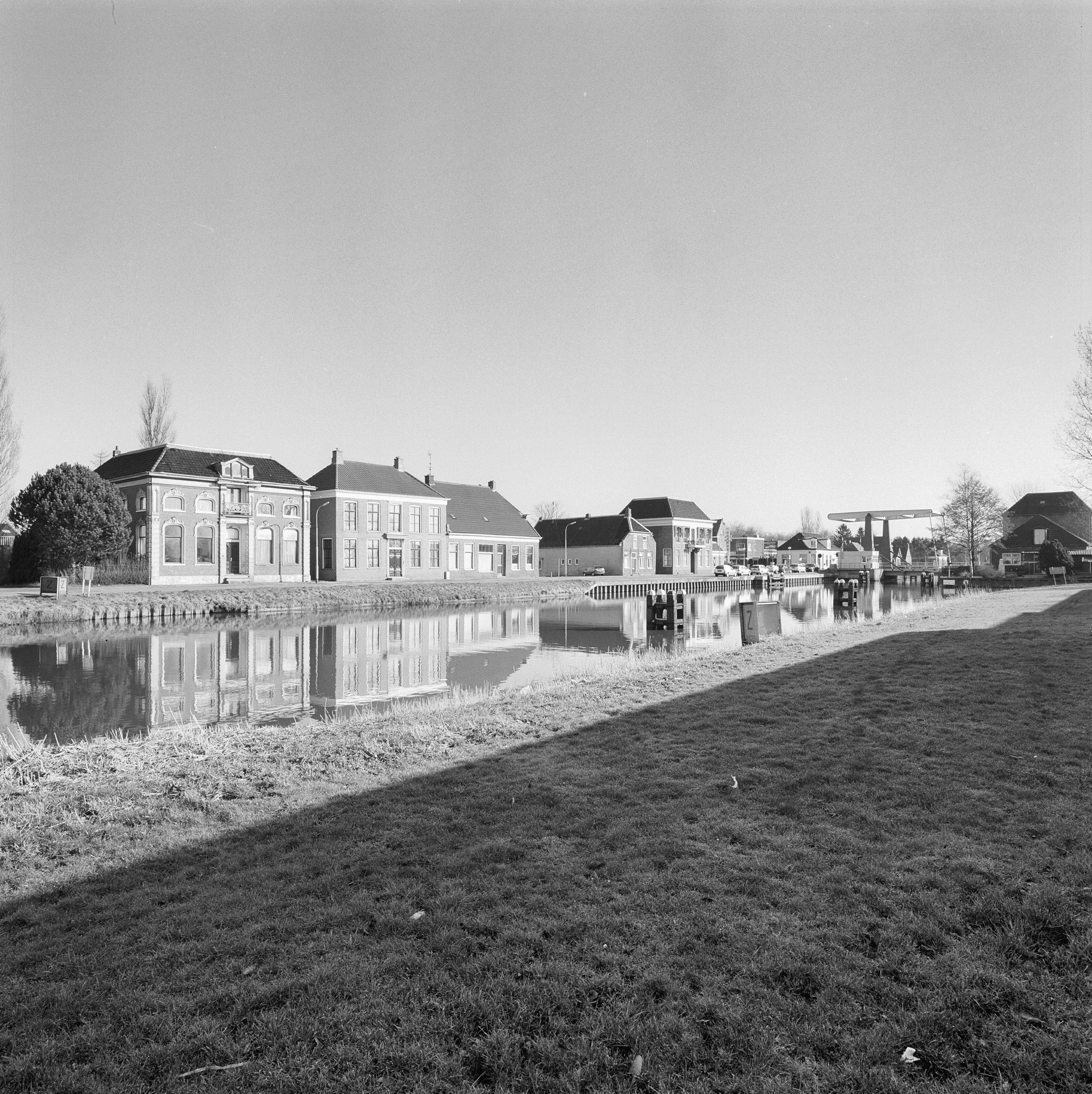
- Zuidbroek in 2003

- Location in the province of Groningen in the Netherlands
- Coordinates: 53°09′45″N 06°51′38″E
- Country: Netherlands
- Province: Groningen
- Municipality: Midden-Groningen

Area
  - Total: 17.28 km^{2} (6.67 sq mi)
- Elevation: 1.1 m (3.6 ft)

Population (2021)
  - Total: 3,575
  - Density: 206.9/km^{2} (535.8/sq mi)
- Time zone: UTC+1 (CET)
  - Summer (DST): UTC+2 (CEST)
- Postal code: 9636
- Dialing code: 0598

Zuidbroek (Dutch pronunciation: [zœydˈbruk]; Gronings: Zuudbrouk [zy(d)ˈbrɑʊ̯k]) is a village in the Dutch province of Groningen. It is located in the municipality of Midden-Groningen, about 6 km north of Veendam.

== History ==
Zuidbroek was a separate municipality until 1965, when it became a part of Oosterbroek. Oosterbroek was merged with Meeden and Muntendam in 1990 and renamed to Menterwolde a year later.

In 2014, the Noord-Nederlands Trein & Tram Museum at the Zuidbroek railway station was opened.

== Infrastructure ==
The Zuidbroek railway station is situated on the Harlingen–Nieuweschans railway and Stadskanaal–Zuidbroek railway.

== Gallery ==
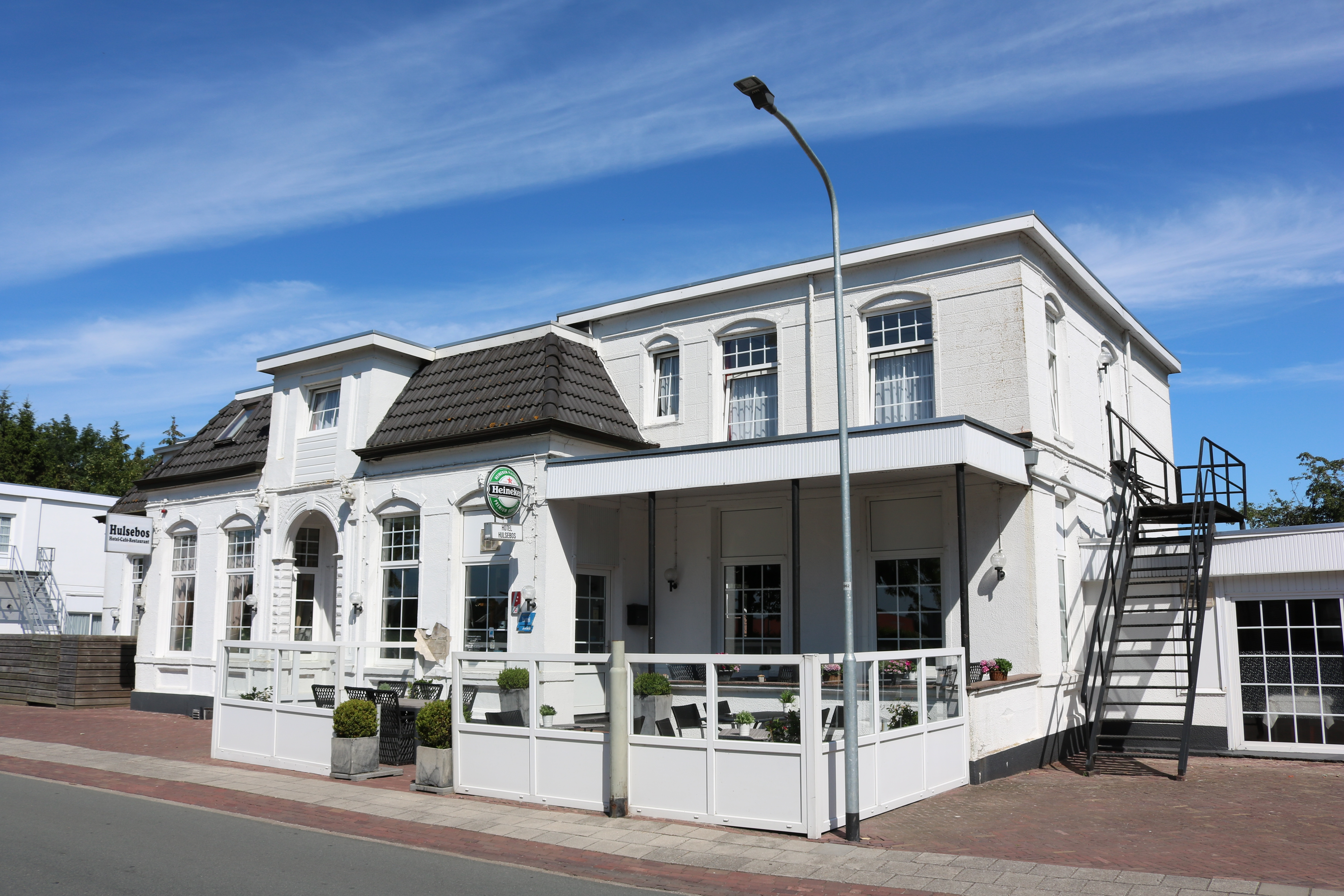
Coffeeshop of the railway station

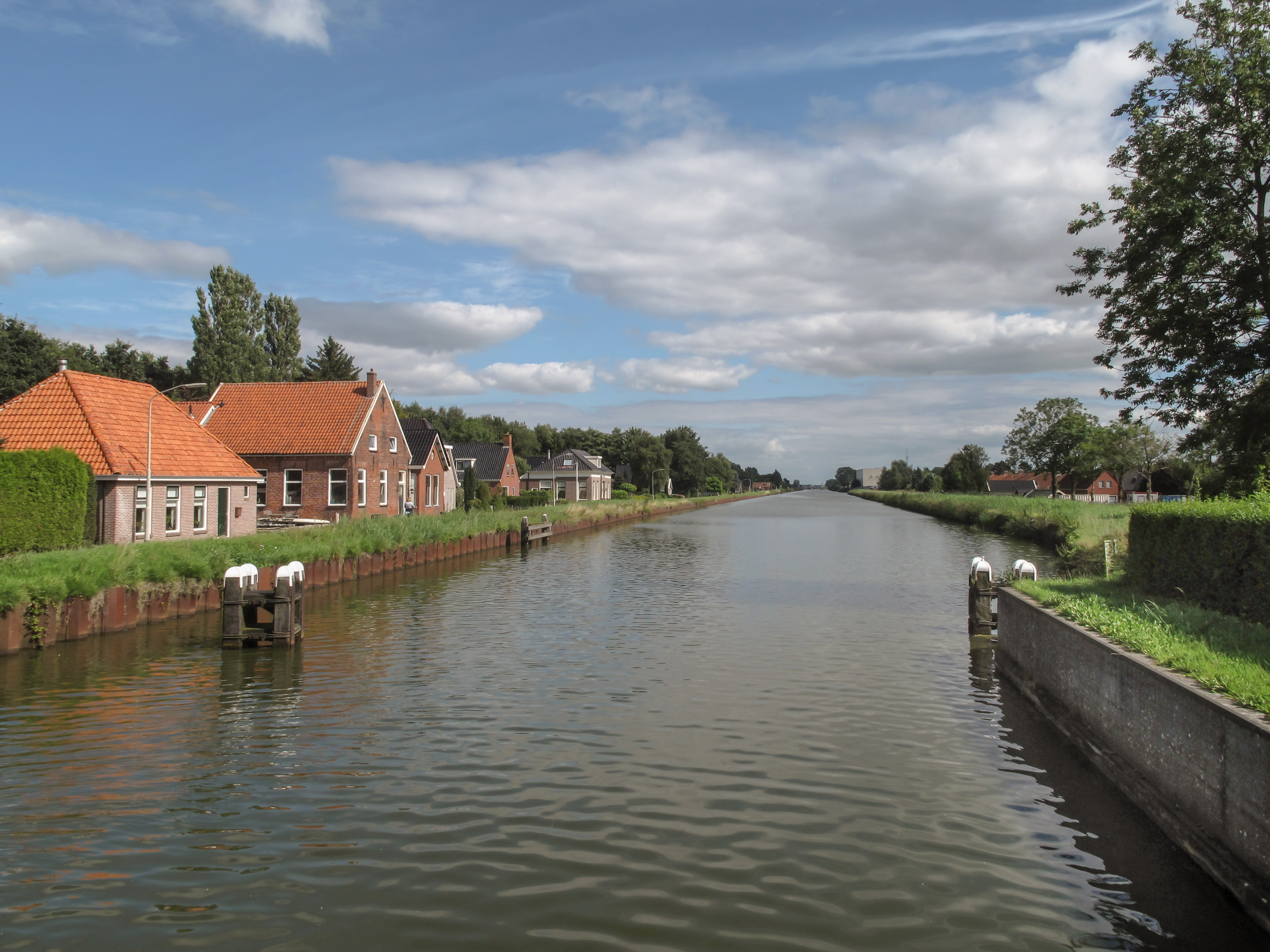
Canal view

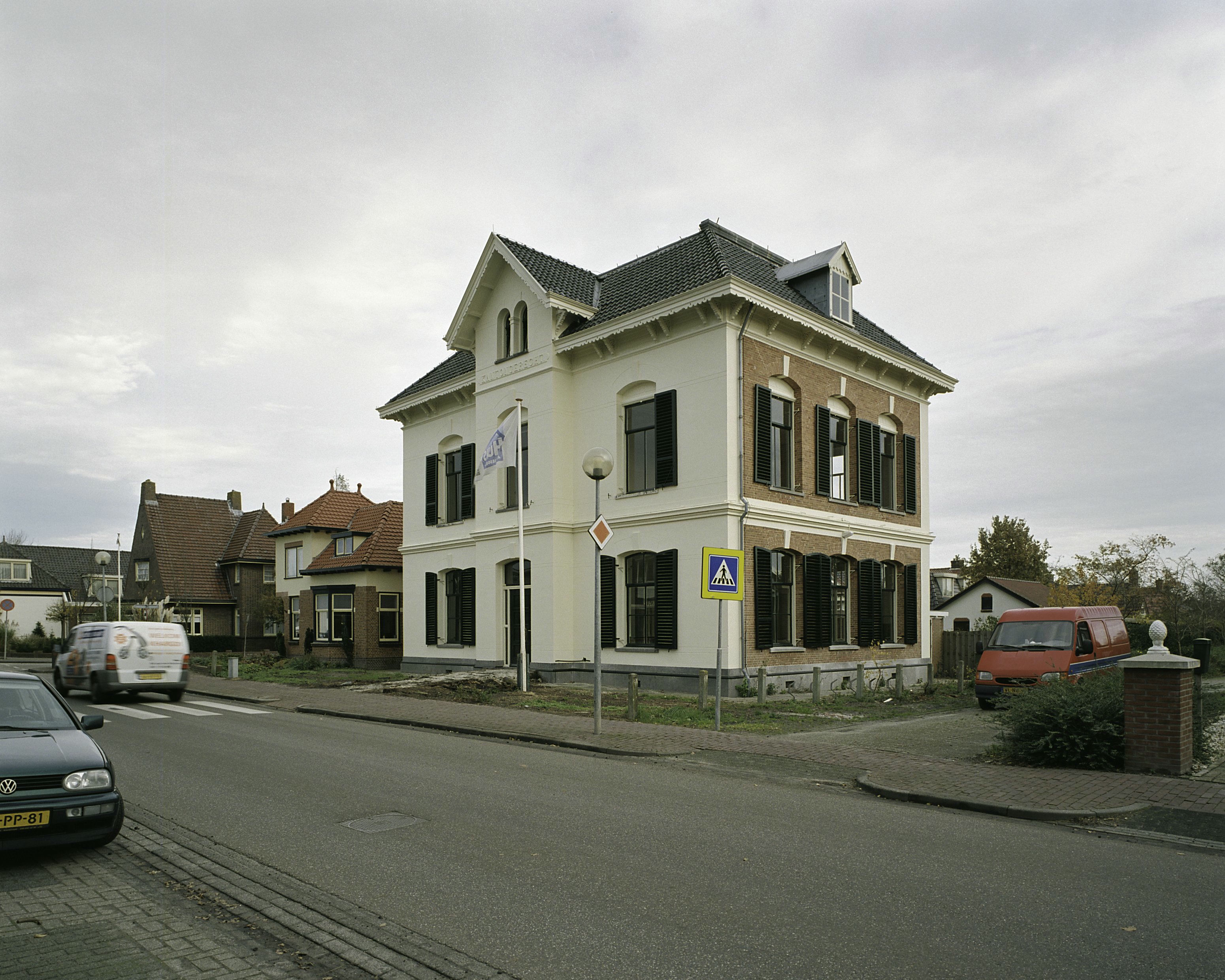
Former court house

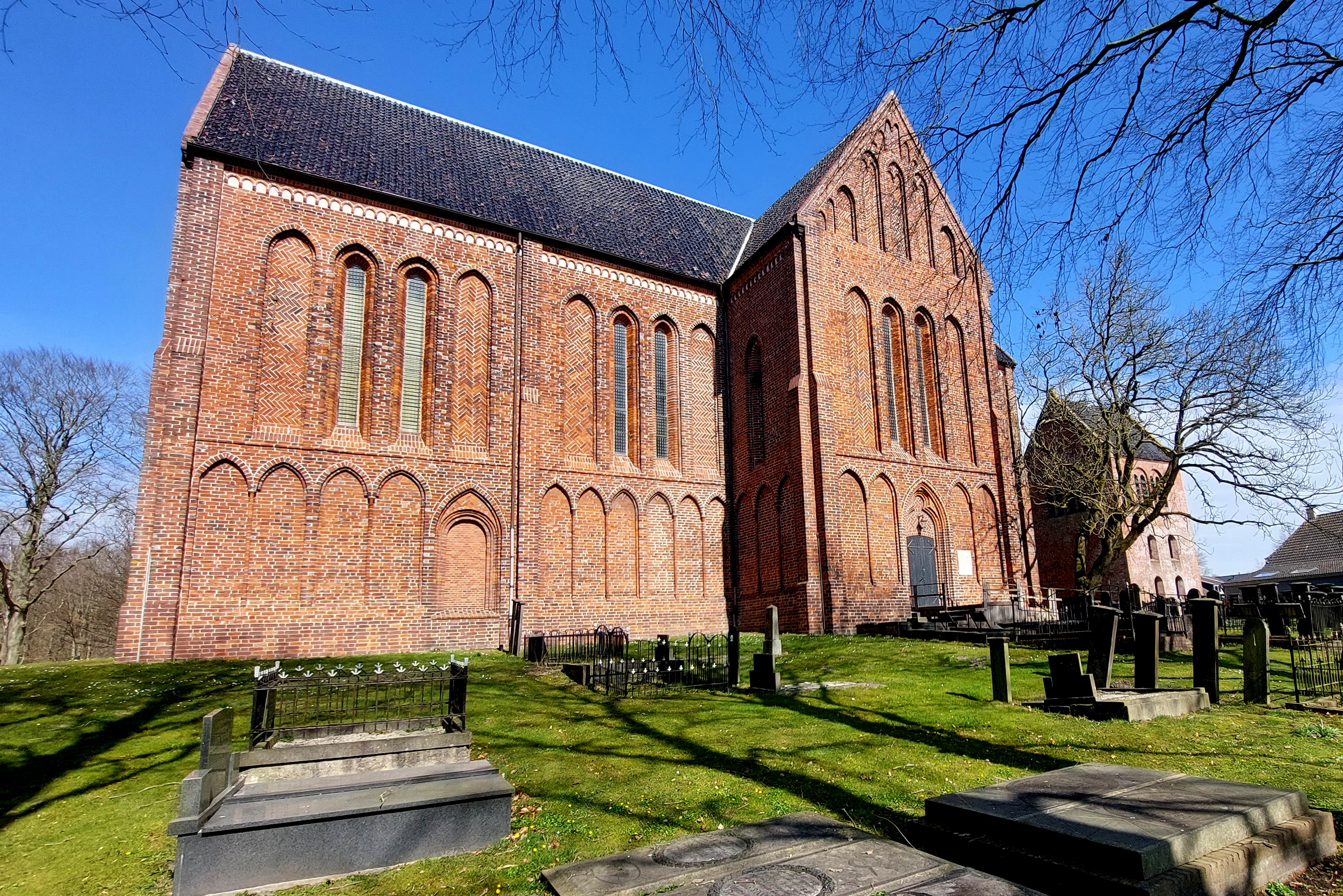
Dutch Reformed church
