= Menterwolde =

- Former municipality
- Location in Groningen
- Coordinates: 53°8′N 6°52′E
- Country: Netherlands
- Province: Groningen
- Municipality: Midden-Groningen
- Established: 1 January 1990
- Ceased to exist: 1 January 2018

Area
  - Total: 81.62 km^{2} (31.51 sq mi)
  - Land: 80.33 km^{2} (31.02 sq mi)
  - Water: 1.29 km^{2} (0.50 sq mi)
- Elevation: 2 m (6.6 ft)

Population (January 2021)
  - Total: data missing
- Time zone: UTC+1 (CET)
  - Summer (DST): UTC+2 (CEST)
- Postcode: 9630–9639, 9649–9651
- Area code: 0598

Menterwolde (Dutch pronunciation: [ˌmɛntərˈʋɔldə]) is a former municipality in the province of Groningen in the Netherlands. On January 1, 2018, Menterwolde merged with Hoogezand-Sappemeer and Slochteren, forming the municipality Midden-Groningen.

== History ==
On 1 January 1990, the municipalities of Meeden, Muntendam, and Oosterbroek merged to form Menterwolde.

== Geography ==
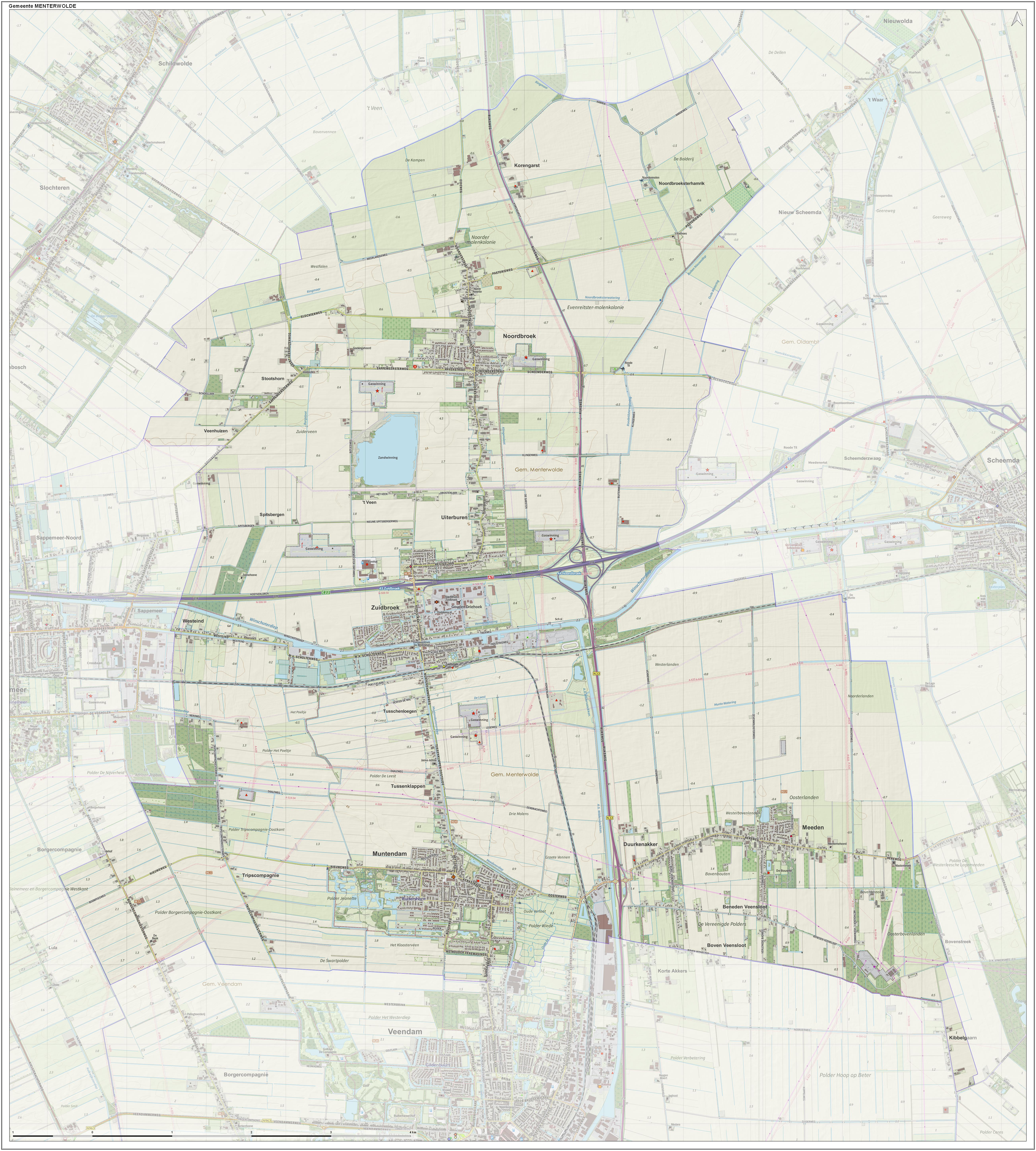
2015 map of Menterwolde

Menterwolde is located in the province of Groningen in the northeast of the Netherlands. It is situated in the west of the region of Oldambt.

Menterwolde is bordered by the municipalities of Slochteren in the northwest and north, Oldambt in the east, Pekela in the southeast, Veendam in the south, and Hoogezand-Sappemeer in the southwest and west.

The population centres in Menterwolde are the villages of Borgercompagnie, Meeden, Muntendam, Noordbroek, Tripscompagnie, and Zuidbroek.

The municipality has a total area of 81.62 km^{2} (31.51 sq mi) of which 80.33 km^{2} (31.02 sq mi) is land and 1.29 km^{2} (0.50 sq mi) is water.

== Transportation ==
The Zuidbroek railway station is located on the Harlingen–Nieuweschans railway and the Stadskanaal–Zuidbroek railway.
