= Meeden =

- Village
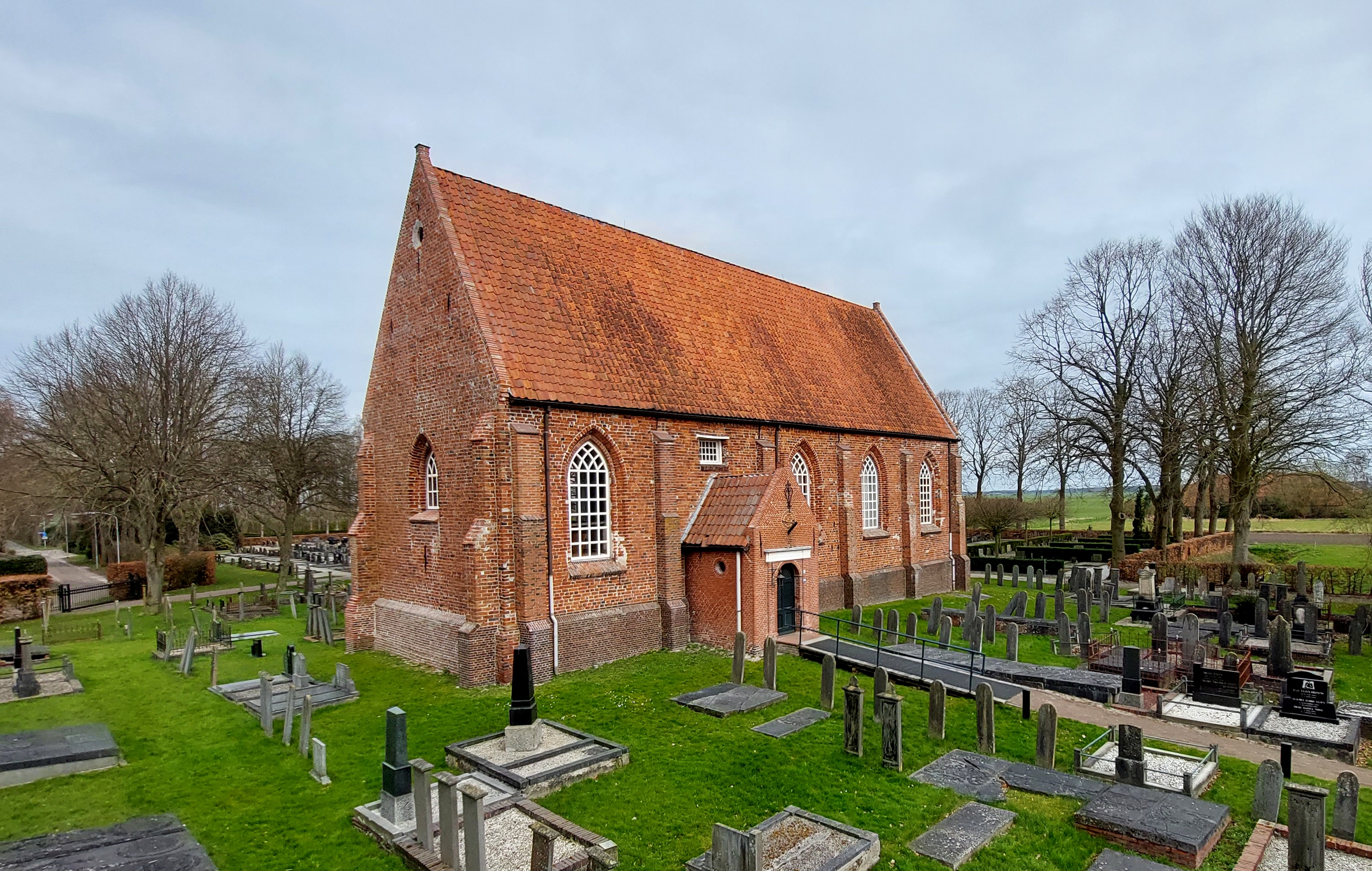
- Protestant Church

- Location of Meeden in the province of Groningen Meeden (Netherlands)
- Coordinates: 53°8′21″N 6°55′33″E
- Country: Netherlands
- Province: Groningen
- Municipality: Midden-Groningen

Area
  - Total: 17.93 km^{2} (6.92 sq mi)
- Elevation: 1.6 m (5.2 ft)

Population (2021)
  - Total: 1,705
  - Density: 95.09/km^{2} (246.3/sq mi)
- Time zone: UTC+1 (CET)
  - Summer (DST): UTC+2 (CEST)
- Postal code: 9651
- Dialing code: 0598

Meeden is a village in the municipality of Midden-Groningen in the province of Groningen, Netherlands.

== History ==
The village was first mentioned in 1391 as de Medum, which means "lower hay lands". Meeden is a road village that developed on the sandy ridge on the border with the Oldambt and the peat colonies. It was founded in the 11th century as a satellite of the former village of Eexta, but moved southwards during the 15th century.

The Dutch Reformed Church dates from around 1400 and has an attached tower that was built around 1500.

Meeden was home to 1,231 people in 1840. It was an independent municipality until the municipal restructuring in 1990, after which Meeden became a part of the municipality of Menterwolde. The village council objected to the move because they preferred to be merged with Veendam due to historical and geographic similarities. In 2019, Meeden became part of the municipality of Midden-Groningen.

== Gallery ==
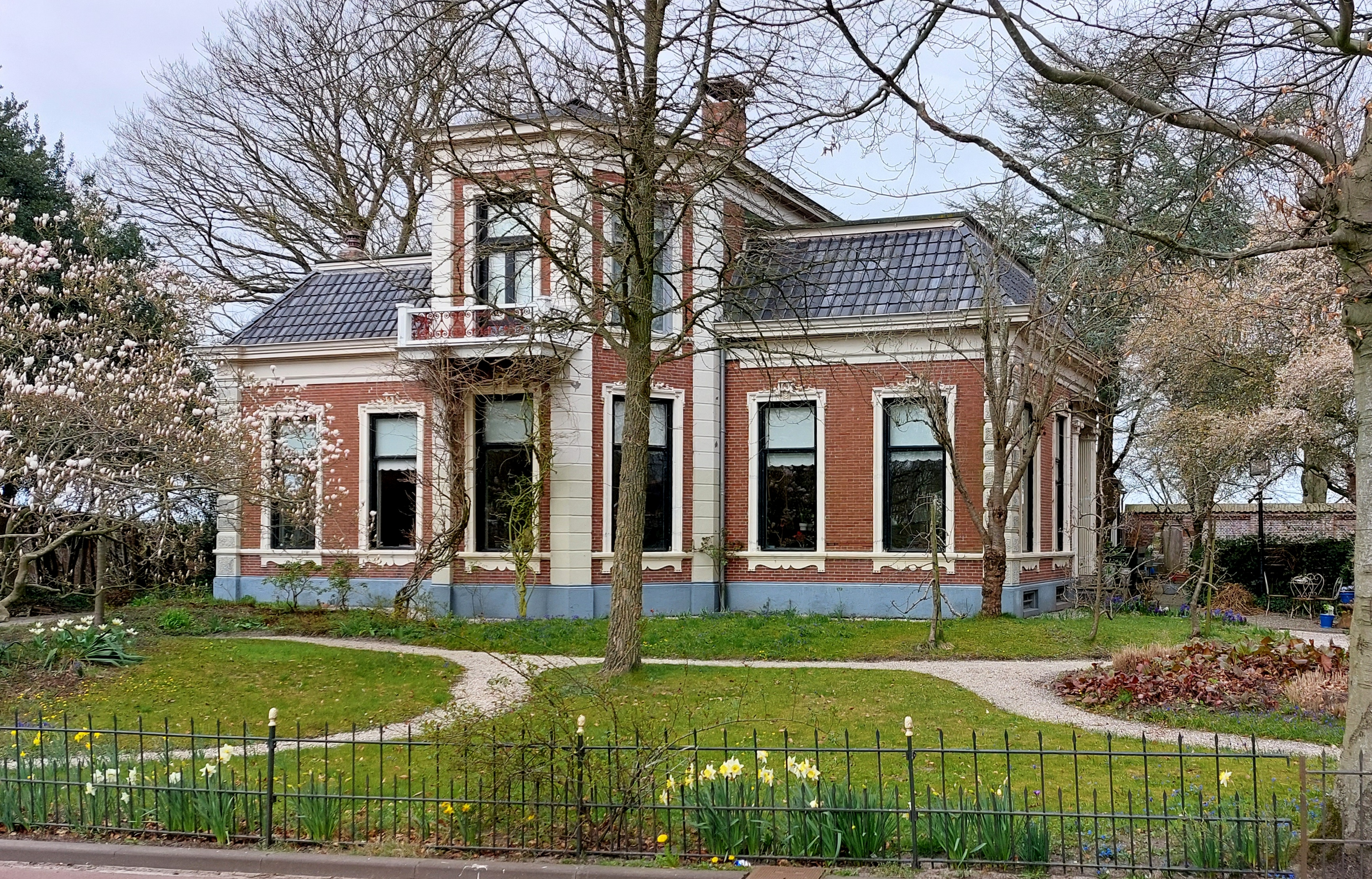
Villa in Meeden

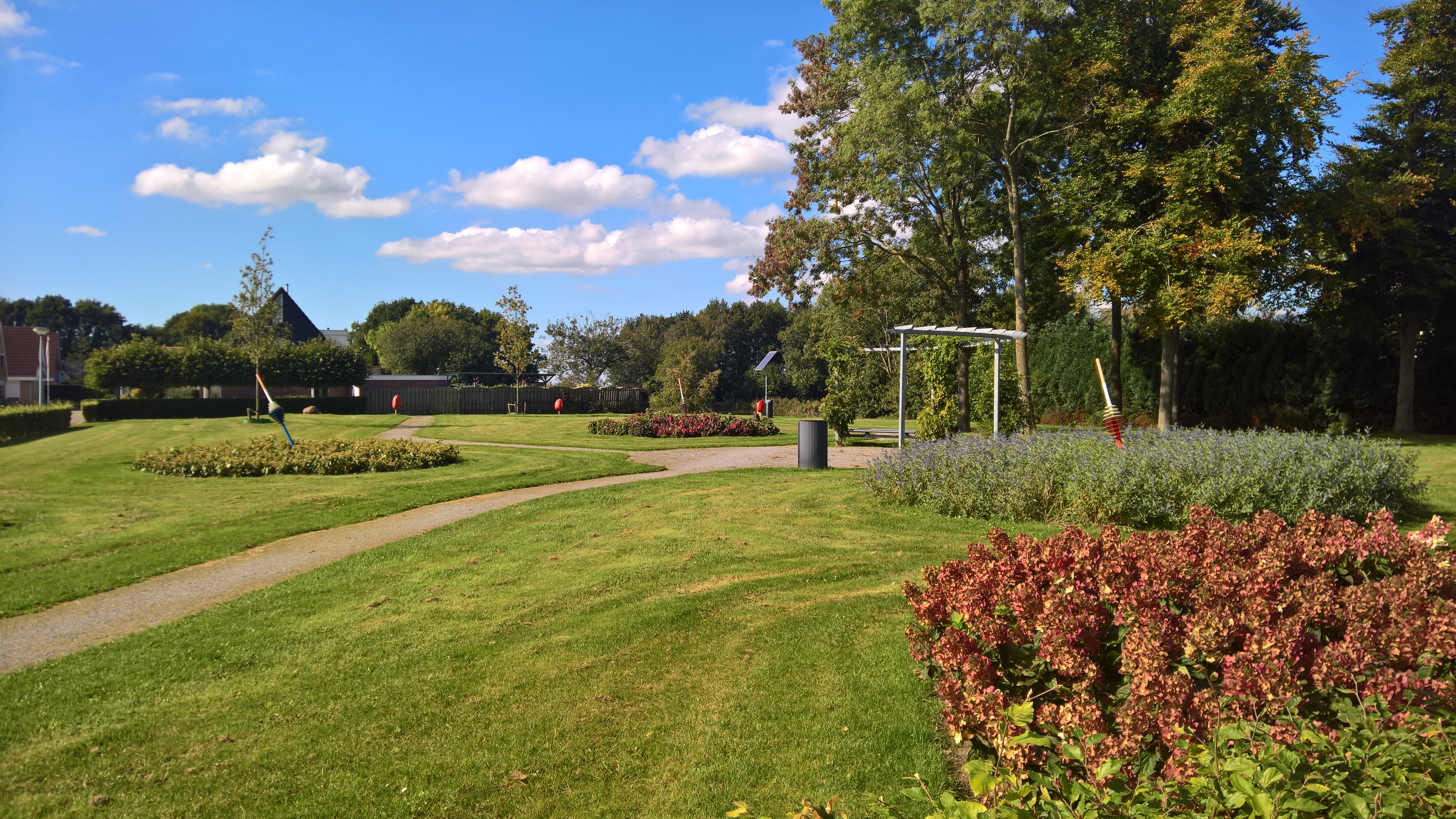
Park in Meeden

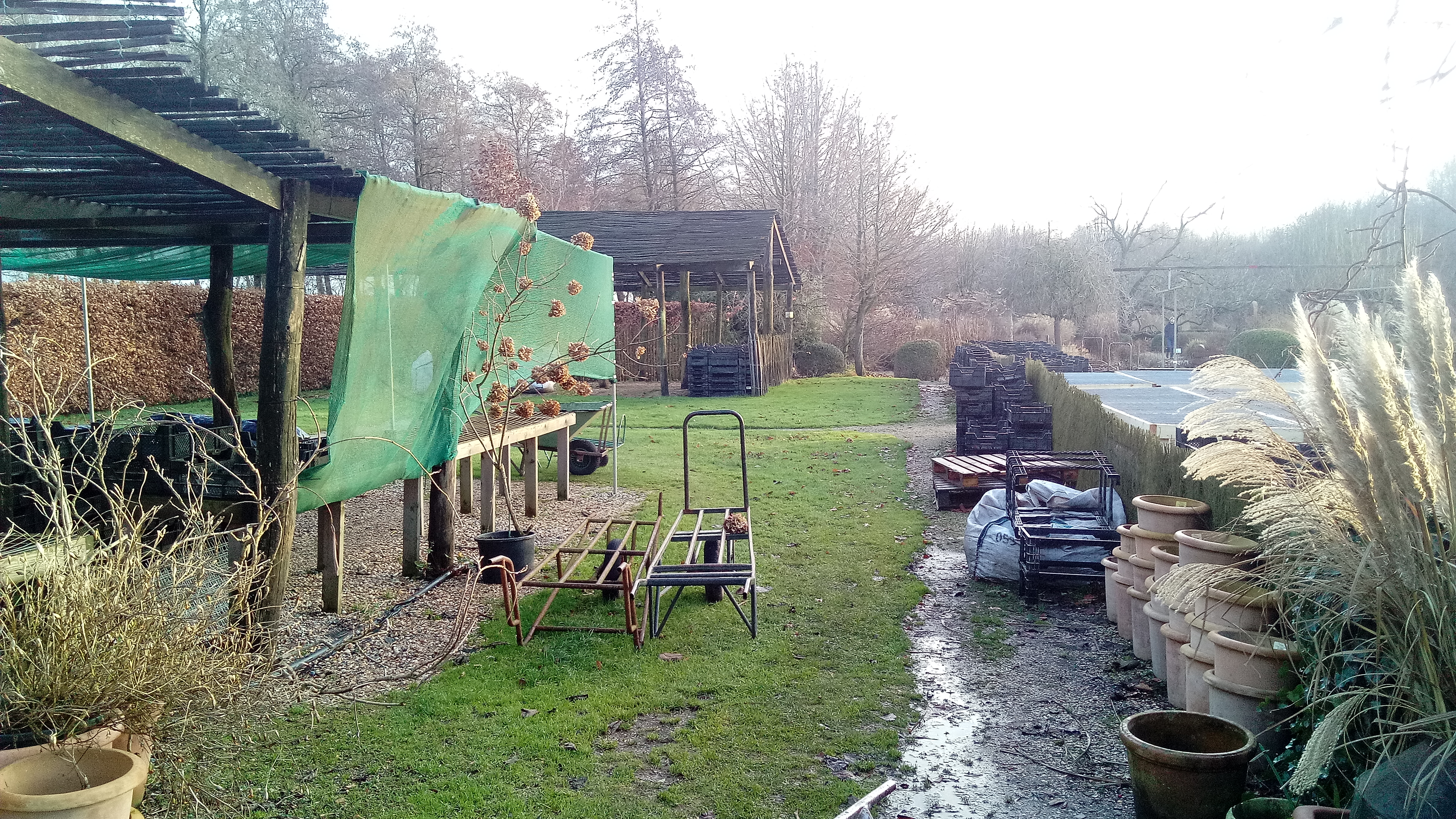
Small market

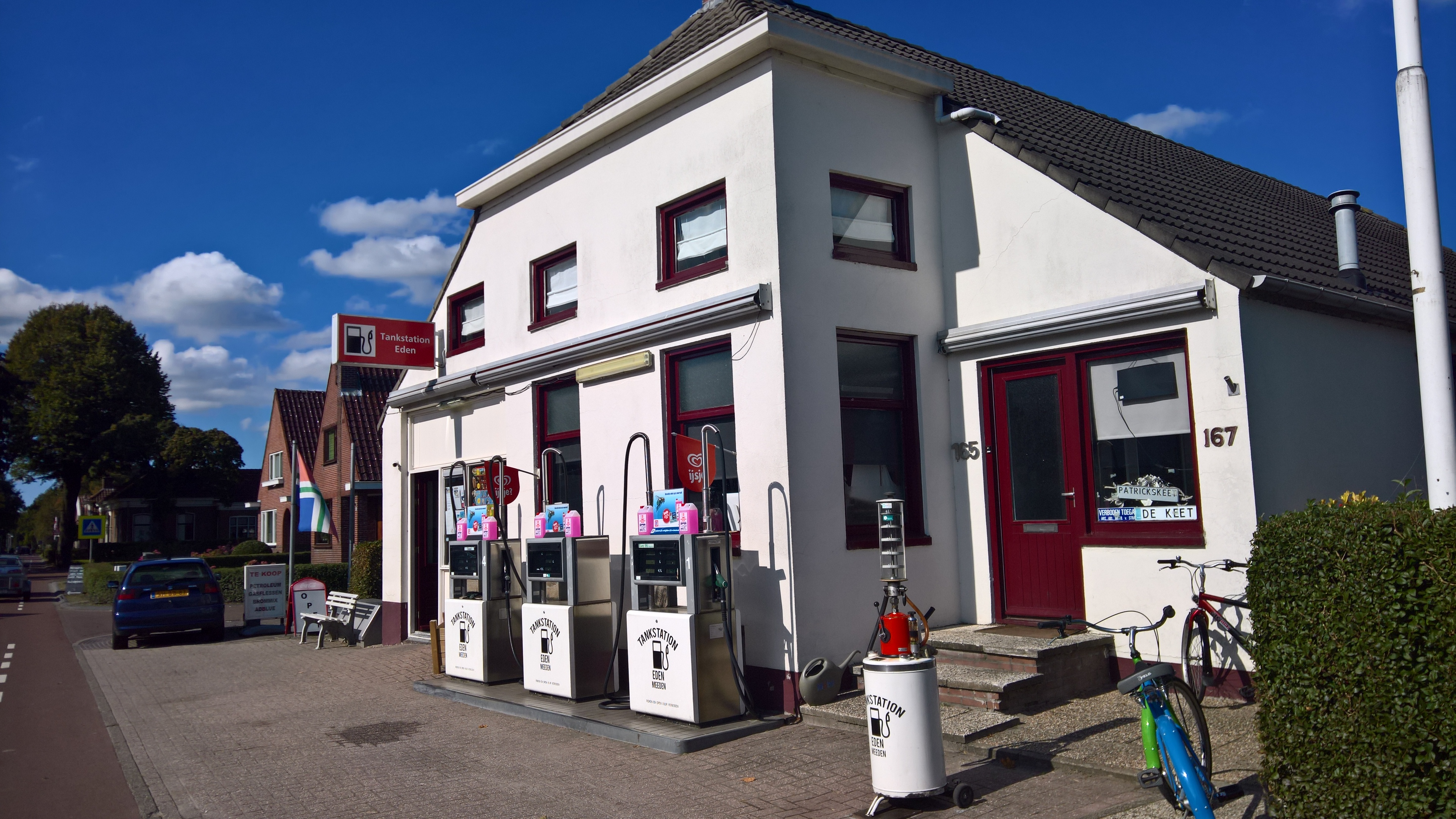
Gas station
