= Siddeburen =

- Village
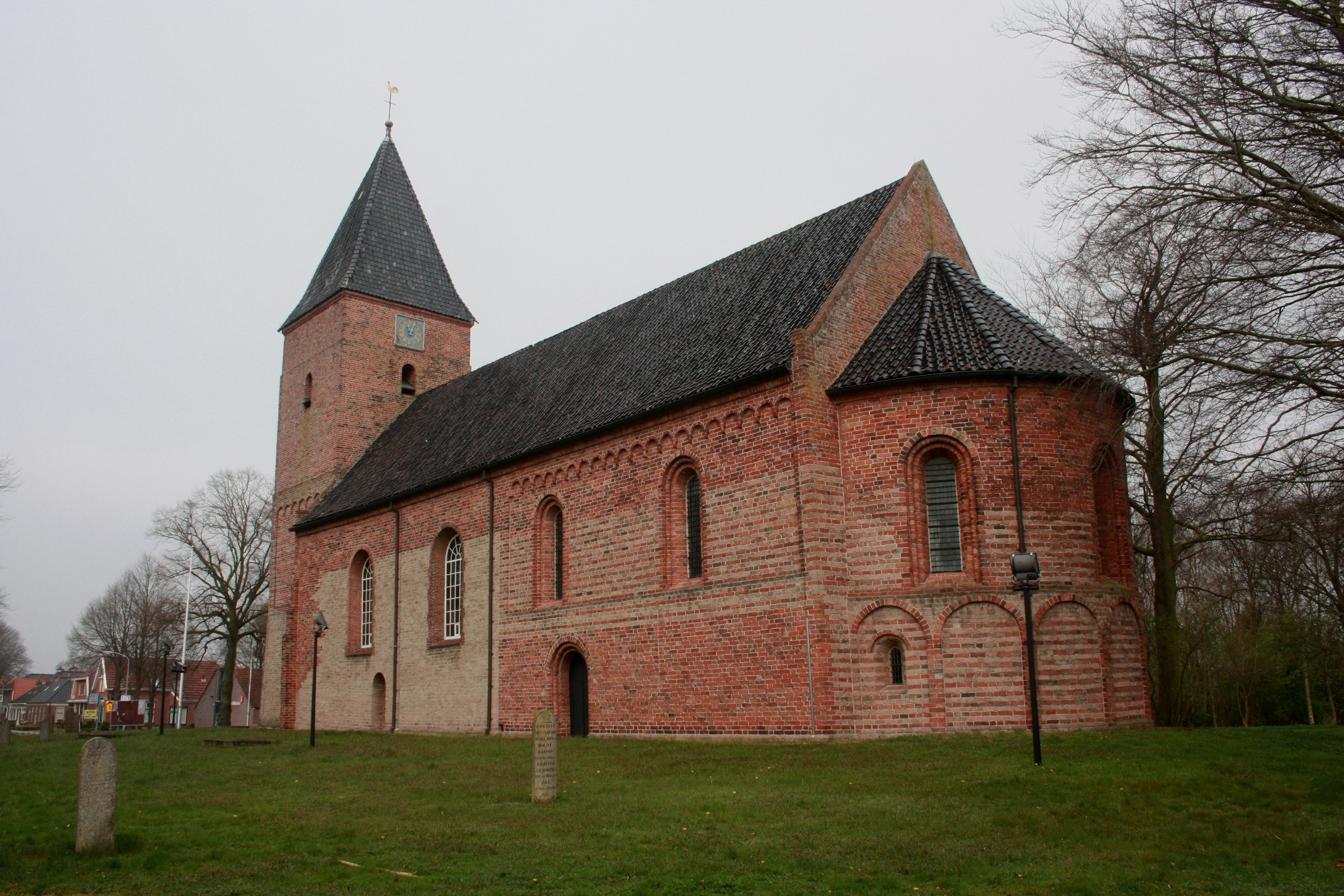
- Protestant Church in 2014

- Location of Siddeburen in the province of Groningen Siddeburen (Netherlands)
- Coordinates: 53°14′55″N 6°51′52″E
- Country: Netherlands
- Province: Groningen
- Municipality: Midden-Groningen

Area
  - Total: 22.04 km^{2} (8.51 sq mi)
- Elevation: 1.1 m (3.6 ft)

Population (2021)
  - Total: 3,205
  - Density: 145.4/km^{2} (376.6/sq mi)
- Time zone: UTC+1 (CET)
  - Summer (DST): UTC+2 (CEST)
- Postal code: 9628
- Dialing code: 0598

Siddeburen (Dutch: [ˌsɪdəˈbyːrə(n)]; Gronings: Sibboeren or Siddeboeren) is a village in the Dutch province of Groningen. It is located in the municipality of Midden-Groningen, about 10 km southwest of Delfzijl.

Siddeburen was a separate municipality until 1826, when it was merged with Slochteren.

== History ==
The village was first mentioned in 1226 as "de Sigerdachurke", and means "settlement of Syerd (person)". Siddeburen is a road village which developed on a sandy ridge in the late 12th century. The village originally consisted of two parallel linear settlements.

The Dutch Reformed church dates from around 1200. The tower was enlarged several times, but partially rebuilt and lowered in 1832. The church was restored in the mid-20th century.

Siddeburen was home to 1,335 people in 1840.
