= Hellum =

- Village
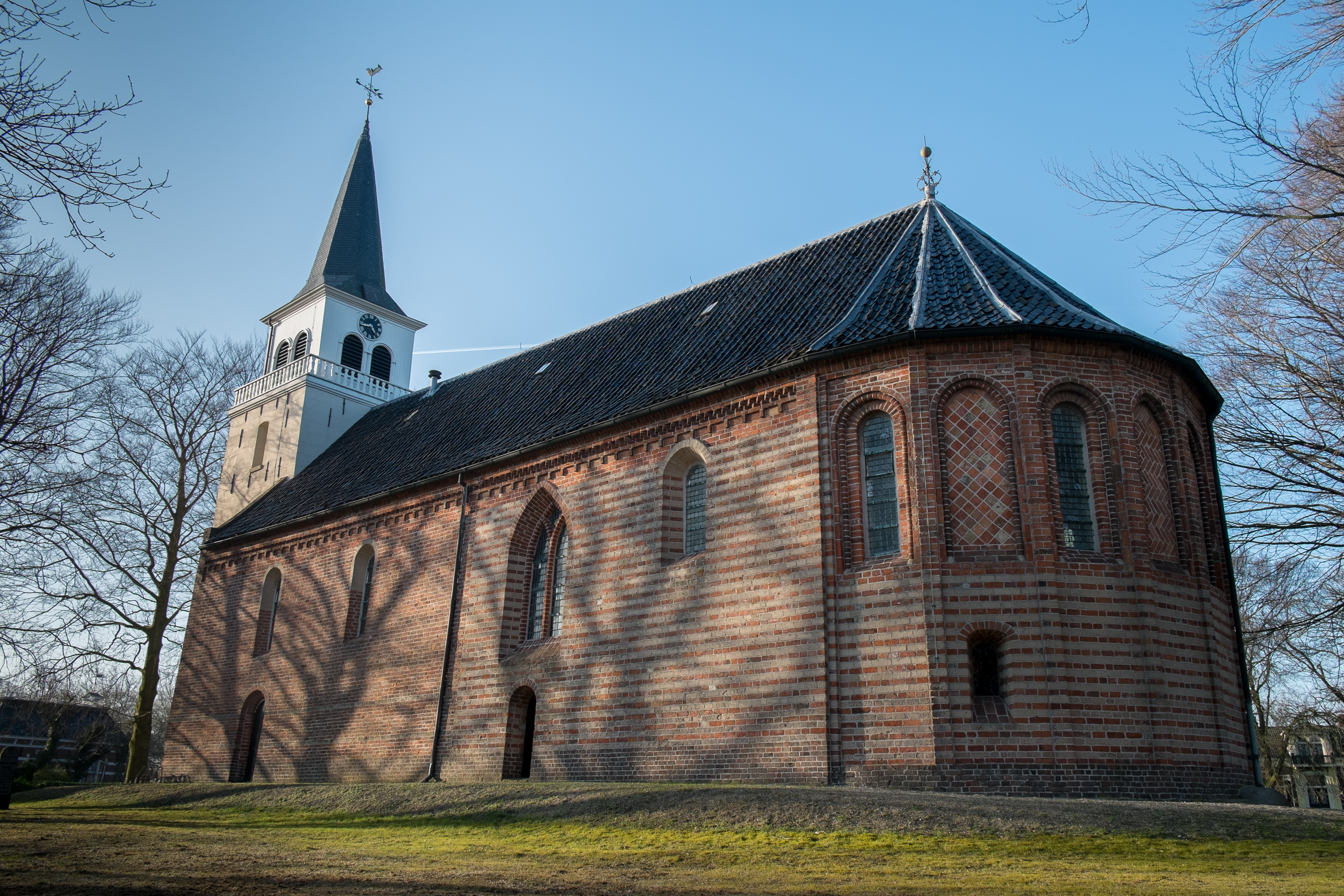
- Church of Hellum in 2014

- Flag

- Location of Hellum in the province of Groningen Hellum (Netherlands)
- Coordinates: 53°14′18″N 6°50′18″E
- Country: Netherlands
- Province: Groningen
- Municipality: Midden-Groningen

Area
  - Total: 6.21 km^{2} (2.40 sq mi)
- Elevation: 0.4 m (1.3 ft)

Population (2021)
  - Total: 545
  - Density: 87.8/km^{2} (227/sq mi)
- Time zone: UTC+1 (CET)
  - Summer (DST): UTC+2 (CEST)
- Postal code: 9672
- Dialing code: 0597

Hellum (Gronings: Helm) is a village in the municipality of Midden-Groningen, the Netherlands.

== History ==
The village was first mentioned in 1282 as de Hellum. The etymology is unclear. Hellum is a road village which developed in the 12th century on a sandy ridge.

The church was built in the 13th century as a reconstruction of a church from around 1100. The tower dates from the Middle Ages, however the top has been rebuilt in 1648.

Hellum was home to 693 people in 1840. It used to be part of the municipality of Slochteren. In 2018, it became part of the municipality of Midden-Groningen.

== Gallery ==
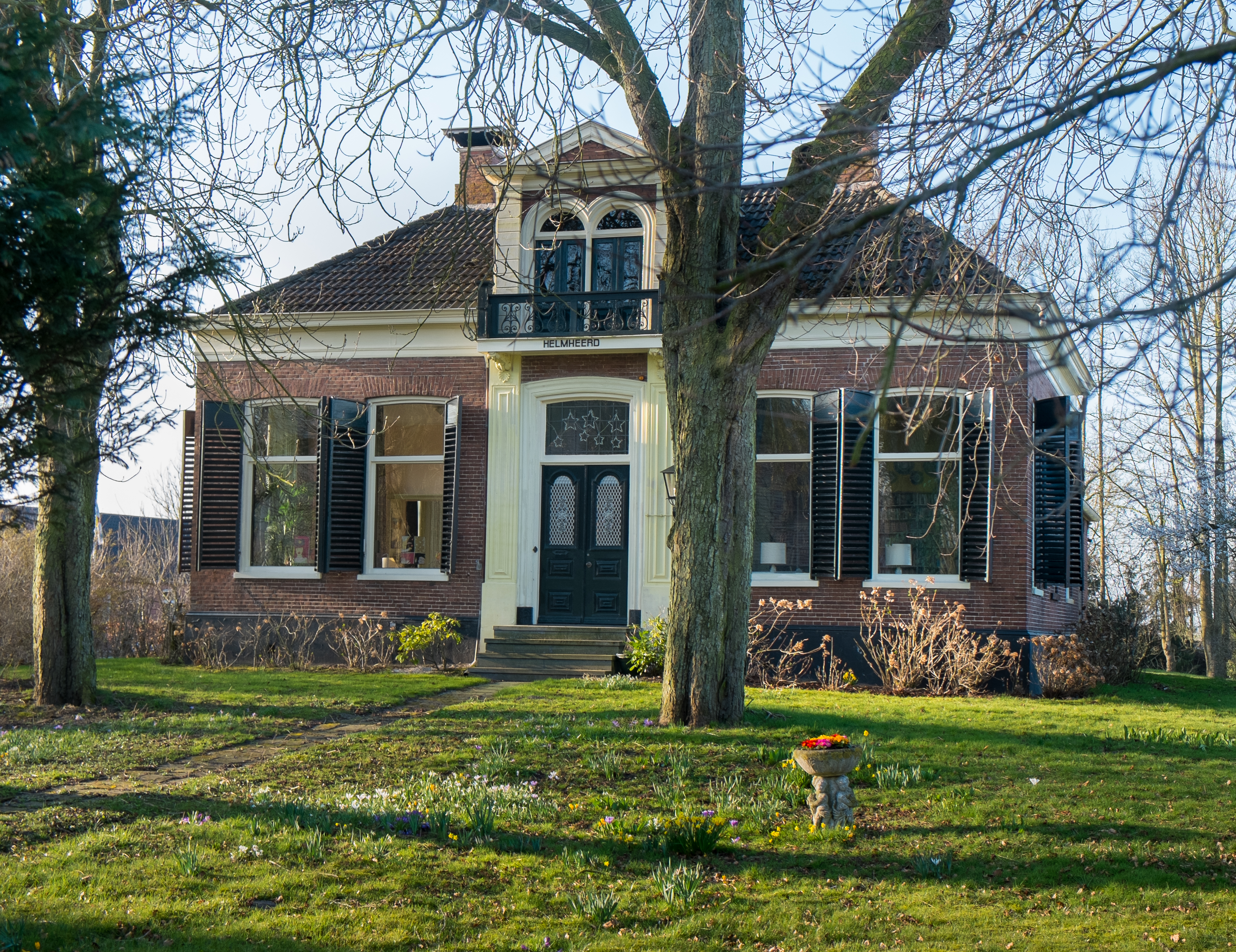
Helmheerd

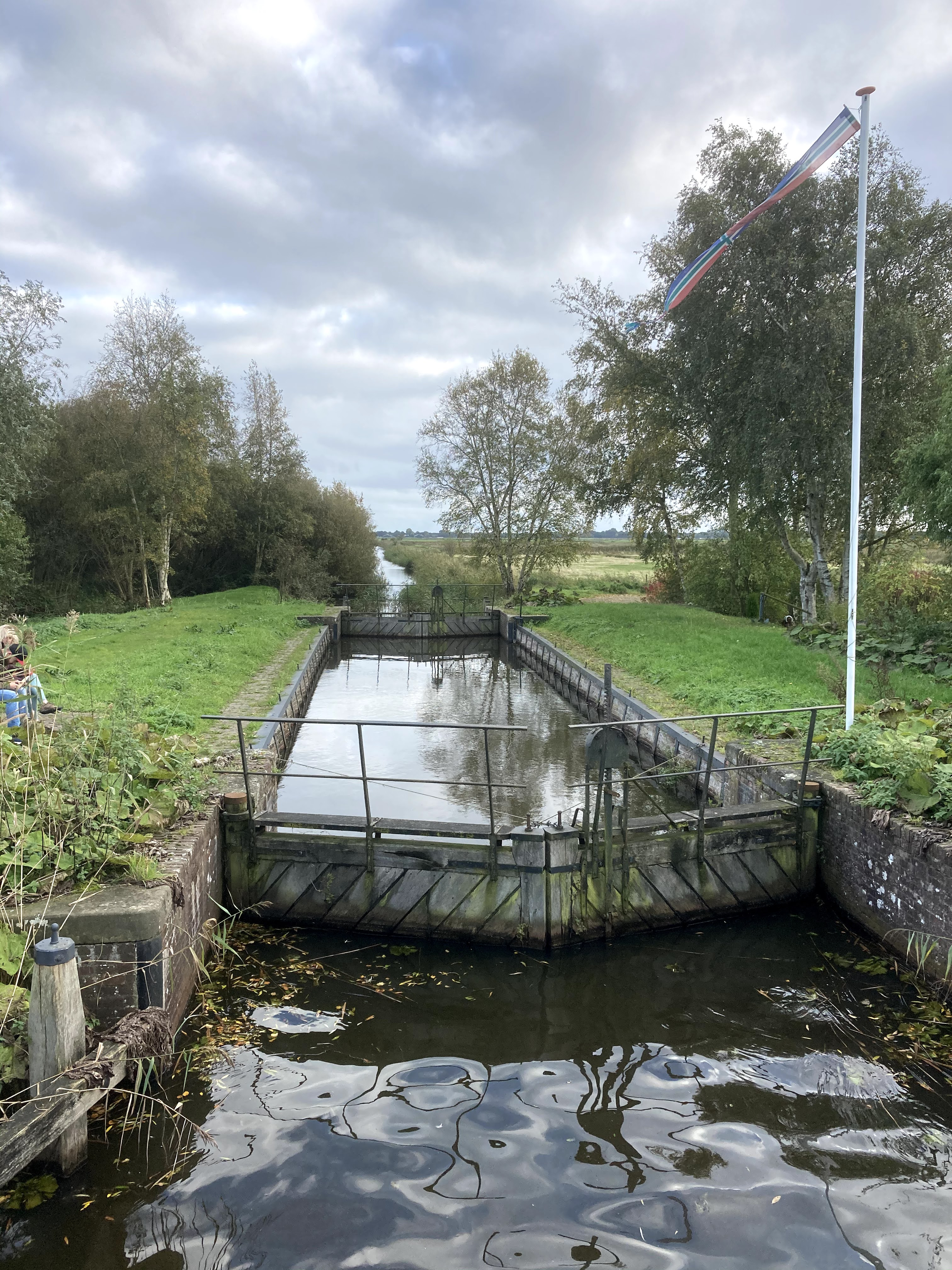
Sluice
