= Midden-Groningen =

- Municipality
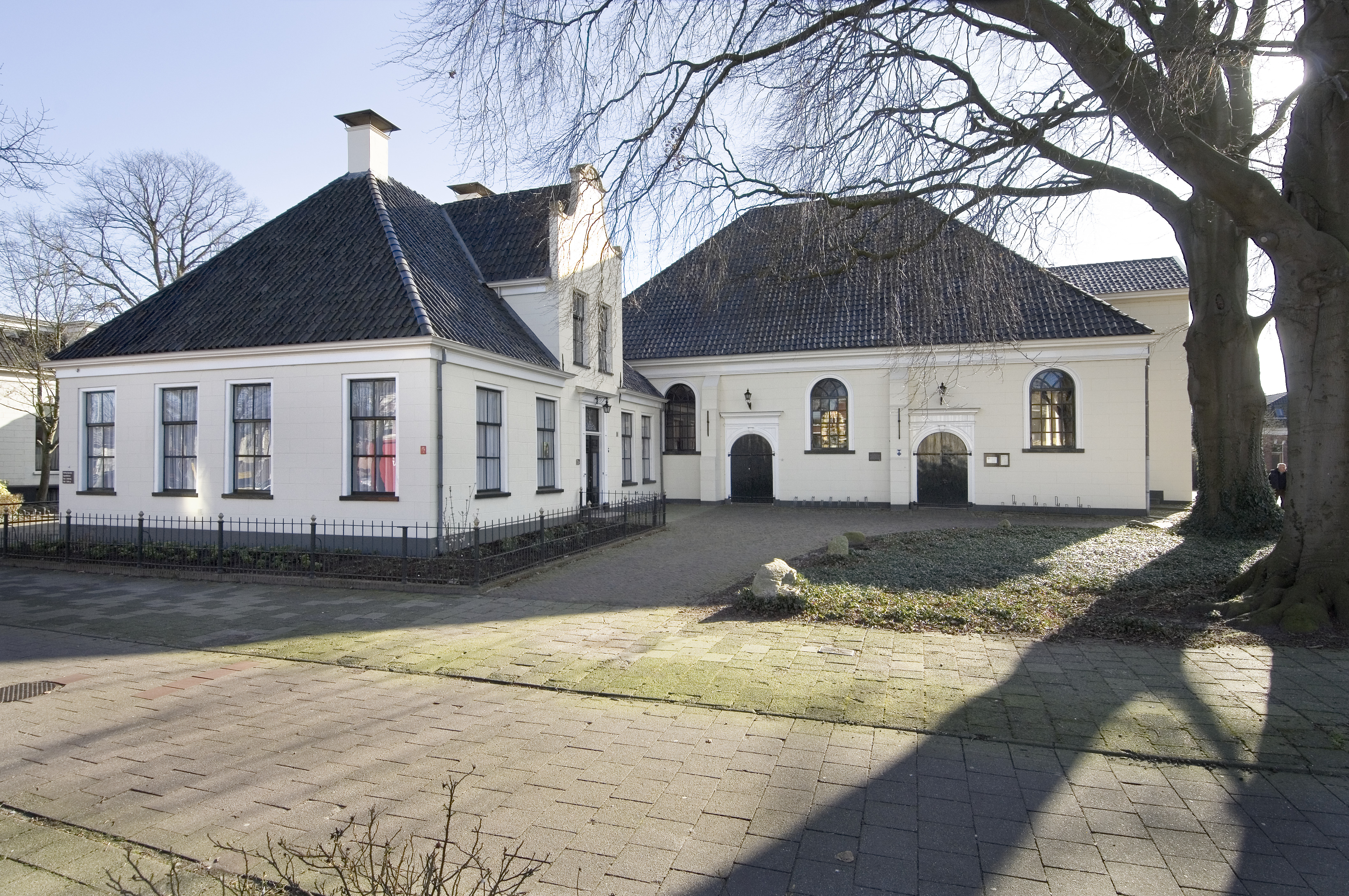
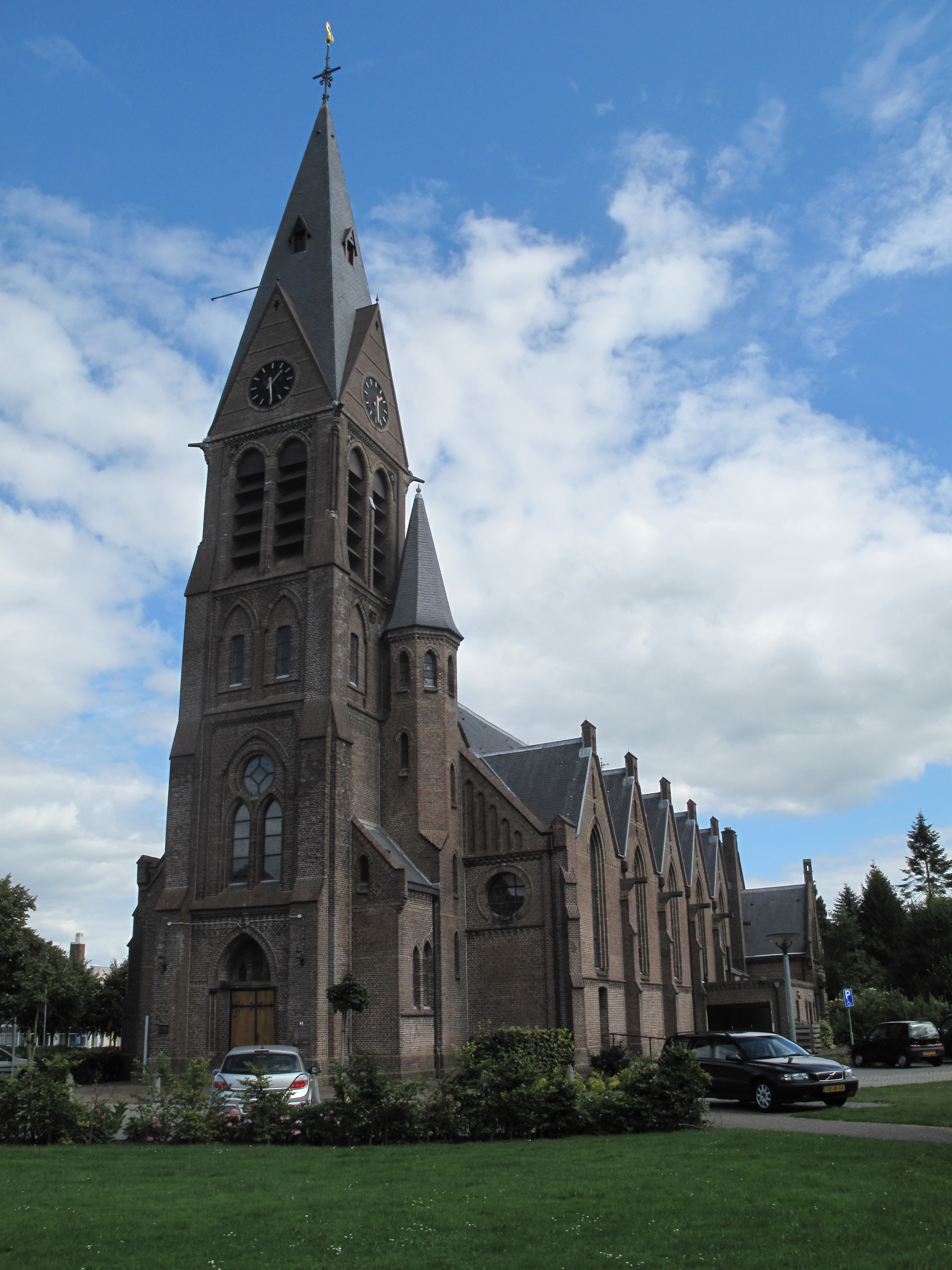
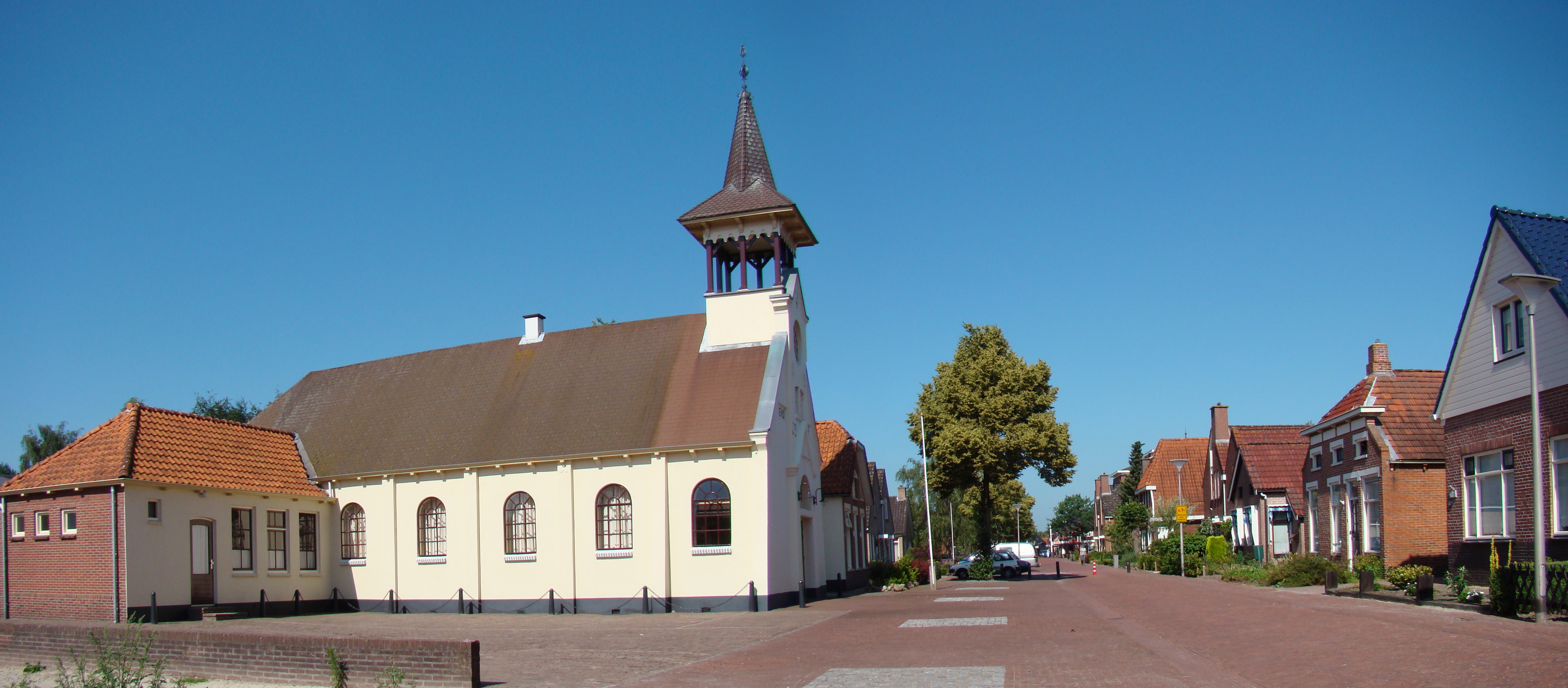
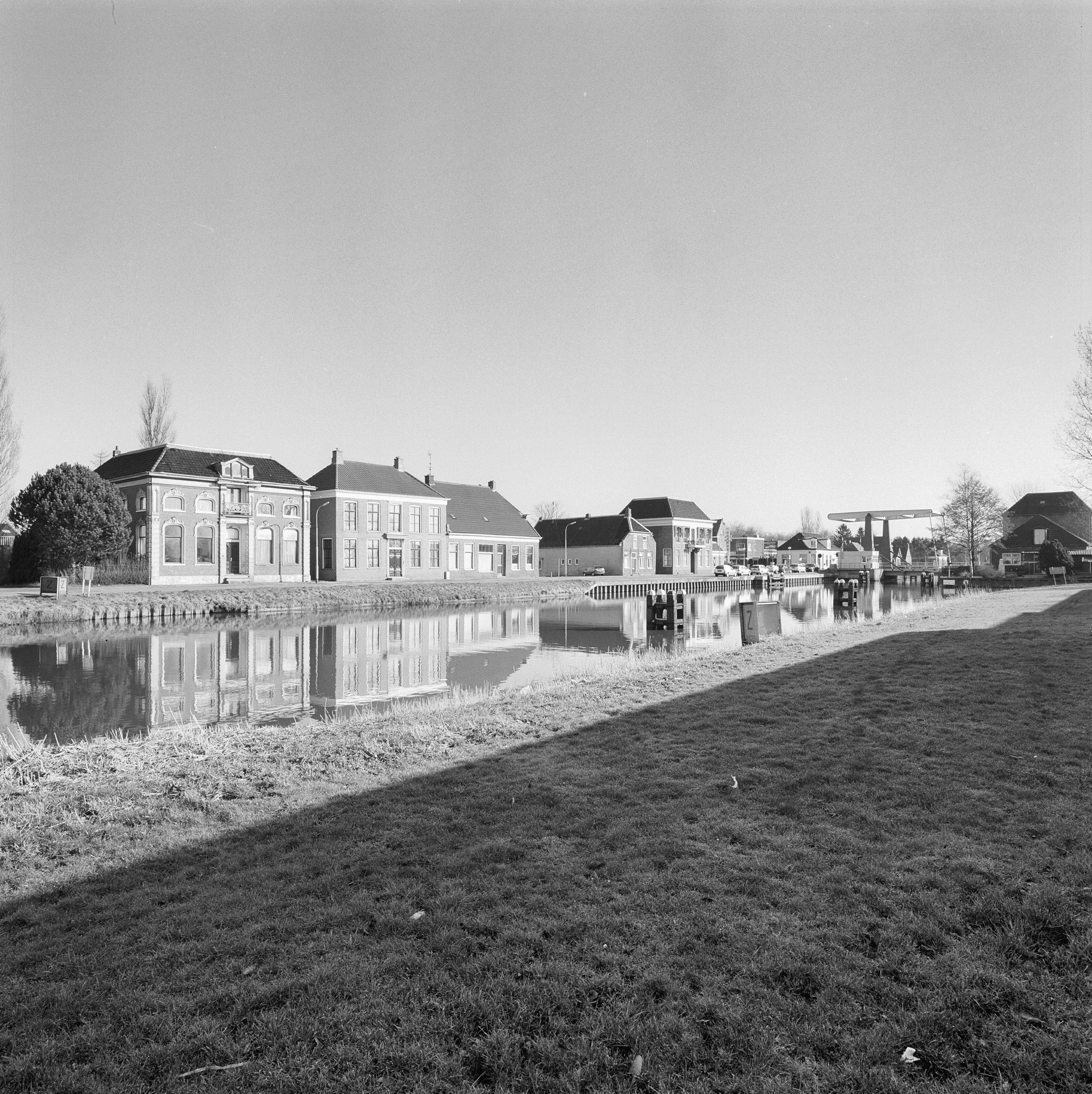
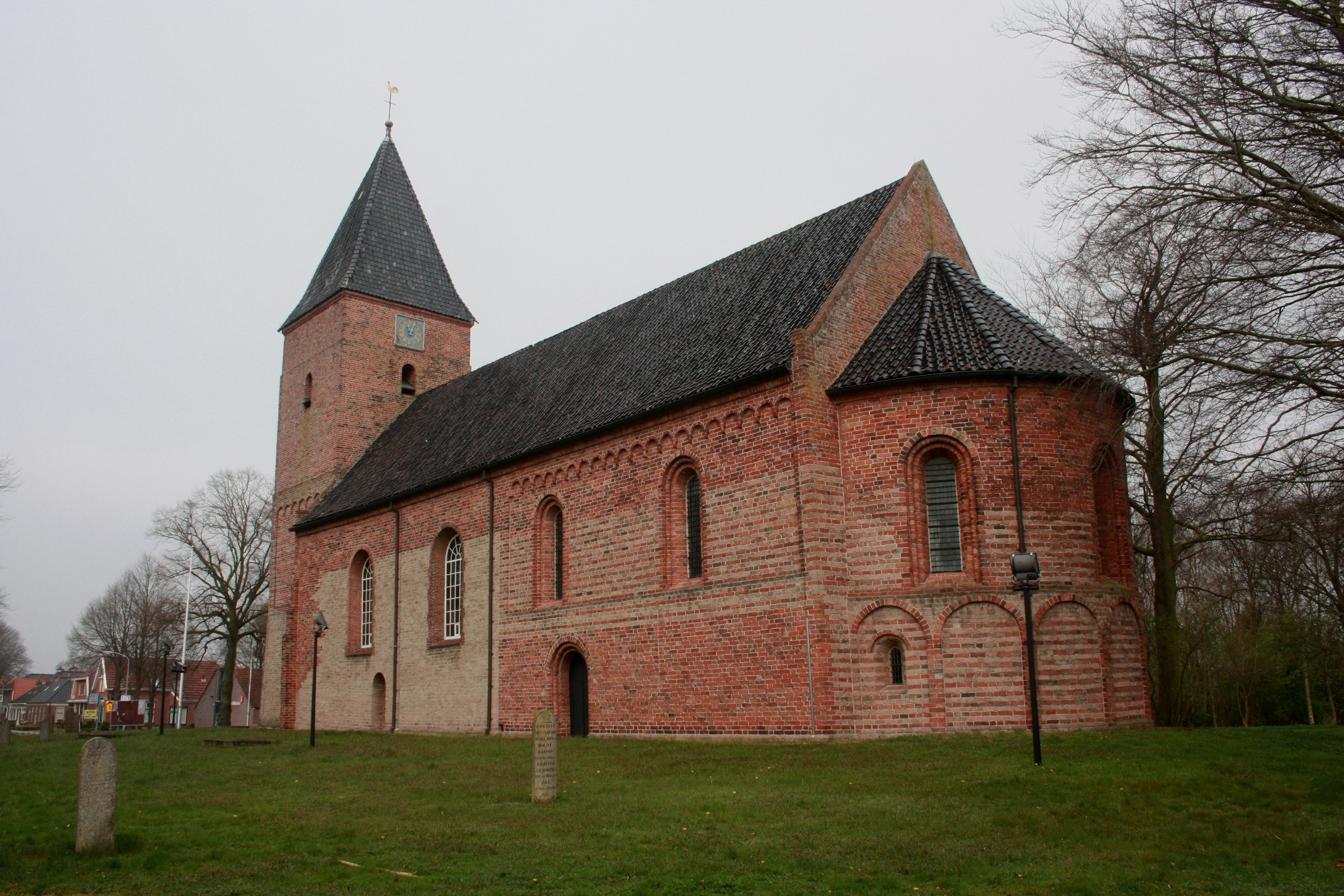
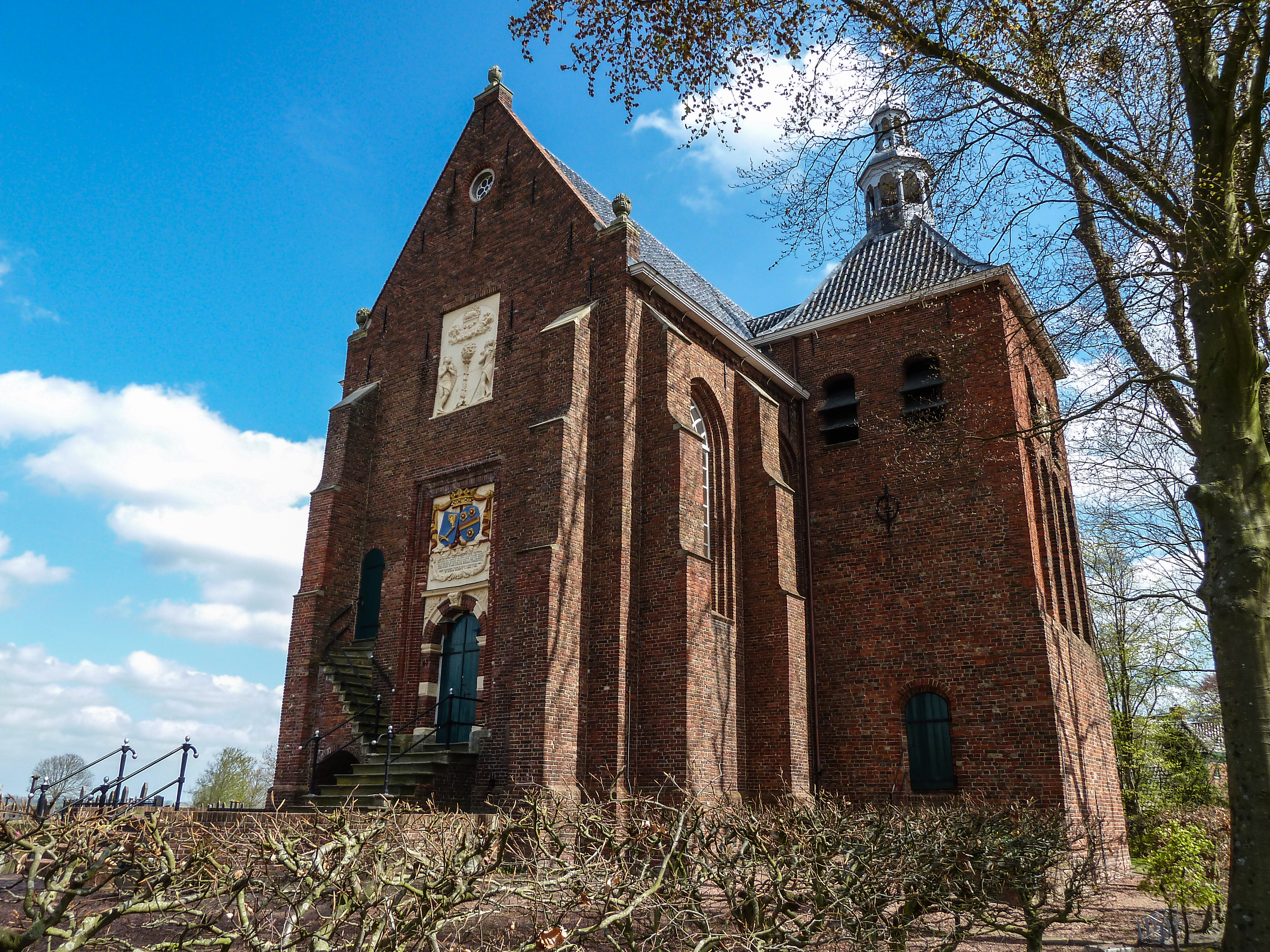
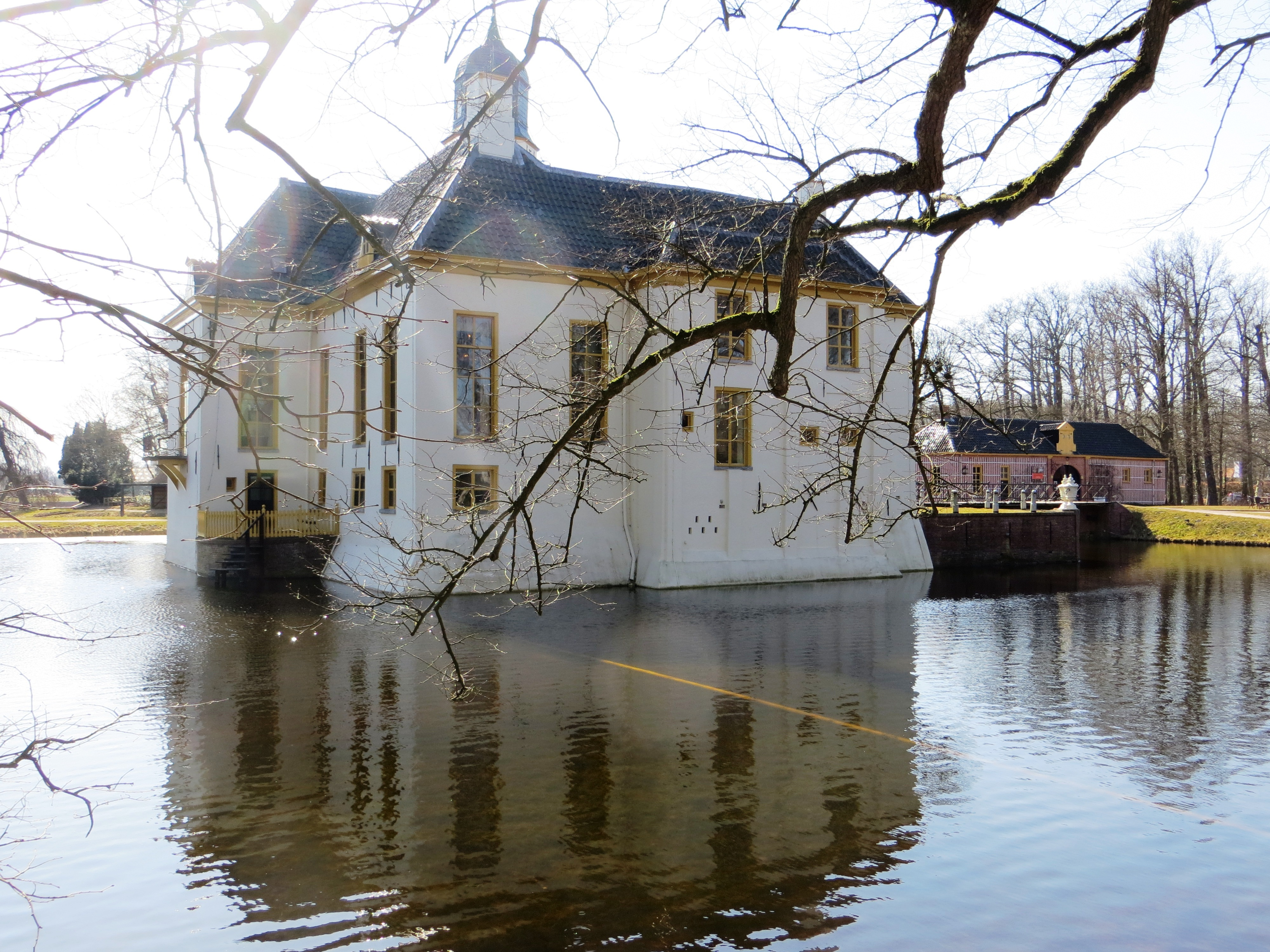
- Hoogezand Sappemeer Muntendam Zuidbroek Siddeburen Harkstede Slochteren

- Coat of arms Logo

- Location in Groningen
- Coordinates: 53°11′4.999″N 6°48′40.000″E
- Country: Netherlands
- Province: Groningen

Government
  - Body: Municipal council
  - Mayor: Erica van Lente (PvdA)

Population (January 2018)
  - Total: 60,953
- Time zone: UTC+1 (CET)
  - Summer (DST): UTC+2 (CEST)
- Website: www.midden-groningen.nl

Midden-Groningen (Gronings: Midden-Grunnen) is a municipality with a population of 60,953 in the province of Groningen, Netherlands. The municipality was formed by the merger of former municipalities of Hoogezand-Sappemeer, Slochteren and Menterwolde on 1 January 2018 in the context of the municipal redivision in the province of Groningen 2013–2018.

The municipality consists of the following villages and hamlets: Borgercompagnie, Foxhol, Froombosch, Harkstede, Hellum, Hoogezand, Kiel-Windeweer, Kolham, Kropswolde, Luddeweer, Martenshoek, Meeden, Muntendam, Noordbroek, Overschild, Sappemeer, Scharmer, Schildwolde, Siddeburen, Slochteren, Steendam, Tjuchem, Tripscompagnie, Waterhuizen, Westerbroek, Woudbloem, Zuidbroek.

The neighbourhood of Meerstad, which belonged to the former municipality of Slochteren, was added to the municipality of Groningen on 1 January 2017 and therefore did not participate in the merger.

== Naming ==
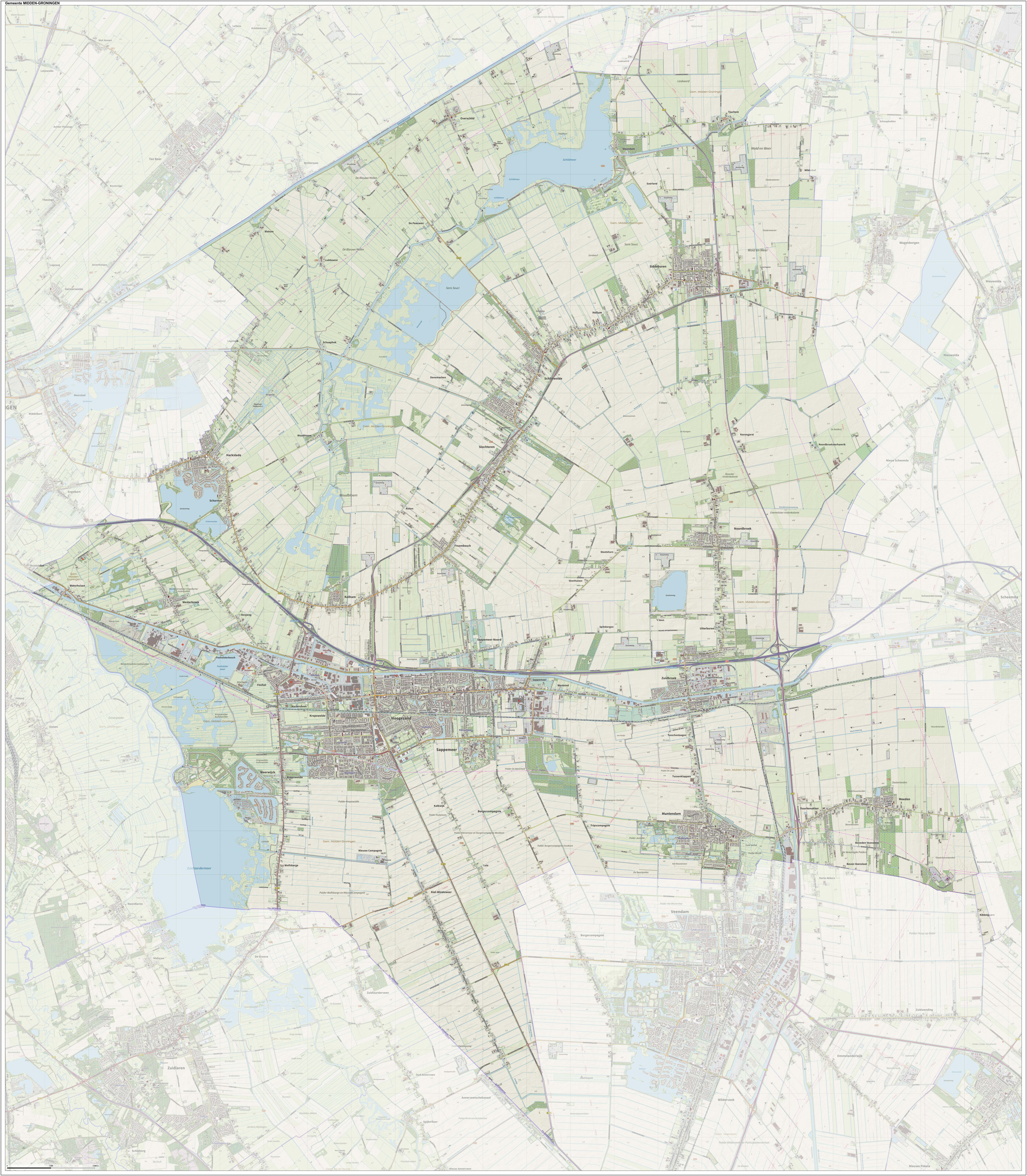
Map of the municipality of Midden-Groningen

On 15 March 2016, the new name for the merged municipality was announced in the village center of Zuidbroek. Midden-Groningen was opted out by the residents among two other nominees - Hogewolden and Woldmeren - with 48 percent of the votes. On 26 April 2016, the name was confirmed by the three municipal councils.

== Gallery ==
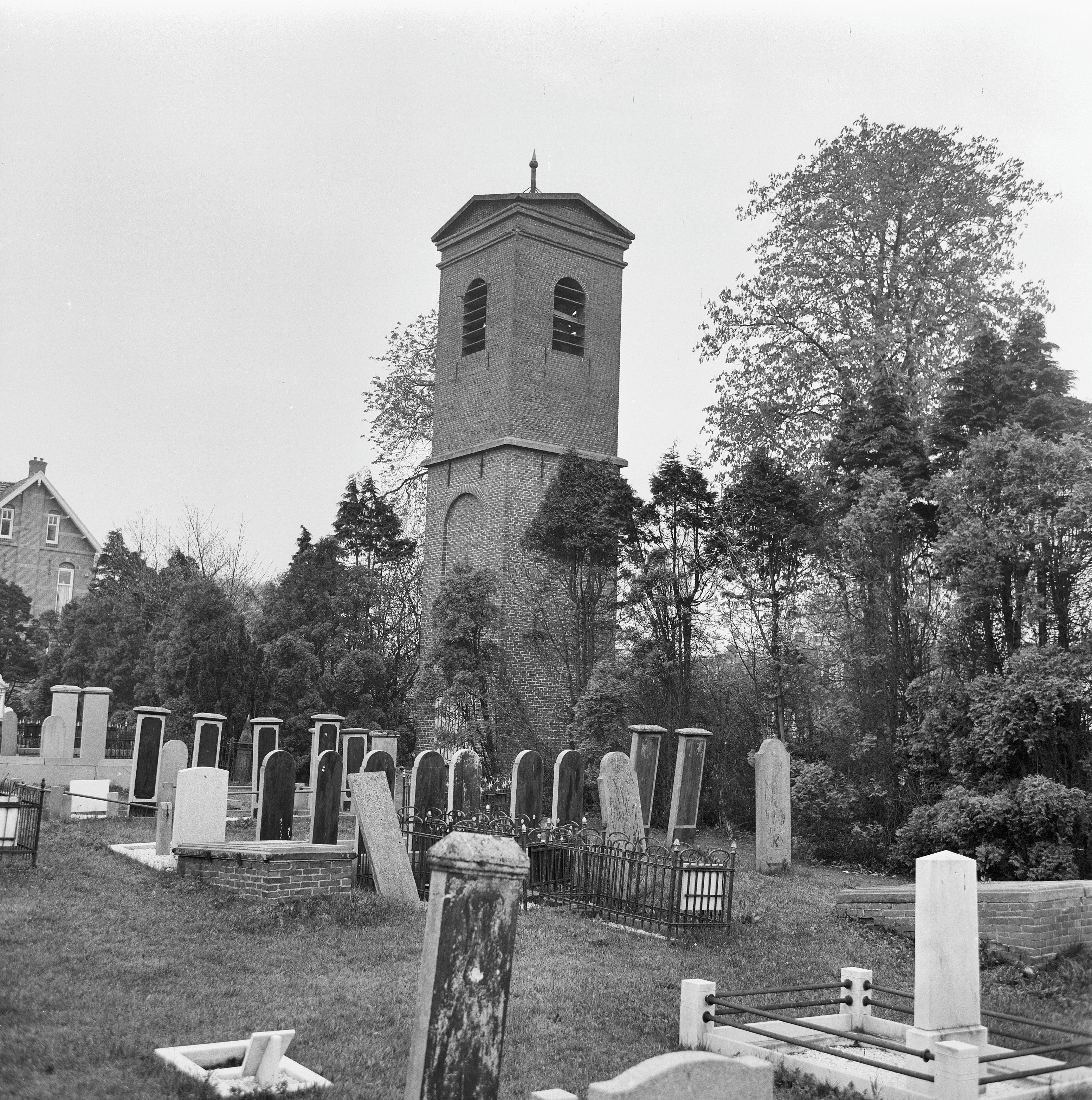
NH Cemetery, Hoogezand

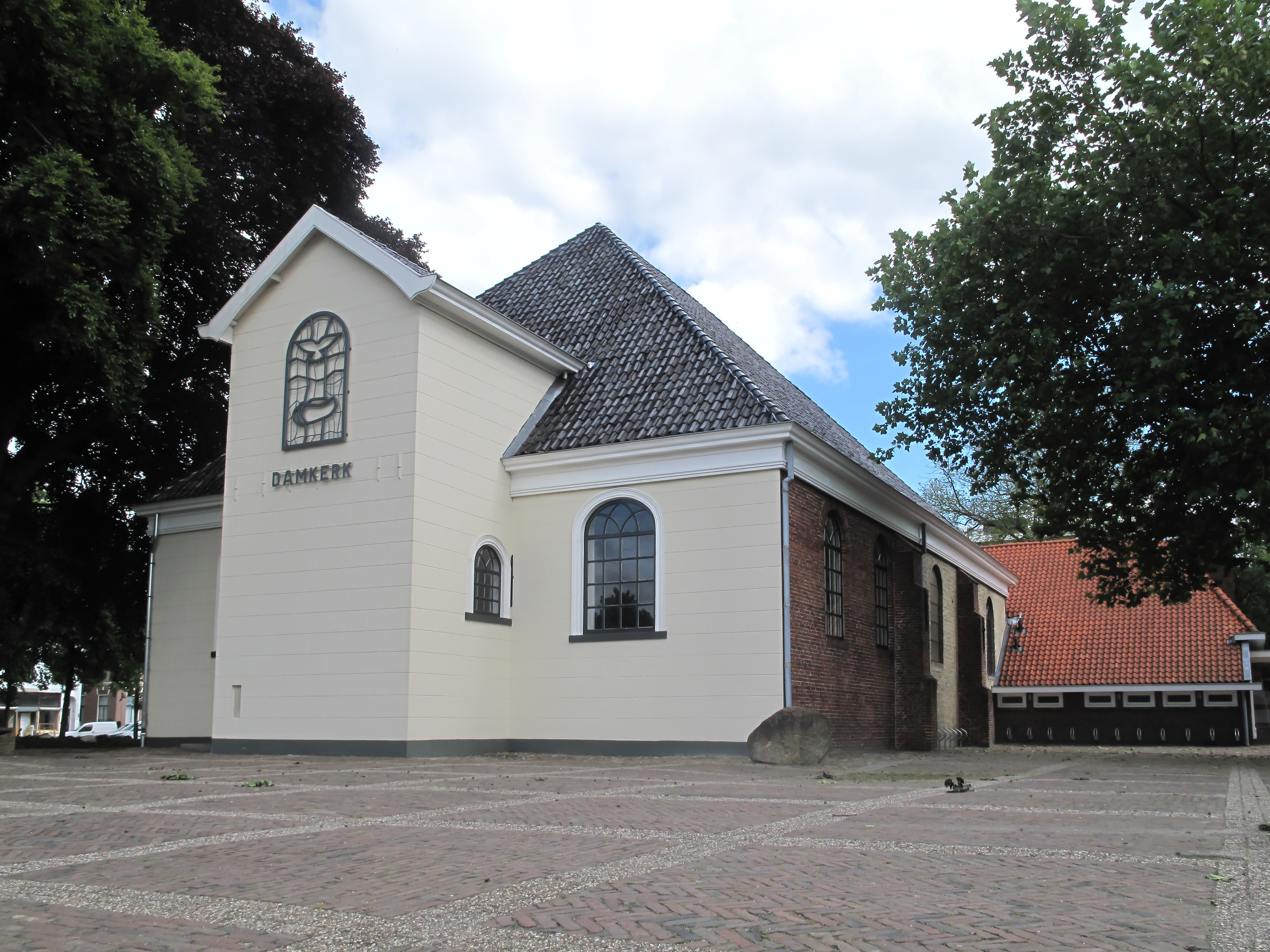
Damkerk, Hoogezand

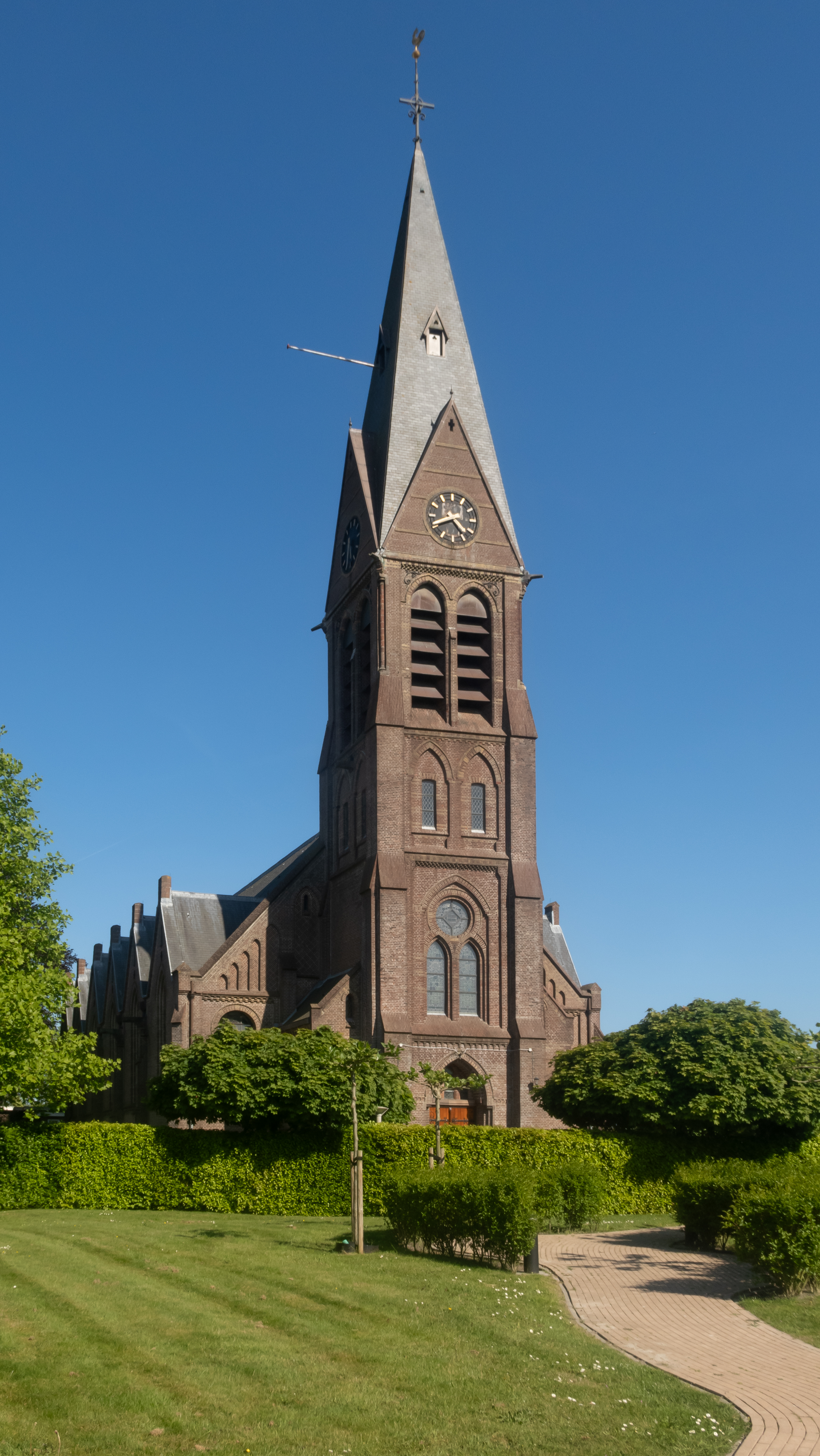
St. Willibrordus Church, Sappemeer

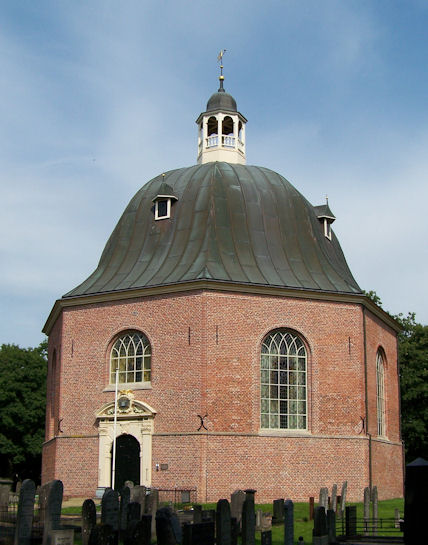
Dome church, Sappemeer

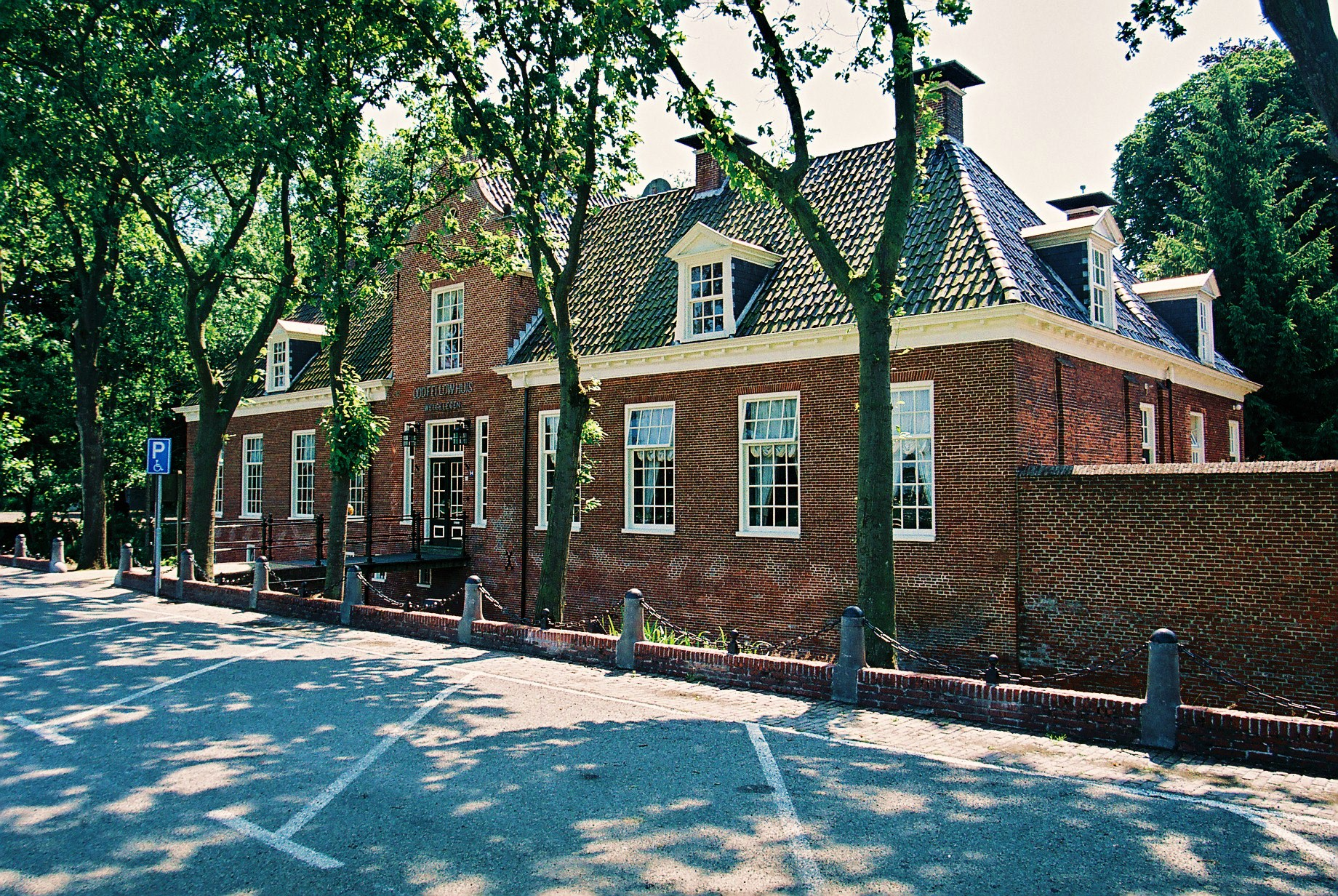
Borg Welgelegen, Sappemeer
