= Tripscompagnie =

Tripscompagnie Gronings: Tripskomnij
- Village
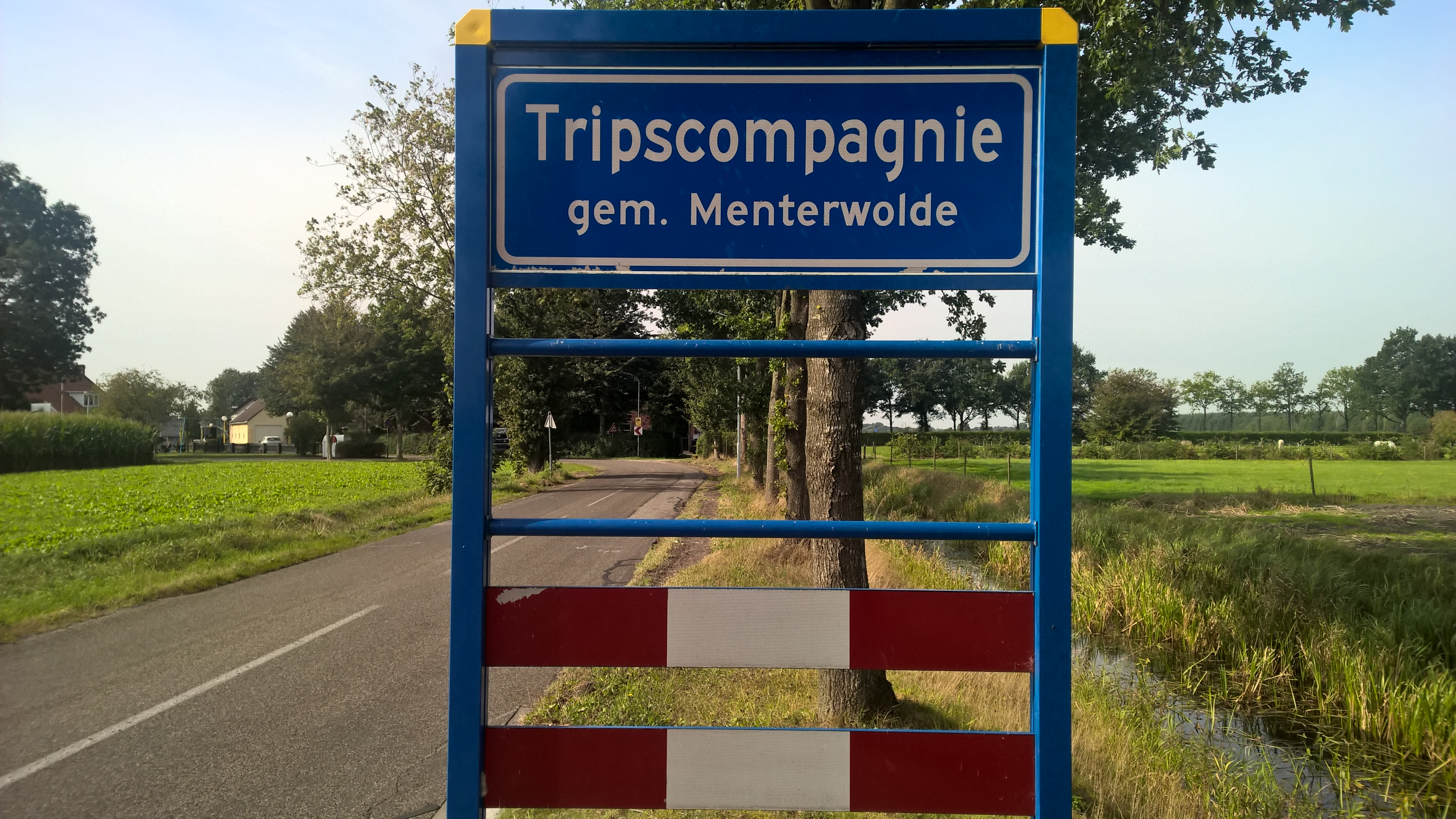
- Entry sign of Tripscompagnie

- Location in the province of Groningen in the Netherlands Tripscompagnie (Netherlands)
- Coordinates: 53.13827°N 6.82511°E
- Country: Netherlands
- Province: Groningen
- Municipality: Midden-Groningen Veendam

Area
  - Total: 5.75 km^{2} (2.22 sq mi)
  - Land: 5.68 km^{2} (2.19 sq mi)
  - Water: 0.07 km^{2} (0.027 sq mi)
- Elevation: 1.7 m (5.6 ft)

Population (2023)
  - Total: 110
  - Density: 19/km^{2} (50/sq mi)
- Time zone: UTC+1 (CET)
  - Summer (DST): UTC+2 (CEST)
- Postcode: 9633
- Area code: 0598

Tripscompagnie (Dutch: [ˈtrɪpsˌkɔm.pɑnˌji]; Gronings: Tripskomnij) is a small linear village in the municipalities of Midden-Groningen and Veendam, in the province of Groningen. It is located approximately two kilometers west of Muntendam. Bigger towns in its vicinity are Hoogezand and Sappemeer to the northwest, and Veendam to the southeast.

== History ==
The village originated along a canal, the Tripscompagniesterdiep, which was dug in 1640 by order of Adriaan Trip to extract peat from the surrounding bogs. The village was founded eight years later. After the peat extraction, arable farming became important. Many farm buildings in the village are of the Oldambt type.

From 1863 to 1983 there was a primary school in the village. At the time of its closure, it was the smallest school in the Netherlands with two pupils. After the school closed, the building became a village hall.

From 1898 to 1923, the potato flour factory l'Esperance was located in the village. In addition, from the beginning of the 20th century, there was a café, a carriage factory, and a smithy. A stone polder mill was built on the Nieuweweg in 1872, and the remains now serve as a holiday home under the name Torentje van Trips.

The company Nedmag extracts magnesium salts for industrial applications in Tripscompagnie.
