= Kolham =

- Village
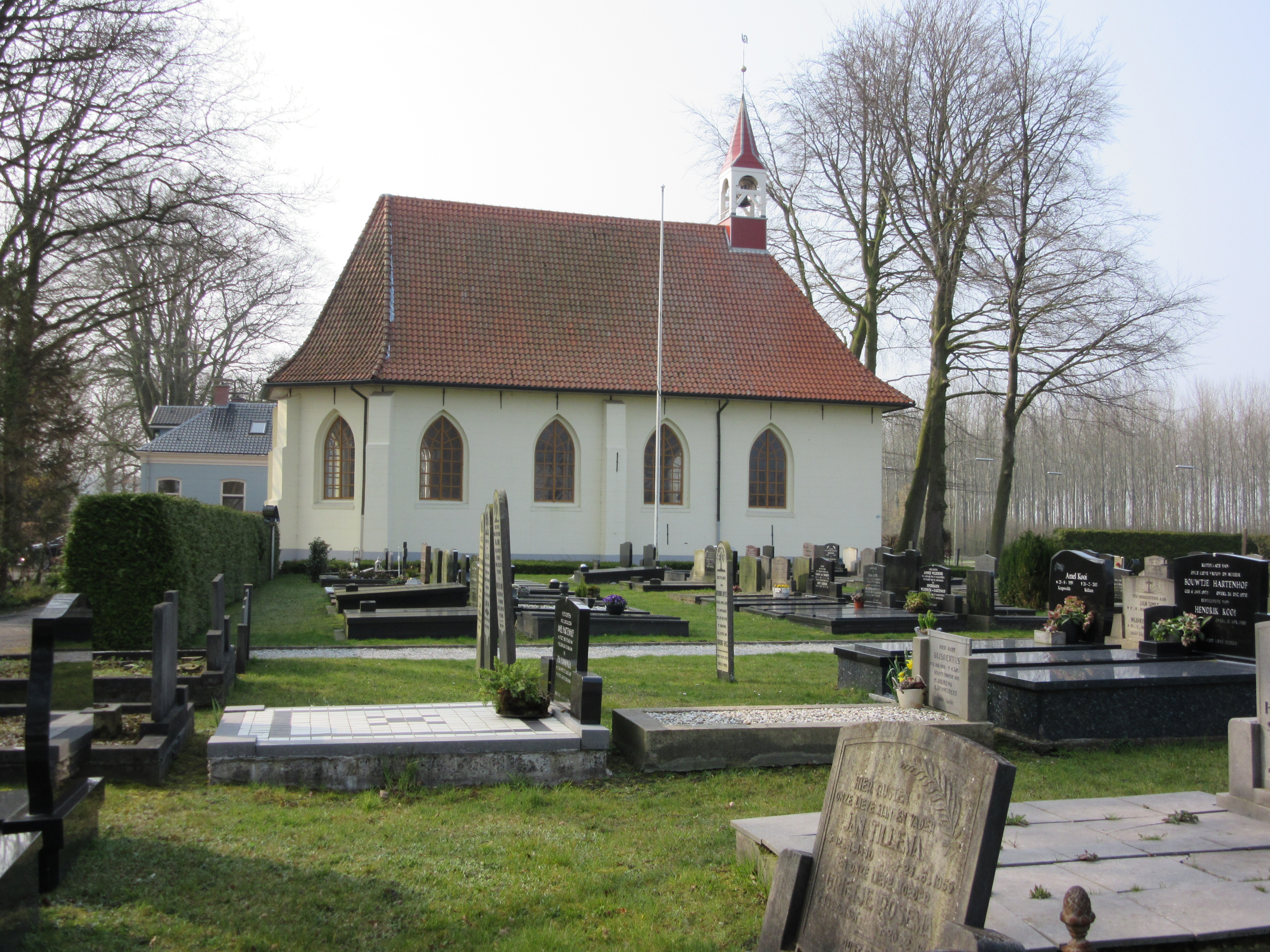
- Church at Kolham

- Location in province of Groningen in the Netherlands Kolham (Netherlands)
- Coordinates: 53.1815°N 6.7427°E
- Country: Netherlands
- Province: Groningen
- Municipality: Midden-Groningen

Area
  - Total: 9.91 km^{2} (3.83 sq mi)
- Elevation: 1 m (3.3 ft)

Population (2021)
  - Total: 1,345
  - Density: 136/km^{2} (352/sq mi)
- Time zone: UTC+1 (CET)
  - Summer (DST): UTC+2 (CEST)
- Postal code: 9615
- Dialing code: 0598

Kolham is a village in the Dutch province of Groningen. It is part of the municipality of Midden-Groningen. In 1959, natural gas was discovered at Kolham. Later, it was revealed that Groningen gas field was the largest natural gas field in Europe.

== History ==
Kolham was originally a road village on a sandy ridge. It was first mentioned as Hamme in 1266. The suffix -ham indicates silted land in a bend of a river. "Kol(d)" is later addition, and most likely refers to a cold and windy spot. The Dutch Reformed Church was built in 1641, and contains 15th century parts. Kolham was a separate parish, but belonged to the heerlijkheid of Slochteren until 1794. It became part of the municipality of Slochteren.

Kolham used to be a linear settlement along the main road. In the early 20th century, houses were built along the side roads. In 1929, a train station was built along the railway line to Weiwerd. The station and railway line closed in 1941. The hamlet of Foxham used to belong to Kolham. In 1943, the Winschoterdiep was dug, and Foxham was transferred to Hoogezand.

On 29 May 1959, the Nederlandse Aardolie Maatschappij was performing a test drill on the land of farmer Kornelis Boon. At a depth of 2,659 metres (8,724 ft) the drill hit gas, and a large flame appeared which could be seen in the city of Groningen. In 1960, gas was discovered near Delfzijl in the same layer. The Groningen gas field turned out to be the largest natural gas field in Europe. Boon was paid for the drill and a parcel of his land, however the gas benefits went to the State of the Netherlands.

In 2017, the municipality of Slochteren merged into Midden-Groningen.

== Gallery ==
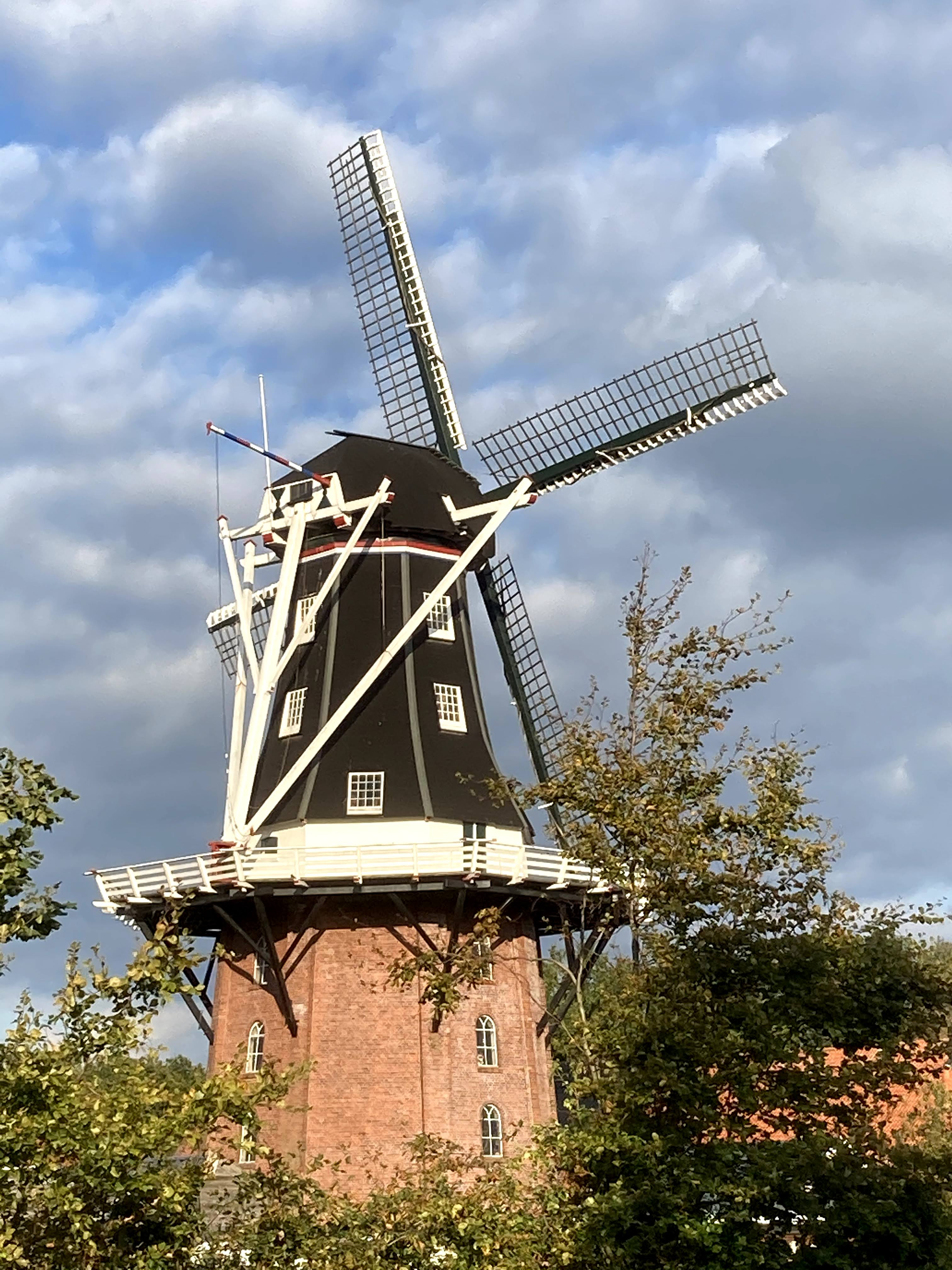
Windmill the Enterprise

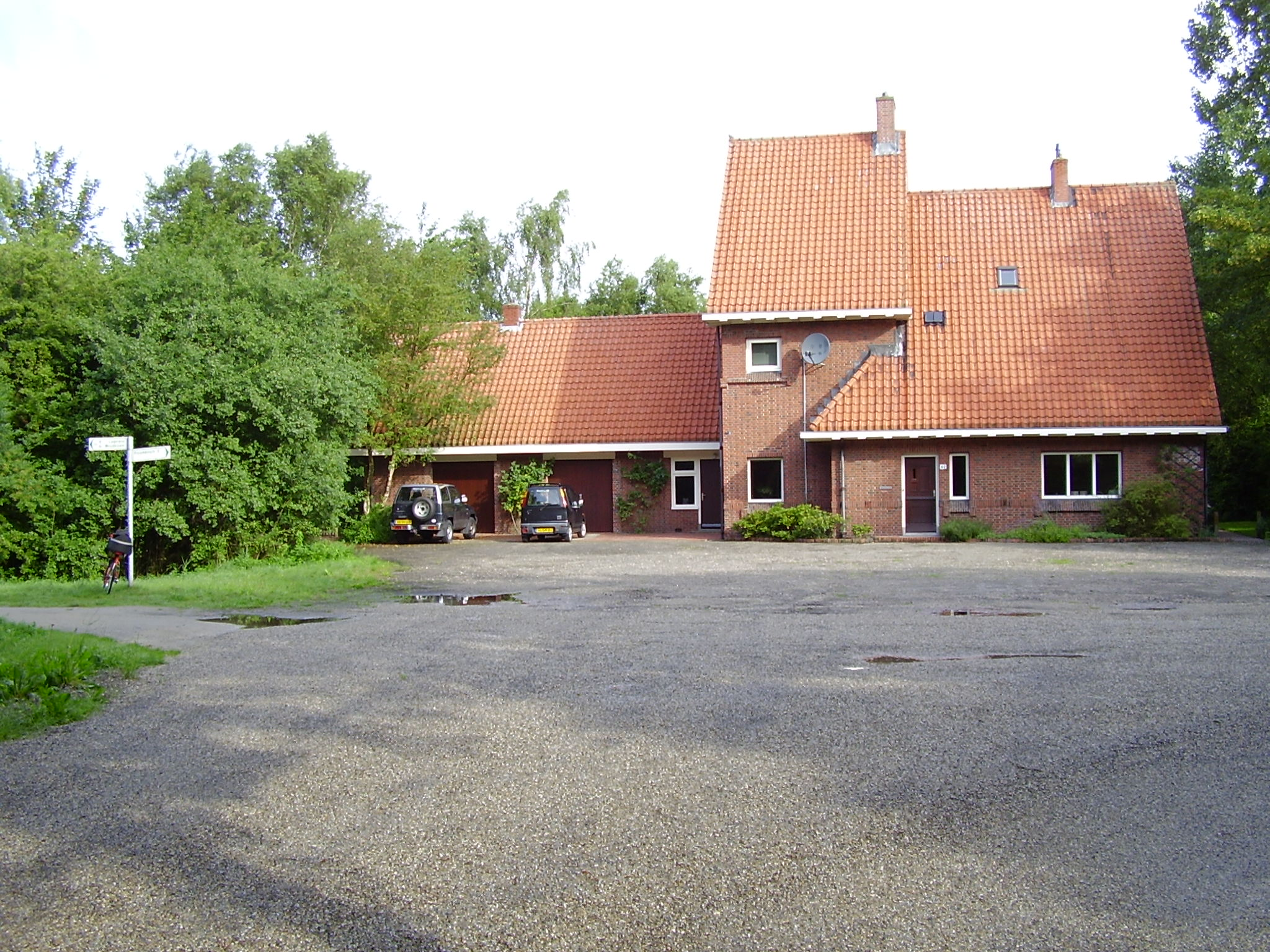
Former train station

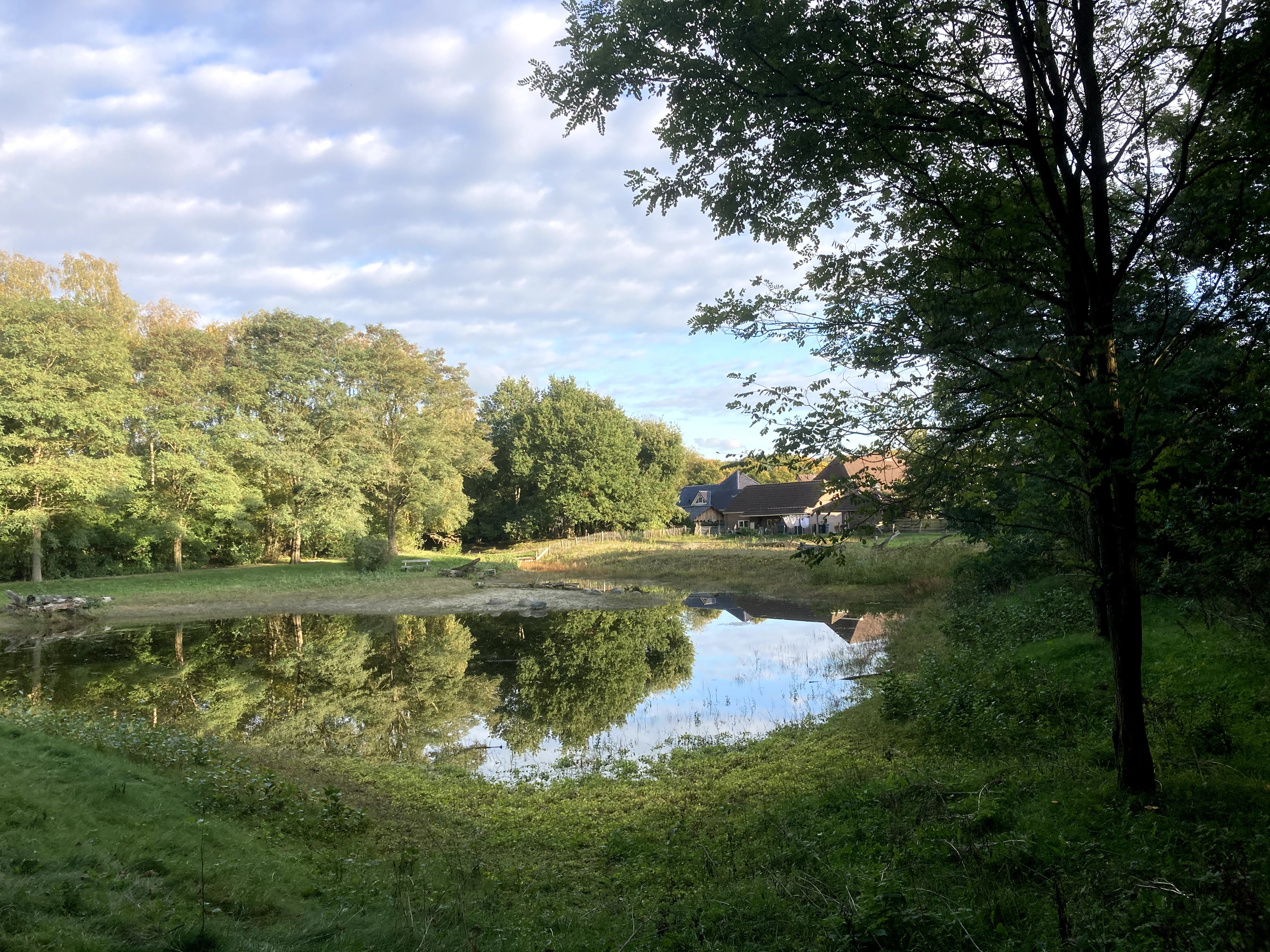
Nature near Kolham

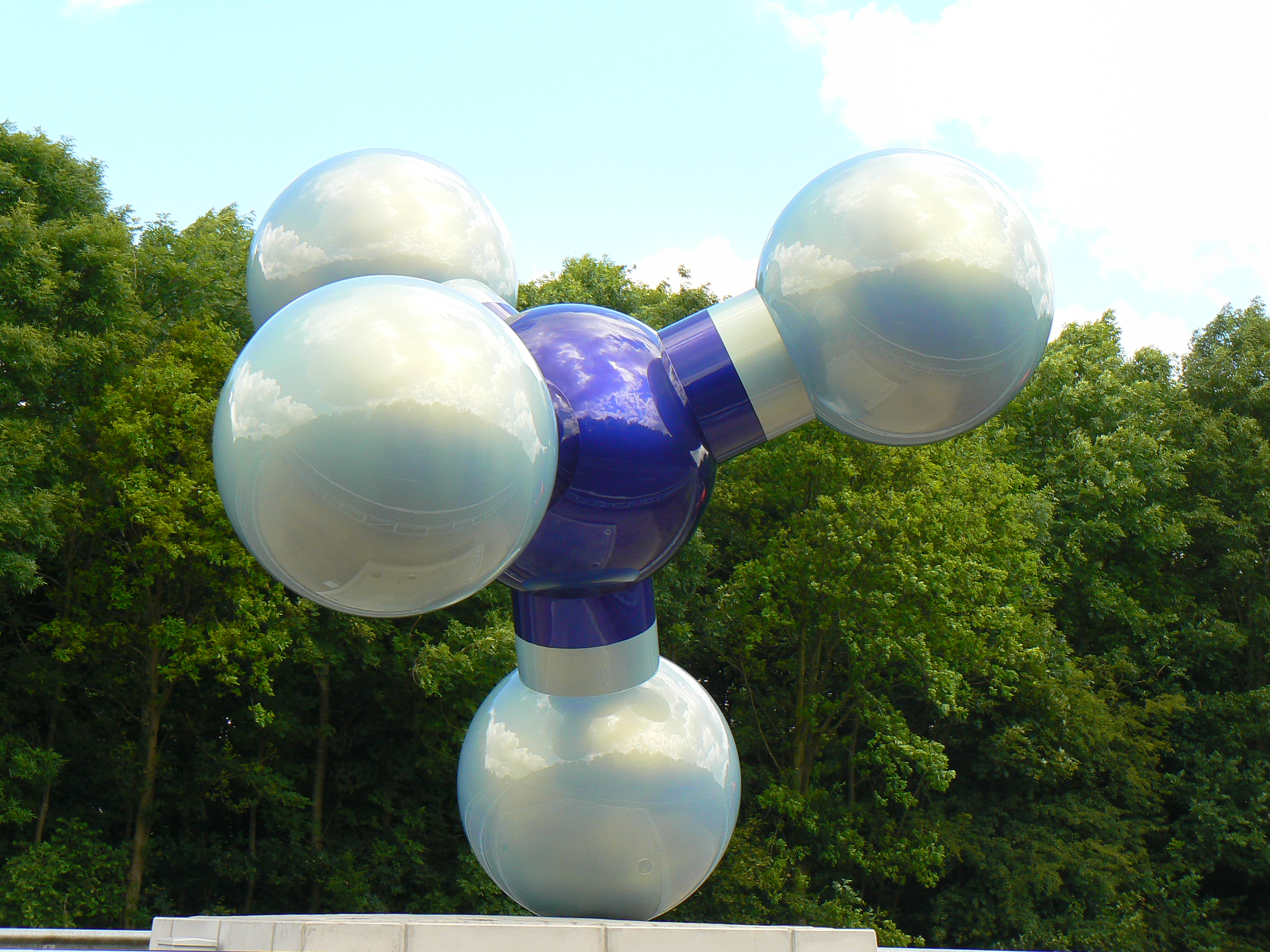
Gasmolecule sculpture by Marc Ruygrok (2009)
