= Borgercompagnie =

- Village
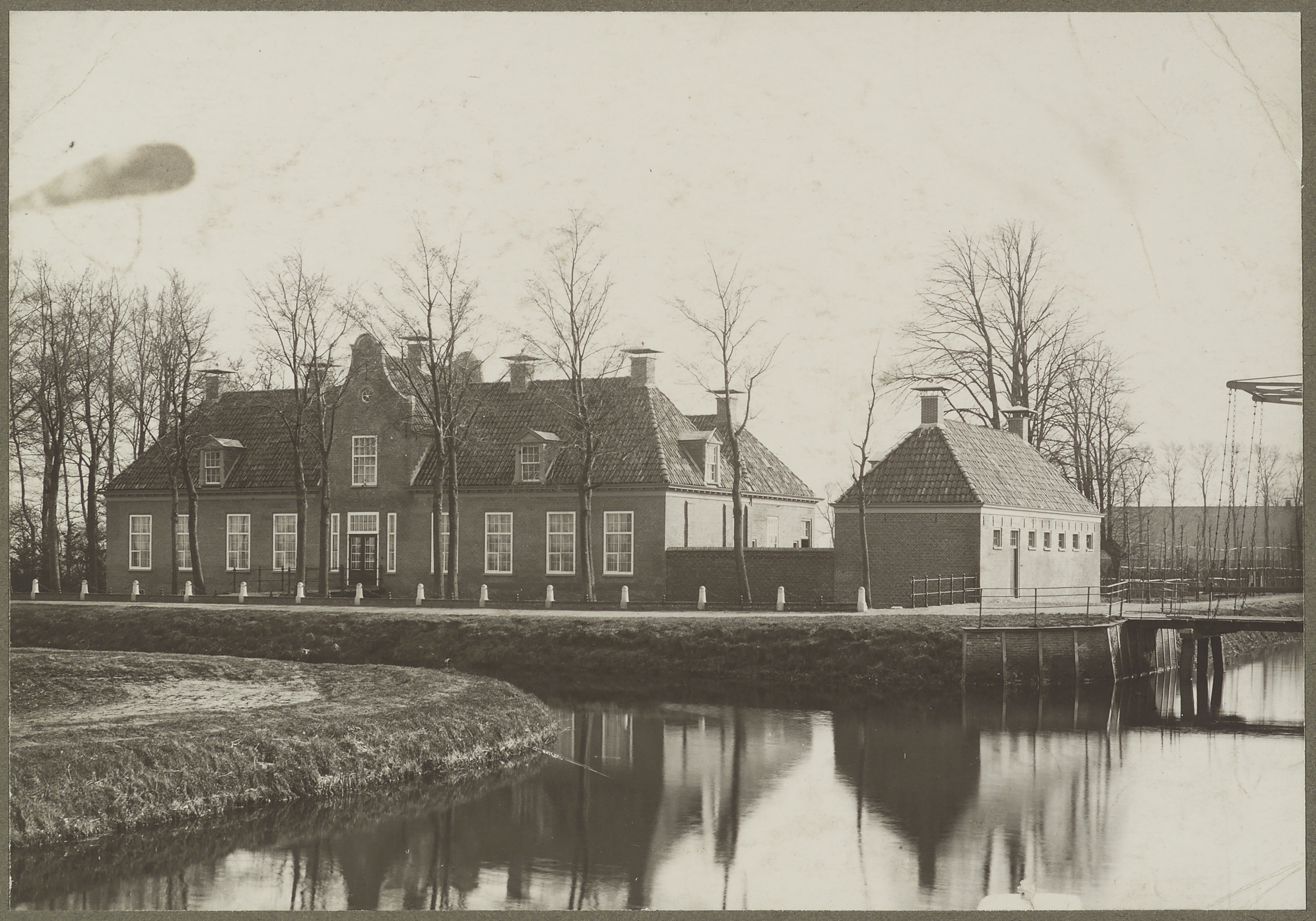
- Huize Welgelegen

- Location of Borgercompagnie in the province of Groningen Borgercompagnie (Netherlands)
- Coordinates: 53°6′49″N 6°49′13″E
- Country: Netherlands
- Province: Groningen
- Municipality: Midden-Groningen, Veendam
- Established: 1647

Area
  - Total: 7.79 km^{2} (3.01 sq mi)
- Elevation: 2 m (6.6 ft)

Population (2021)
  - Total: 490
  - Density: 63/km^{2} (160/sq mi)
- Postal code: 9631–9632

Borgercompagnie (Dutch pronunciation: [ˌbɔrɣərkɔmpɑˈɲi]; Gronings: Börkomnij [ˈbœːkɔmˌnɛːi̯]) is a village in the Dutch province of Groningen. It consists of a single street with farms and houses on both sides. The village is about 7 km long. The north end lies close to Sappemeer in the municipality of Midden-Groningen, and the south end lies in the municipality of Veendam.

The village was founded in 1647 by the Burger Compagnie (Citizen's Company) to exploit the peat. Borgercompagnie is a linear settlement along the canal. The northern section of the canal was filled up after 1940.

In 2005, a manure fermentation factory opened in Borgercompagnie. It was originally hailed as a progressive company and received a stimulation prize. It processes 35,000 tons of manure a year, and is in ongoing dispute with their neighbours and the municipality of Veendam due to the stench.
