= Muntendam =

- Village
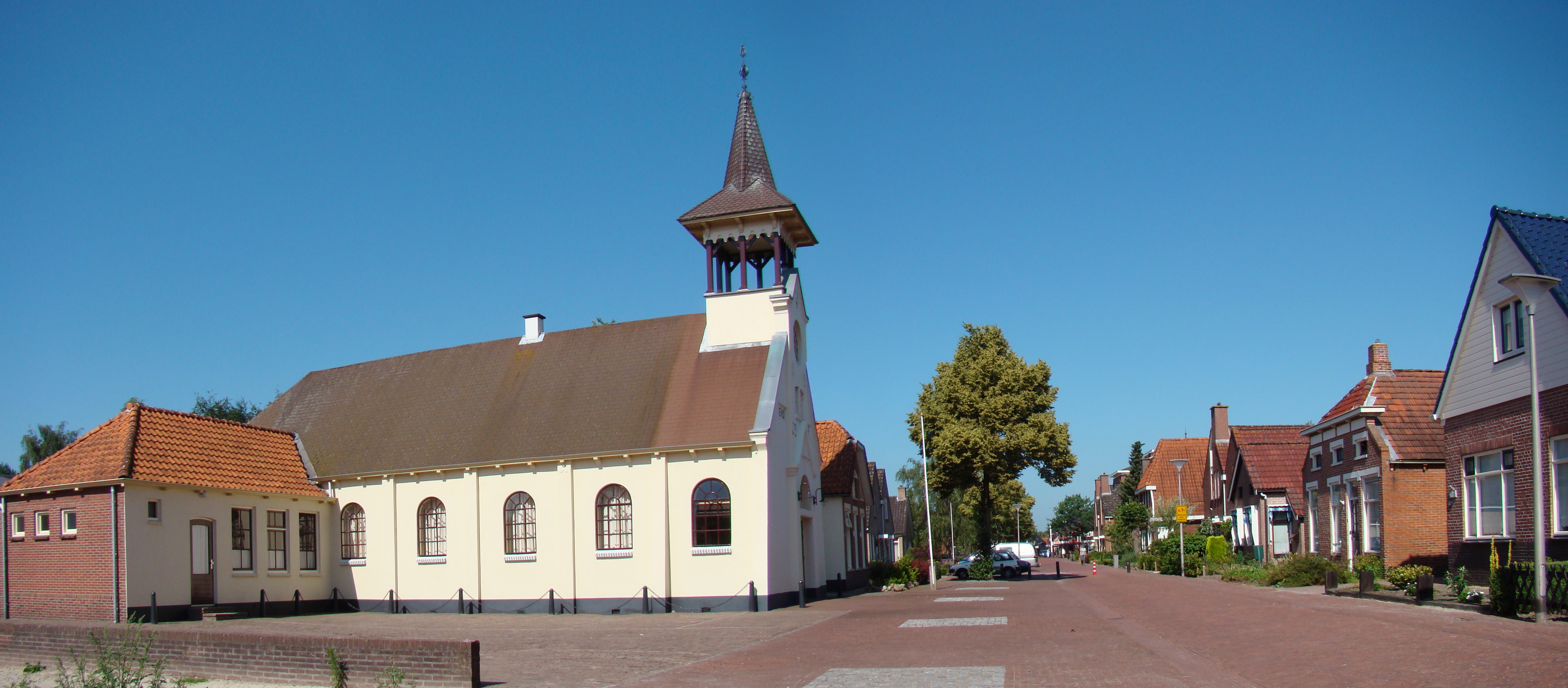
- Muntendam in 2011

- Location of Muntendam in the province of Groningen Muntendam (Netherlands)
- Coordinates: 53°8′1″N 6°52′7″E
- Country: Netherlands
- Province: Groningen
- Municipality: Midden-Groningen

Area
  - Total: 12.88 km^{2} (4.97 sq mi)
- Elevation: 2.2 m (7.2 ft)

Population (2021)
  - Total: 4,635
  - Density: 359.9/km^{2} (932.0/sq mi)
- Time zone: UTC+1 (CET)
  - Summer (DST): UTC+2 (CEST)
- Postal code: 9649
- Dialing code: 0598

Muntendam is a village in the municipality of Midden-Groningen, in the Dutch province of Groningen. The village has a population of 4,635 (2021). Muntendam had been an independent parish since the Middle Ages, but until 1840 it was ecclesiastically part of Zuidbroek.

From 1811 until 1990 it was a separate municipality, which boasted the title 'reddest (most socialist) municipality in the Netherlands', with a council of 11 containing 7 PvdA (Labour Party) members and 2 CPN (Communist Party) members. (However, nearby Reiderland had had a vast CPN majority since WWII, so the claim is rather too strong). When a new mayor had to be appointed in 1980 (at the time a municipality had no say in the matter), it was assumed that it would become a PvdA mayor as it had always been. However, the then minister of the interior, Hans Wiegel of the right-wing VVD, decided that this very left-wing part of the Netherlands needed a change and appointed a D66 (left of centre) mayor. This led to a cold reception and the first time a Dutch mayor was not officially inaugurated. Over time, however, people started to like him and when he moved to a bigger municipality there was even an action to keep him (to no avail). Not much later, the method of appointing a mayor in the Netherlands was changed, with the municipality putting up a request which is usually followed.

== Gallery ==
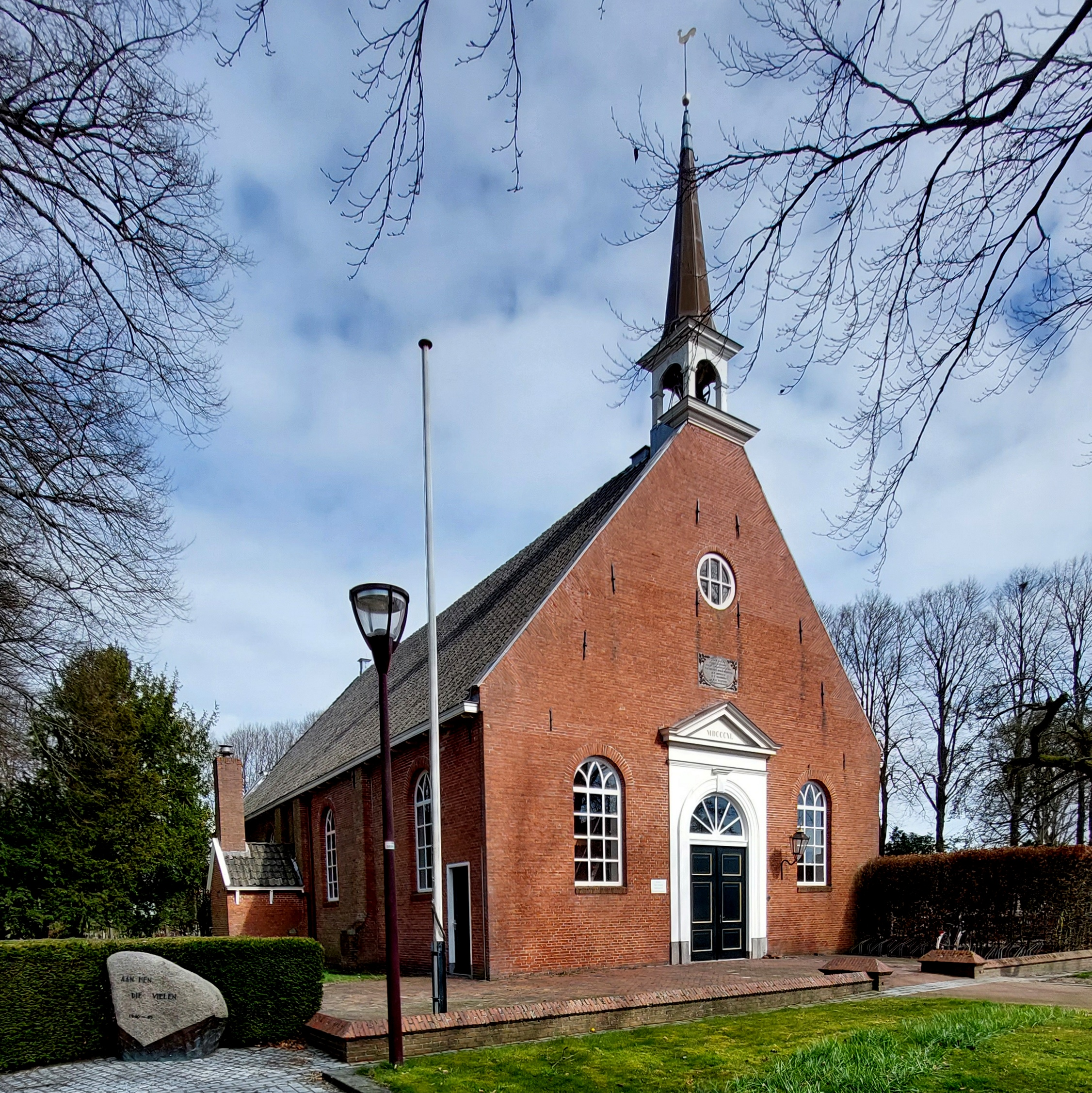
Protestant church

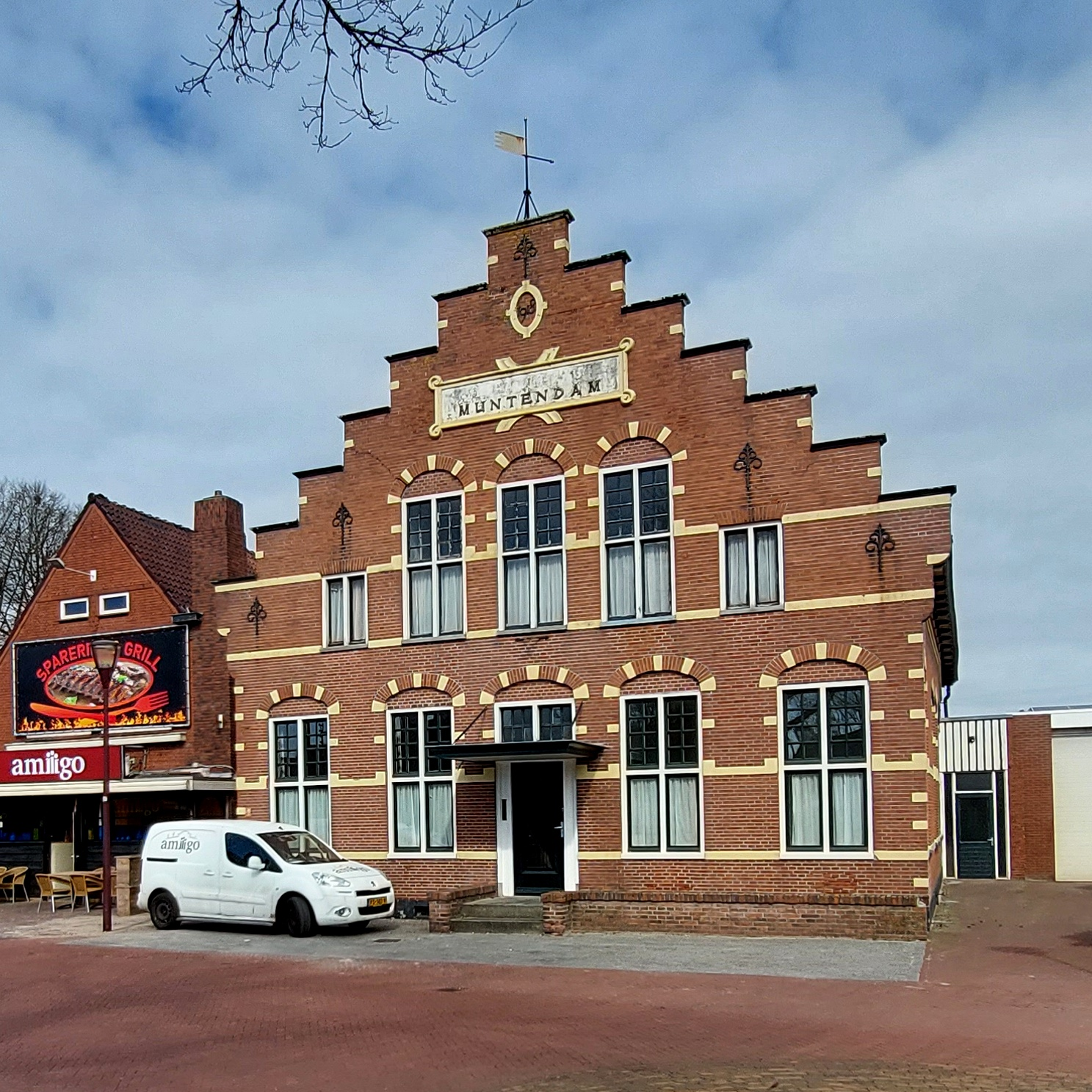
Former town hall

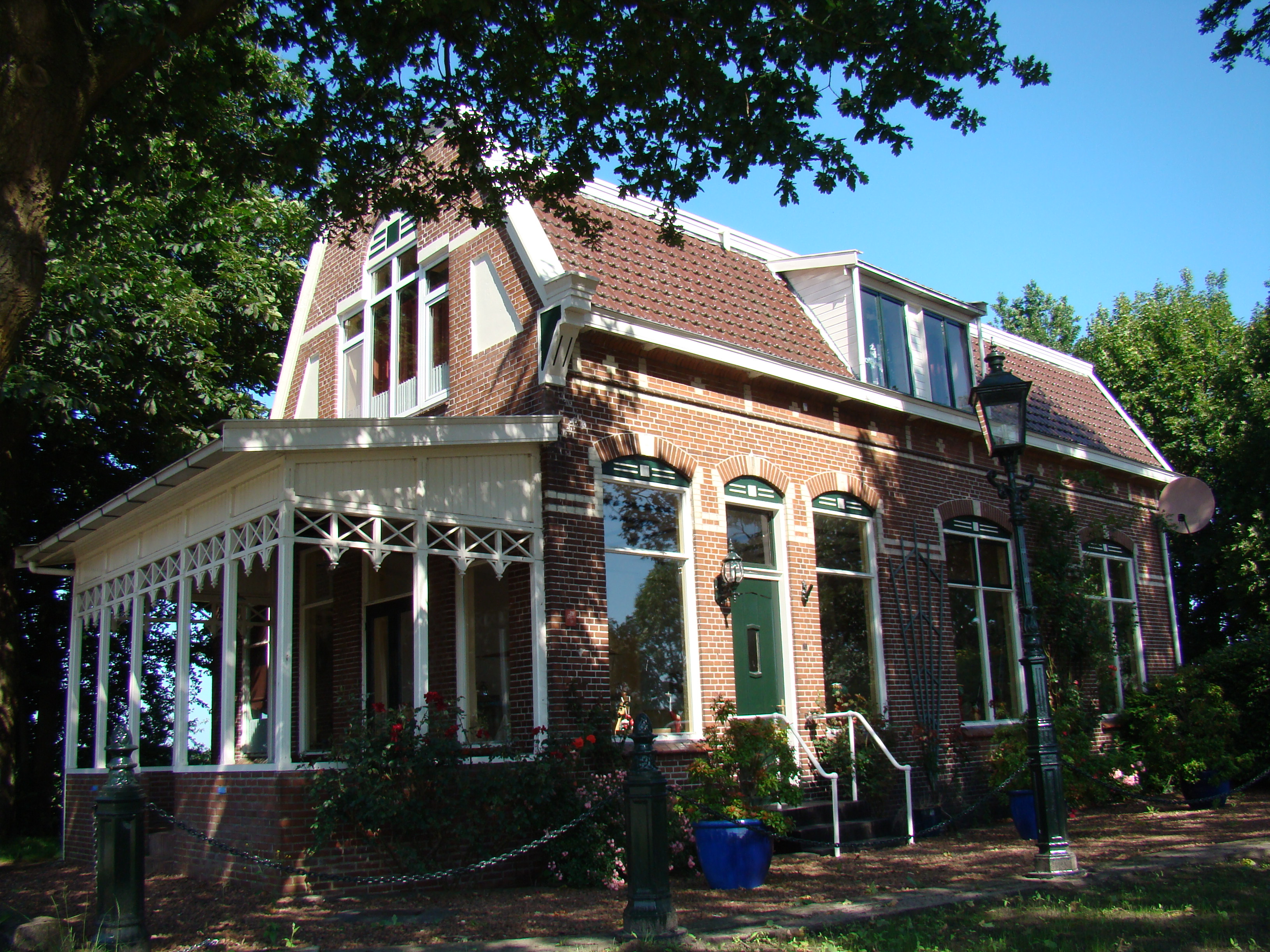
House in Muntendam

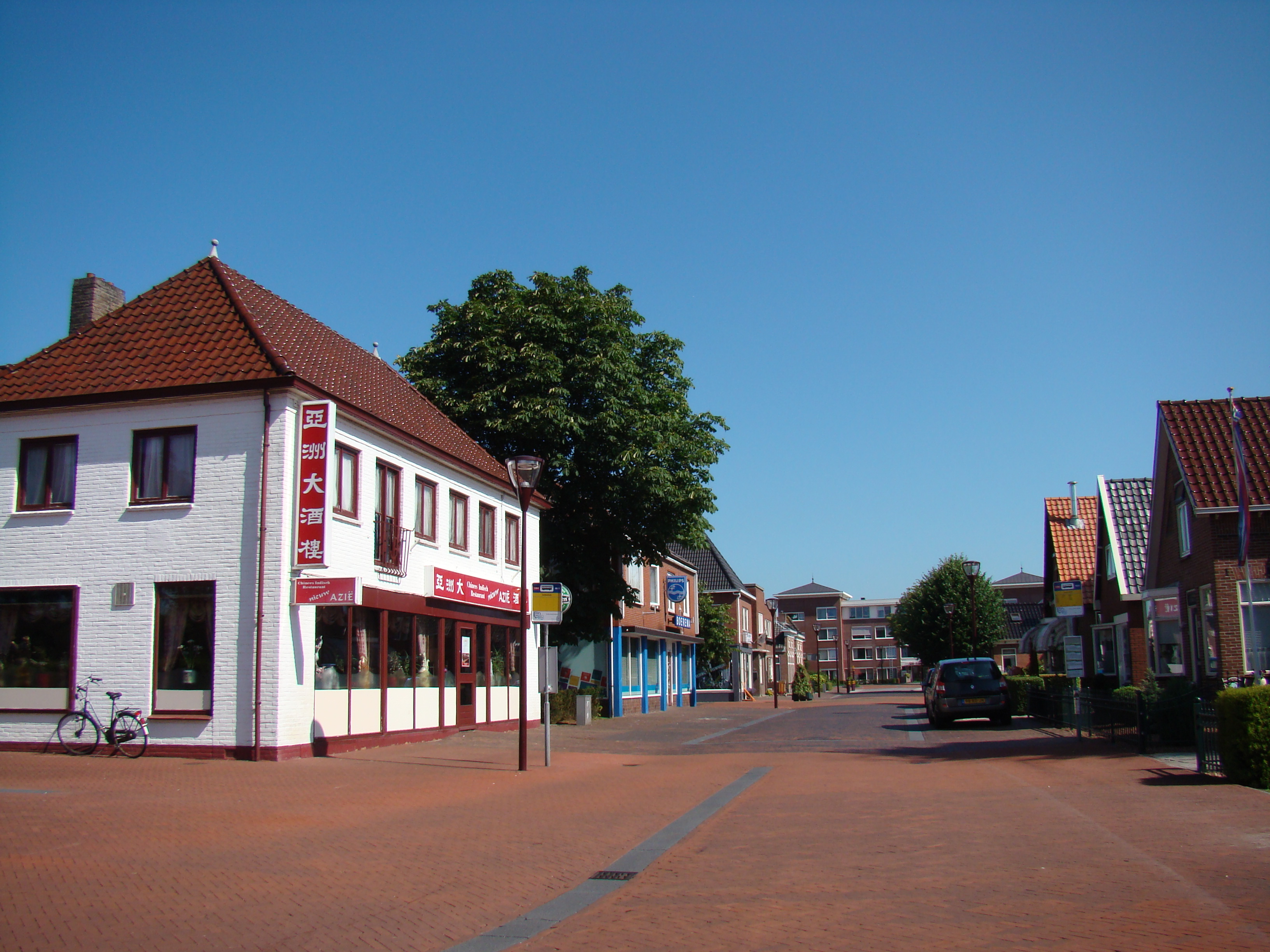
Street view
