= Henric Piccardt =

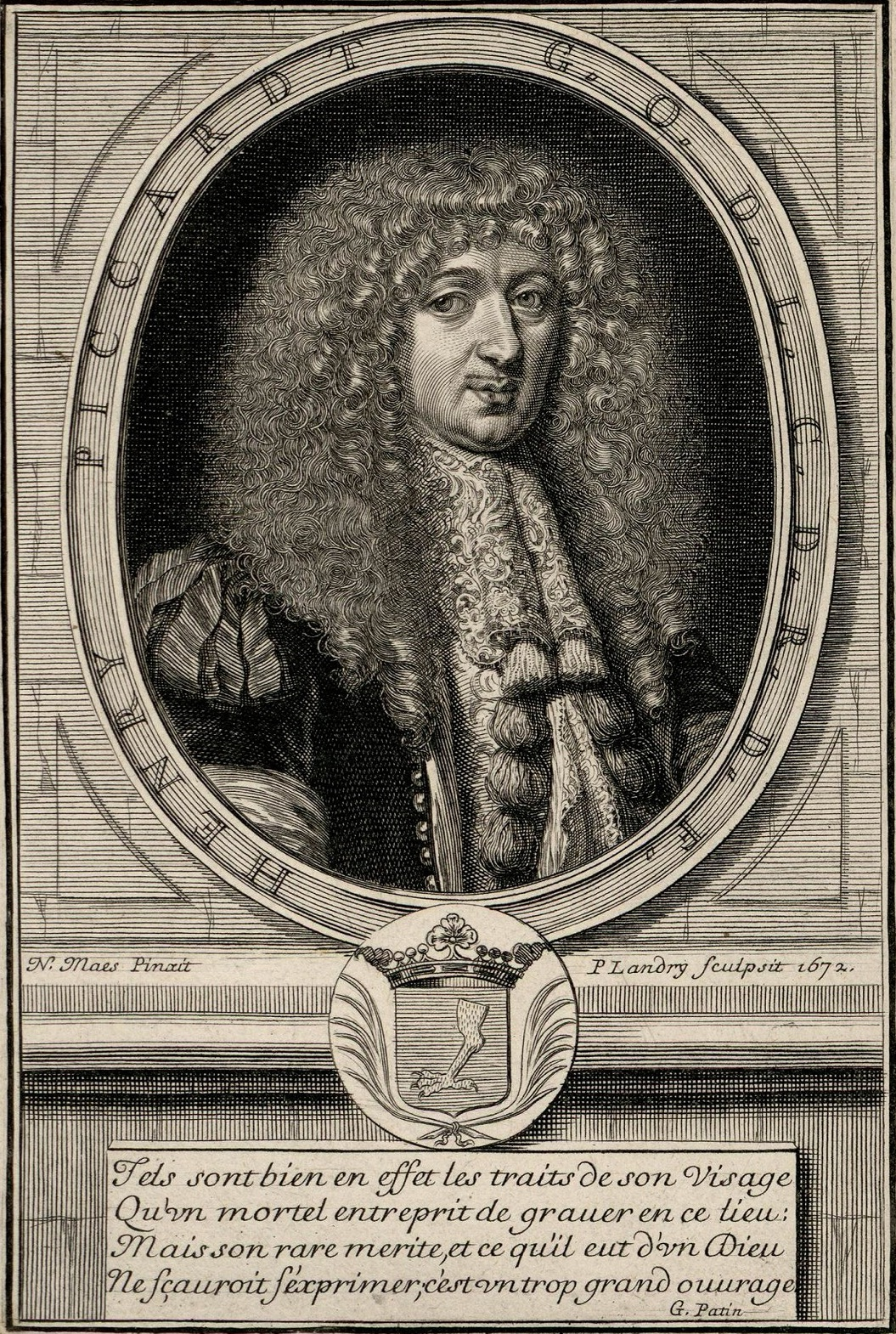
Portrait of Henric Piccardt. Engraving by Pierre Henri Landry from 1672 after a lost painting by Nicolaes Maes. Under the portrait, a Quatrain by Guy Patin.

Henric Piccardt (25 March 1636, Woltersum – 6 May 1712, Harkstede) was an ambitious Dutch lawyer who made good at the court of young king Louis XIV of France in Paris where he became a published poet in French. Returning to the Netherlands, he rose to become syndic of the Ommelanden of Groningen and the untitled lord of the majestic manor at Slochteren, the Fraeylemaborg.

== Early life ==
Piccardt hailed from Stad en Ommelanden – the city of Groningen and the semi-autonomous surrounding lands in the northern Netherlands. He was the son of Gualtherus Piccardt (1602–1678), the Protestant pastor of Woltersum, and his first wife Harmtien Hindriks Olinghe (c.1608–1641). He had a sister; his two brothers studied theology and entered the ministry. Henric chose to read law at the university of Groningen, soon moving on to the university of Franeker in Friesland (1657–1658). Here he gave an oration on eloquence and law on 14 December 1658, publishing it as his Oratio de eloquentia & conjunctione ejusdem cum jurisprudentia in early 1659. Apparently without his father’s permission he traveled to the University of Orléans in France, where he earned a doctorate cum laude in law around 1660.

== In Paris ==
Although Louis XIV would be attacking the Dutch Republic in 1672, he enjoyed a short-lived but generally favorable press in the Dutch Republic in the early 1660s. At this time Piccardt came to Paris. From gleanings of his now lost autobiography, his nineteenth-century biographers tell a romantic story of Henric – black patch over one eye – earning his keep by singing songs on the Pont Neuf to the strumming of his harp. Passing ladies found him fetching, befriended him and introduced Henric to the pleasures of courtly life in the evenings. He is said to have then raised Louis XIV’s jealousies by sporting with one of the latter’s mistresses. Allegedly spirited out of Paris by friendly Freemasons, he is said to have made his way back to the Netherlands by way of Italy and Germany. This tale is repeated in catalogues for historical exhibitions in northern manors. Whatever the merits of this account, more accurate information can be extracted from a volume of poetry - in the then fashionable style of 'baroque noir' - that Piccardt published at Paris in 1663: Les poésies françoises dediées à Madame Suzanne de Pons, Dame de la Gastevine (Paris: Jacques le Gras). The prefaces indicate not only some of Piccardt’s friends and their evaluation of him but also his own ideas on literary style. Moreover, many of the poems (sonnets but also madrigals etc.) are dedicated to courtisans who can be identified, and some describe his experiences at festivities of the court (such as the great Ballet des Arts of 8 January 1663, written by Isaac de Benserade and Jean-Baptiste Lully with a main role for Louis XIV). Piccardt moved especially in Huguenot circles of nobility, and he seems to have worked, too, as a tutor or governor of their sons. His remarkable success at court is clear from his appointment by Louis XIV as Gentilhomme ordinaire de la chambre du Roi de France. Piccardt was well-acquainted with nobility in the orbits of Louis II de Bourbon-Condé (1621–1686), called “Le Grande Condé”, and Henri de Massué, marquis de Ruvigny (1610–1689), and he visited, too, the salon of madame Caron, née Constantia Boudaen, intimate with the scientific and scholarly Huygens family. In the course of his travels, Piccardt became close to the family of the burgomaster of Leipzig, Christian Lorenz von Adlershelm (1606–1684). Christina Regina directed the family’s unique Cabinet of Natural Curiosities, and Henric was briefly engaged to her sister Johanna (1630–1680), who dedicated to him her Verteutschte Stratonica (Amsterdam, 1666).

== Return to the Dutch Republic and Groningen ==
In 1672 the Dutch Republic was attacked simultaneously from three sides by Louis XIV, Bernhard von Galen, the bishop of Münster, and by England. Piccardt had returned to Groningen that spring and after the bishop had been driven back to Münster at the end of August, he was promptly arrested by the town authorities ostensibly because of his proximity to the French court. The minutes of his interrogations (today preserved in the Groningen Archives) add to knowledge of his travels and background. Released after half a year through the pressure of his friend, Stadtholder William III of Orange, Piccardt became an influential politician. As syndic, he helped unite the city of Groningen and the Ommelanden, and thus played a part in the political consolidation and defense of the north of the Dutch Republic. Of non-aristocratic birth and with the tastes of a French courtier, Piccardt tried unsuccessfully to become a member of the rigid and self-important aristocracy of Groningen. He married Anna Elisabeth Rengers (1657-1704), the daughter of the influential lord of the Fraeylemaborg at Slochteren and was able to purchase that manor with a loan from William III. Piccardt oversaw a range of architectural innovations. He rebuilt the Fraeylemaborg and restyled its enormous grounds into a French formal garden. He extended the smaller manor Klein Martijn at Harkstede where he and his wife lived. He was the builder of the High Church of Harkstede. A gifted instrumentalist on harp and organ, Piccardt engaged Arp Schnitger (1648–1719) to build an organ for the Harkstede church and also a house-organ for Klein Martijn. As a bibliophile he was no doubt also content with his function as long-time curator of the university of Groningen. In Paris Henric Piccardt had led a highly amorous life and he was the author of early-baroque French poetry. There is no indication that he continued in that vein after his return to Groningen. On the contrary, he fell in with the staunch Calvinism of these parts (a good friend was Paulus Hulsius (1653–1712), indefatigable philosophical and theological opponent at the university of Groningen of the mathematician Johann Bernoulli (1667–1748)). To poetry Piccardt seems to have returned only one final time when he wrote a sad poem of elegiac couplets in Latin on the death of his beloved wife Anna Rengers in 1704. In 1712 he was entombed beside her in the crypt of the church that they had built at Harkstede.

== Portraits ==
- Henric Piccardt (c.1672), engraving by Pierre Landry (1630–1701) after a portrait, now lost, by Nicolaes Maes (1634–1693), a student of Rembrandt; a quatrain printed under the engraving is by Guy Patin
- Henric Piccardt (c.1675) by Johan Starrenberg (fl.1670–1720) . NB This link misidentifies the artist; he is correctly Johan Starrenberg.
- Henric Piccardt (c.1690) by Herman Collenius (1650–1723)
- Anna Elisabeth Rengers (c.1690) by Herman Collenius (1650–1723)

== Piccardt’s works ==
- Oratio de eloquentia & conjunctione ejusdem cum jurisprudentia, Franeker: Johannes Arcerius, 1659.
- Les poésies françoises dediées à Madame Suzanne de Pons, Dame de la Gastevine, Paris: Jacques le Gras, 1663
- Manifest ou Defense des Droits Des Seigneurs des Ommelandes, d’entre L’Ems & Lawerts. Contre les Seigneurs de la Ville de Groningue, The Hague, 1677
- “Remonstratie van de Heeren van de Ommelanden”, February 11, 1677, in: Sommair verhael ofte recueil van vragen en antwoorden, voorgevallen in de examinibus met jr. Osebrandt Jan Rengers van Slochteren, Amsterdam, 1677
- Many pieces in Copulaten van remonstrantien, memorien, acten, resolutien, missiven, protesten, en andere stucken, gedient hebbende het different onlangs voorgevallen tusschenbeyde leden van stadt Groningen ende Ommelanden, Groningen, 1677.
- Letters by Piccardt from 1672/1673 were published by Tonckens, “Henric Piccardt” (see below)
- The Latin poem on his wife’s death is in: T.P. Tresling, “Henrik Piccardt”, in: Groninger Volks-Almanak 1840, pp. 1–12.
- Various Latin poems in miscellaneous seventeenth-century books.

== Bibliography ==
- N. Tonckens, “Henric Piccardt en het proces van 1672”, in: Groningsche Volksalmanak 1944, pp. 1–60
- K. van der Ploeg, “Gothic Architecture as Self-Representation. Henric Piccardt and the Church of Harkstede”, in: Vision in Text and Image. The Cultural Turn in the Study of Arts, eds. H.W. Hoen and M.G. Kemperink, Louvain: Peeters, 2008, pp. 67–87.
- J. Battjes and H. Ladrak, De toren uit het midden. Bouwhistorie en ontwerpmethodiek van de Fraeylemaborg en het Slochterbos, Groningen: Monnier, 2010.
- A.J. Vanderjagt, "Quand le Soleil paroist, la Lune n'est plus belle. Henric Piccardt (1636-1712, G.O.D.L.C.D.R.D.F.", in: Geistliche Literatur des Mittelalters und der Ftühen Neuzeit, Festgabe für Rudolf Suntrup, eds. Volker Honemann and Nine Miedema, Frankfurt am Main: Peter Lang, 2013, pp. 233–252.
- (historical romance) Arjo Vanderjagt, Ik, Piccardt! Een franse ommelander 1636-1712, Groningen: Nobelman, 2023.
