= Meerstad =

- Planned town
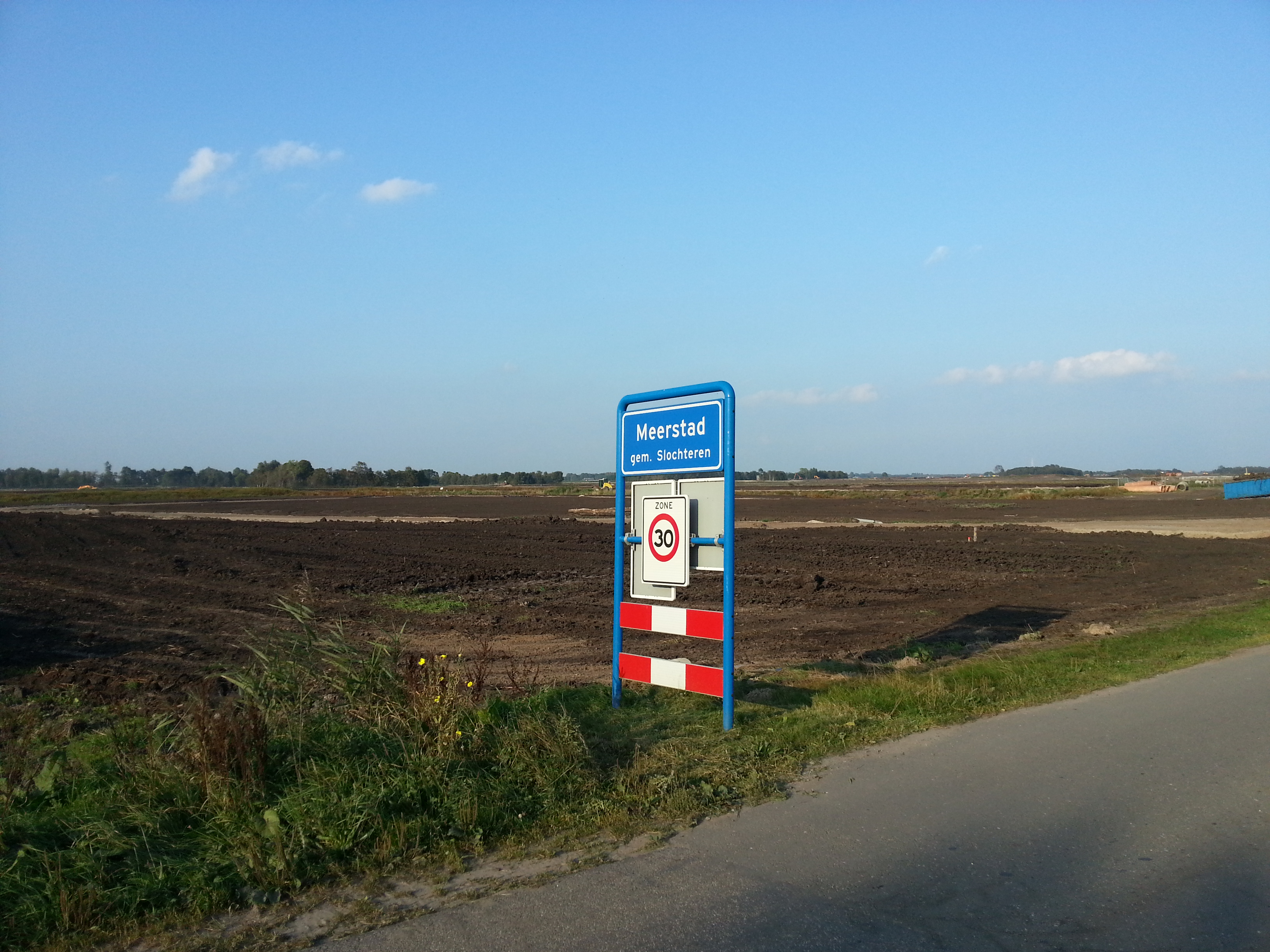
- Welcome to Meerstad (2014)

- Flag

- Location in province of Groningen in the Netherlands Meerstad (Netherlands)
- Coordinates: 53.2224°N 6.6531°E
- Country: Netherlands
- Province: Groningen
- Municipality: Groningen
- Established: 2007

Area
  - Total: 17.76 km^{2} (6.86 sq mi)
- Elevation: −1 m (−3.3 ft)

Population (2021)
  - Total: 2,595
  - Density: 146.1/km^{2} (378.4/sq mi)
- Time zone: UTC+1 (CET)
  - Summer (DST): UTC+2 (CEST)
- Postal code: 9613 (Note: The actual postcodes for Meerstad are much more chaotic. See reference.)
- Dialing code: 050
- Website: meerstad.eu

Meerstad is a planned town in the Dutch province of Groningen. It started in 2007 as part of the municipality of Slochteren, but was transferred to the city of Groningen in 2017. The original plan was to build 10,000 houses for 30,000 people by 2026, but has been revised to 6,000 houses by 2035.

== History ==
In March 2005, the municipal council of Slochteren approved the master plan of Meerstad. The name is a combination of meer (lake) and stad (city), and was planned to become a suburban planned town with 10,000 houses for 30,000 people by 2026. The town would be built on a 2,300 hectares (5,700 acres) area, and would cater to middle income families. In 2006, the construction of the central lake started, and in 2008, the first houses were built. Slochteren would be responsible, however it would be built in cooperation with the city of Groningen.

The initial plans were too optimistic. In 2010, there were supposed to be 3,000 houses in Meerstad, but in 2014, less than 200 had been built. The numbers were revised down to 6,000 houses by 2035. In 2011, there were rumours that Slochteren wanted to transfer ownership to the city of Groningen, however both municipalities neither confirmed nor denied the rumours. In 2015, it was announced that Meerstad would be transferred to the city of Groningen effective 1 January 2017. The villages of Harkstede and Lageland which were located within the Meerstad project would remain in Slochteren.

In 2021, the losses on the Meerstad project were in excess of €100 million, and the population was 2,595 people.

== Gallery ==
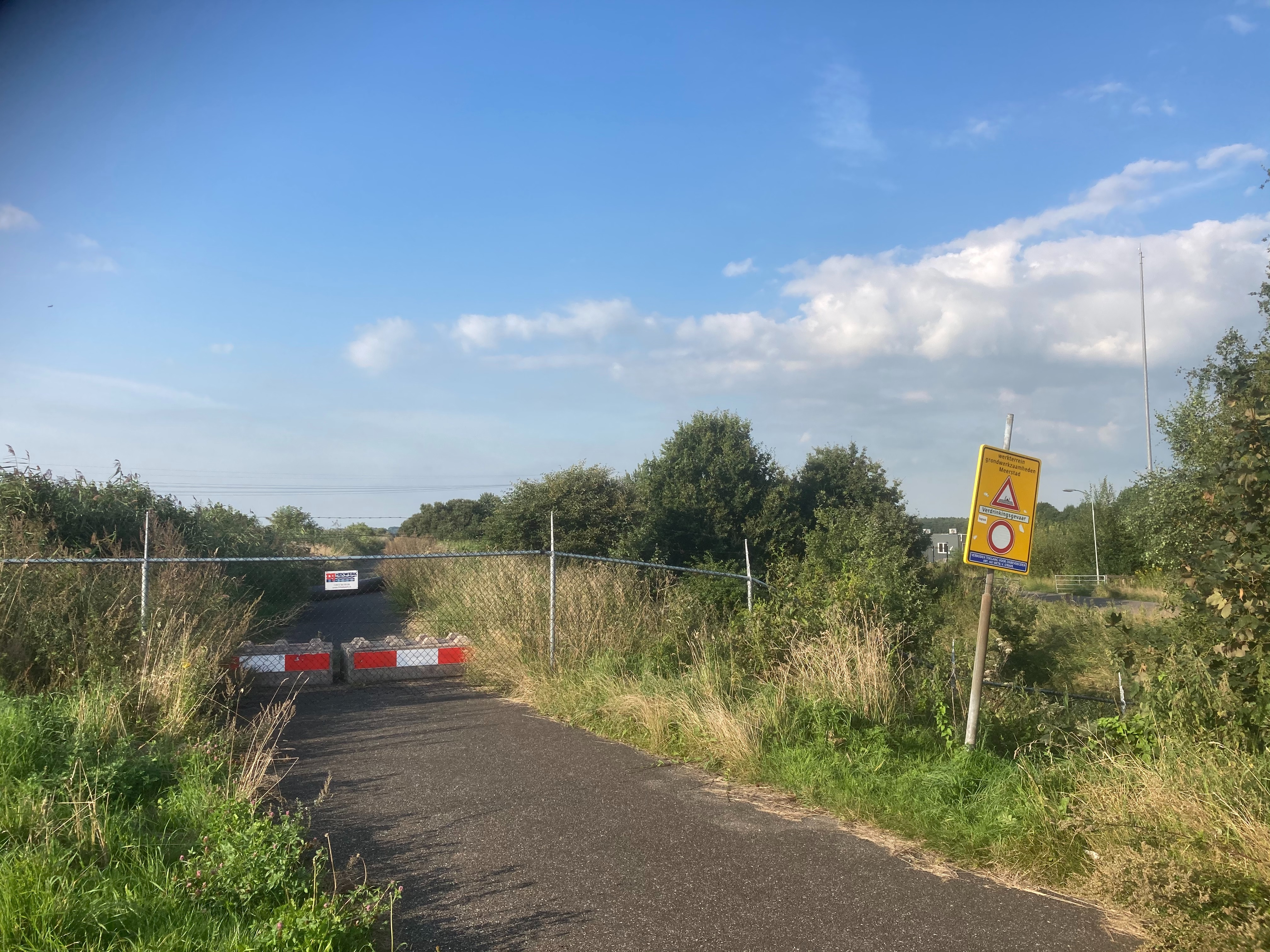
Gruno Park (2021)

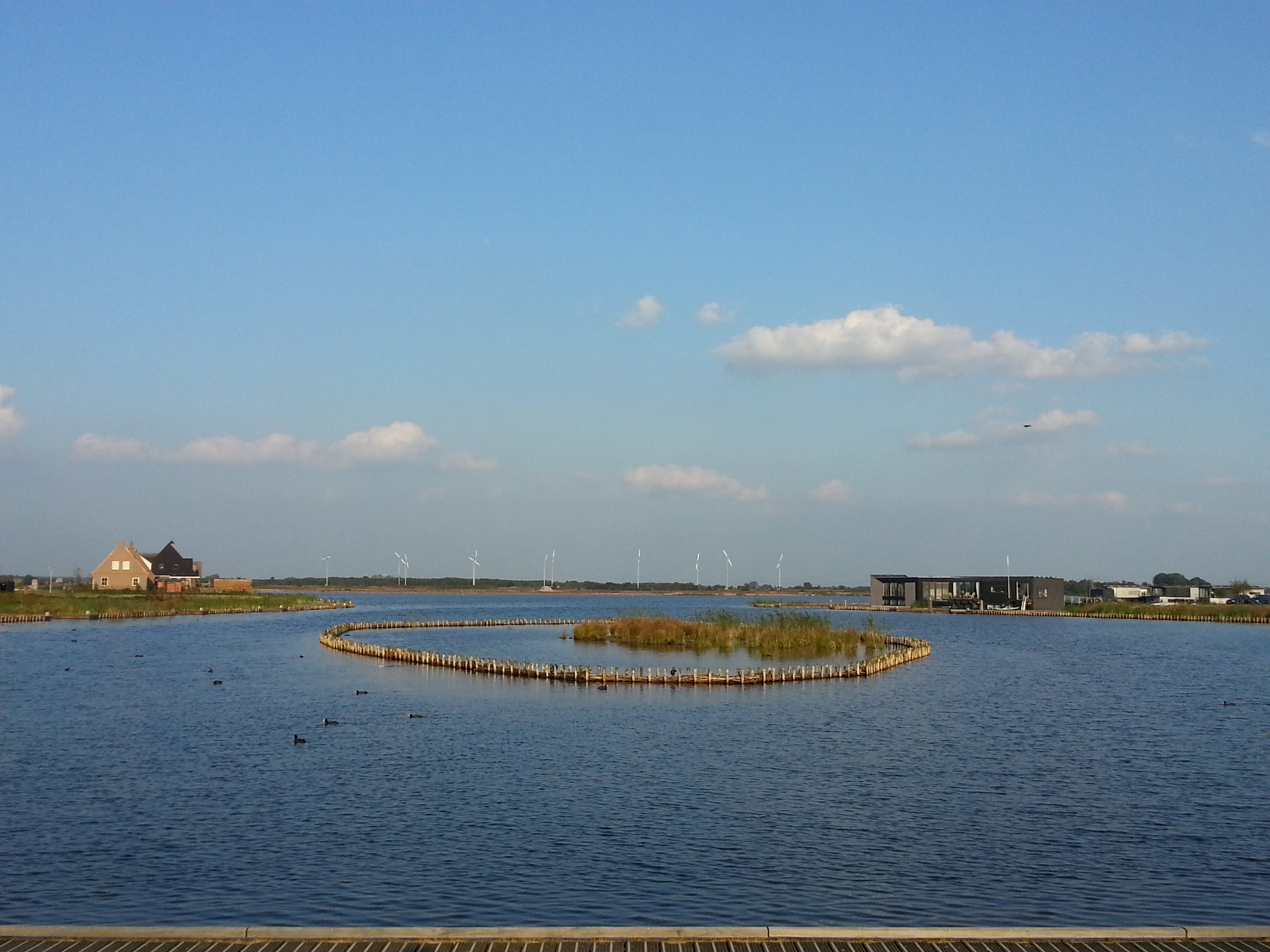
Buildings on the lake

== Bibliography ==
- Boersma, Jan Jacob (2005). "Meerstad Groningen" (in Dutch). Christen Unie Slochteren.
