= De Mûnts, Buitenpost =

Smock mill in Friesland, Netherlands

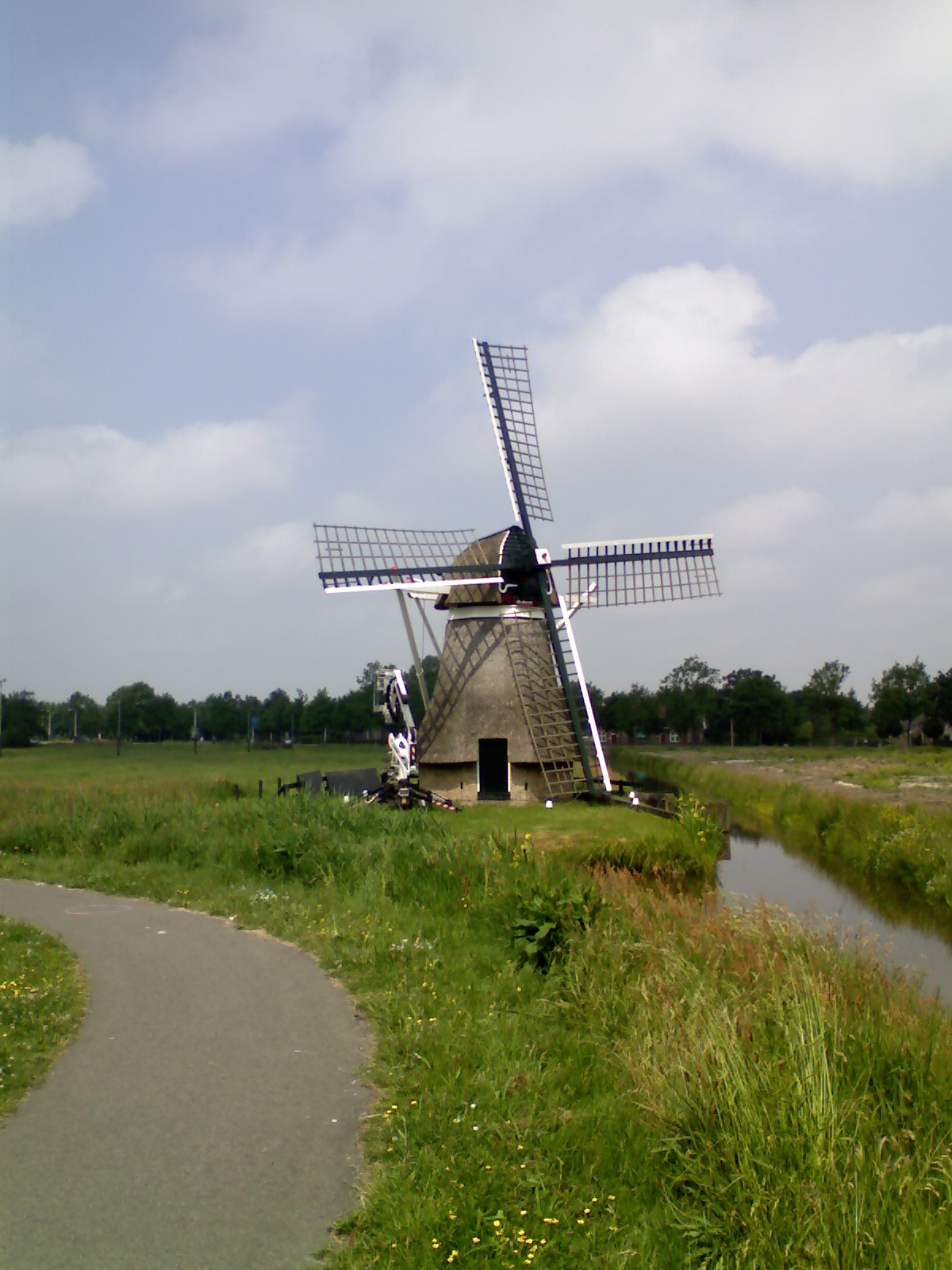
- De Mûnts, June 2008

Origin
- Mill name: De Mûnts
- Mill location: West 1A, 9285 WB Buitenpost
- Coordinates: 53°15′06″N 6°08′15″E
- Operator(s): Gemeente Achtkarspelen
- Year built: 1959

Information
- Purpose: Drainage mill
- Type: Smock mill
- Storeys: Three-storey smock
- Base storeys: Single-storey base
- Smock sides: Eight sides
- No. of sails: Four sails
- Type of sails: Common sails
- Windshaft: Wood
- Winding: Tailpole and winch
- Type of pump: Archimedes' screw

De Mûnts (English: The Monk) is a smock mill in Buitenpost, Friesland, Netherlands which has been restored to working order. The mill is listed as a Rijksmonument, number 7039.

== History ==
This mill was built in 1870 at Oosterhoogebrug, Groningen, where it drained the Borgsloterpolder in connection with the construction of the Eemskanal. It was demolished in 1952. In 1958, millwright A de Roos of Leeuwarden started to rebuild the mill at Buitenpost for Wolter O Bakker of Harkstede. This was completed in 1959. Repairs and restoration were carried out in 1963 and 1973. In 1985, the inner sailstock, which was made of wood, broke. It was replaced by an iron one by millwright Buurma of Oudeschans, Groningen. In 1990, the outer sailstock was also replaced with an iron on by Buurma. Further restoration work was carried out on the mill in 1994.

== Description ==
De Mûnts is a smock mill winded by a winch. There is no stage, the sails reaching almost to the ground. The mill has a single-storey brick base and a three-storey smock. The smock and cap are thatched. The four Common sails have a span of 13.40 metres (44 ft 0 in) and are carried in a wooden windshaft. The windshaft also carries the brake wheel, which has 37 cogs. This drives the wallower (19 cogs) at the top of the upright shaft. At the bottom of the upright shaft, the crown wheel (28 cogs) drives the wooden Archimedes' screw via a gear wheel with 29 cogs. The Archimedes' screw has an axle diameter of 210 millimetres (8¼ in) and is 650 millimetres (2 ft 2 in) diameter overall. It is inclined at an angle of 15°. Each revolution of the screw lifts 106 litres (23 imp gal) of water.

== Public access ==
De Mûnts is open to the public when the mill is working, or by appointment.
