= Protestant church of Buitenpost =

Coordinates: 53°15′06″N 6°08′41″E

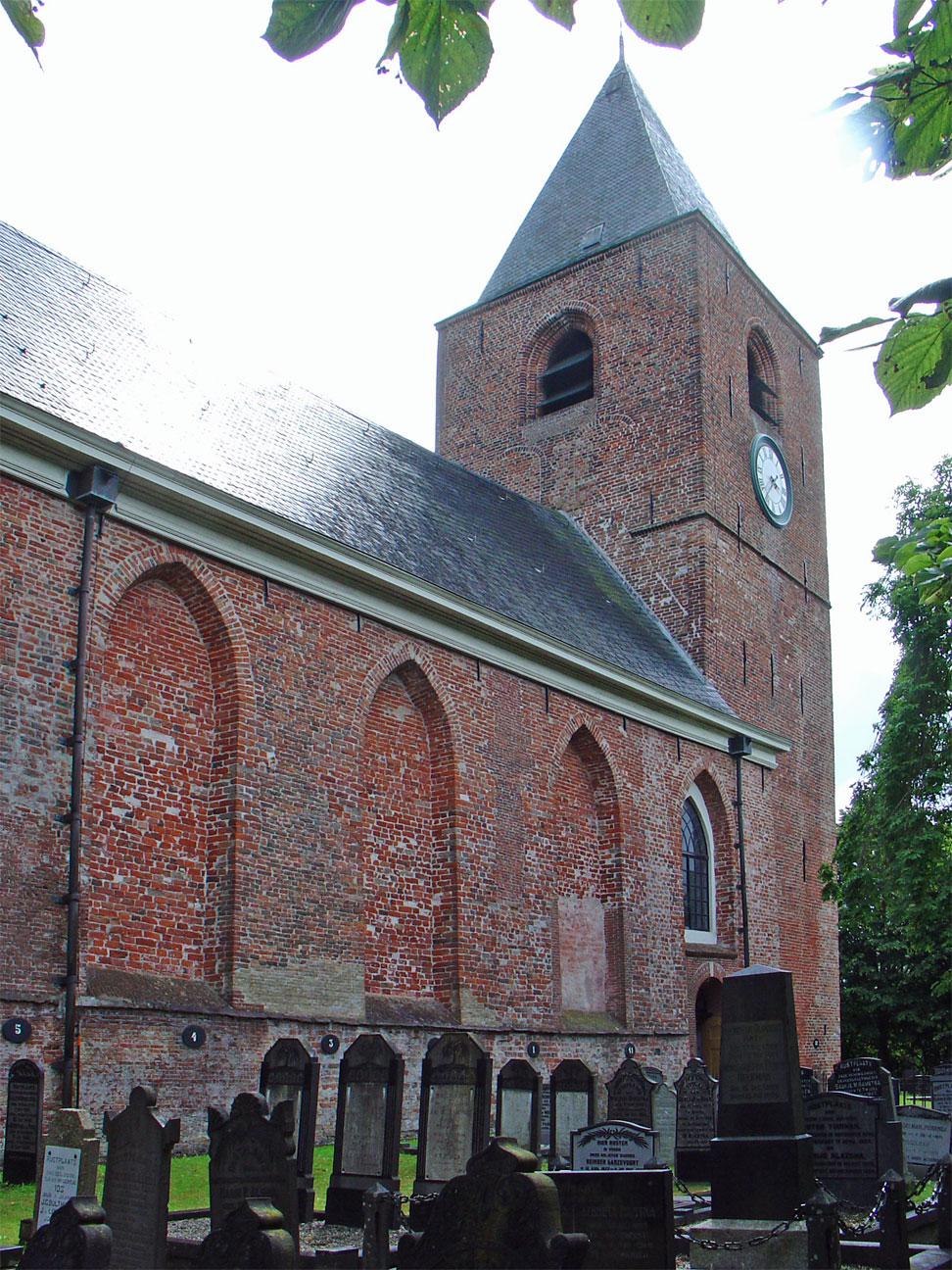
- Church of Buitenpost
- Protestant church of Buitenpost

Specifications
- Materials: Brick

The Protestant church of Buitenpost is a medieval religious building in Buitenpost, Friesland, in the Netherlands.

The late Gothic church with a quintuple closed choir was built in the late 15th century. The tower of the church is much older and dates from c. 1200 it was heightened in the 16th century and has a tented roof. The monumental pipe organ was built in 1877 by L. van Dam & Zn.

It was originally a Roman Catholic church, becoming a Protestant church after the Protestant Reformation. It is listed as a Rijksmonument, number 7036 and is rated with a very high historical value. The church is located on the Oude Havenstraat 1.
