= Harkstede =

- Village
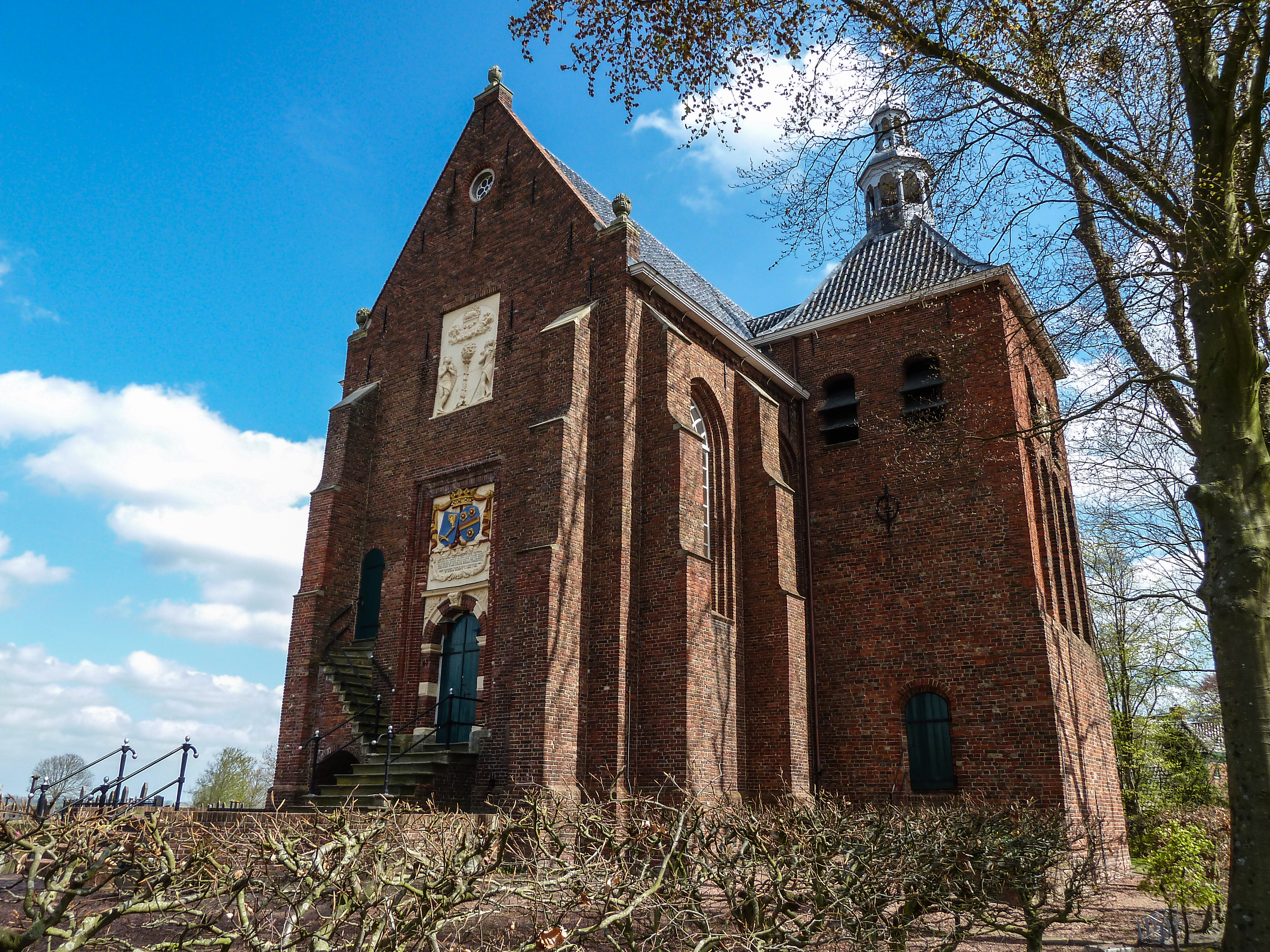
- The church was built in the late 17th century

- Location of Harkstede in the province of Groningen Harkstede (Netherlands)
- Coordinates: 53°13′55″N 6°42′52″E
- Country: Netherlands
- Province: Groningen
- Municipality: Midden-Groningen

Area
  - Total: 1.95 km^{2} (0.75 sq mi)

Population (2021)
  - Total: 3,025
  - Density: 1,550/km^{2} (4,020/sq mi)
- Time zone: UTC+1 (CET)
  - Summer (DST): UTC+2 (CEST)
- Postal code: 9617
- Dialing code: 050

Harkstede (Dutch pronunciation: [ˈɦɑr(ə)kˌsteːdə]; Gronings: Haarkstee [ˈɦaː(r)ksteɪ̯]) is a village in the northeastern Netherlands. It is located in Midden-Groningen, Groningen. Harkstede is located near the "Meerstad Project" of the municipality of Groningen, however, it is no longer part of the project.

== History ==
Harkstede was supposedly founded during the 13th century, when the tower next to the local church was built. The name is probably derived from "Arkes Stee", meaning "place for an ark = church". The present church was constructed between 1692 and 1700 on the foundations of the medieval church. Planned by Henric Piccardt (1636-1712), lord of the manors of Klein Martijn at Harkstede and the Fraeylemaborg at Slochteren, it was built by two master craftsmen from the city of Groningen, Henric Coeur and Geert van der Aa.

Until 1821, Harkstede was an independent municipality. That year it was annexed by Slochteren. Harkstede was planned to be part of the Meerstad project. The project was transferred to Groningen in 2017, and the village remained in Slochteren. The border correction has resulted in enclaves.

== Sightseeing ==
Attractions include the recreation park "Gruno Park" and the international rowing course to the north of the village. For waterski enthusiasts, there is the Gruno Lake and Beach including a possibility for water skiing and ski jumping. Once Meerstad has been completed, water recreation will further increase.
