= Buitenpost =

Buitenpost Bûtenpost (West Frisian)
- Village
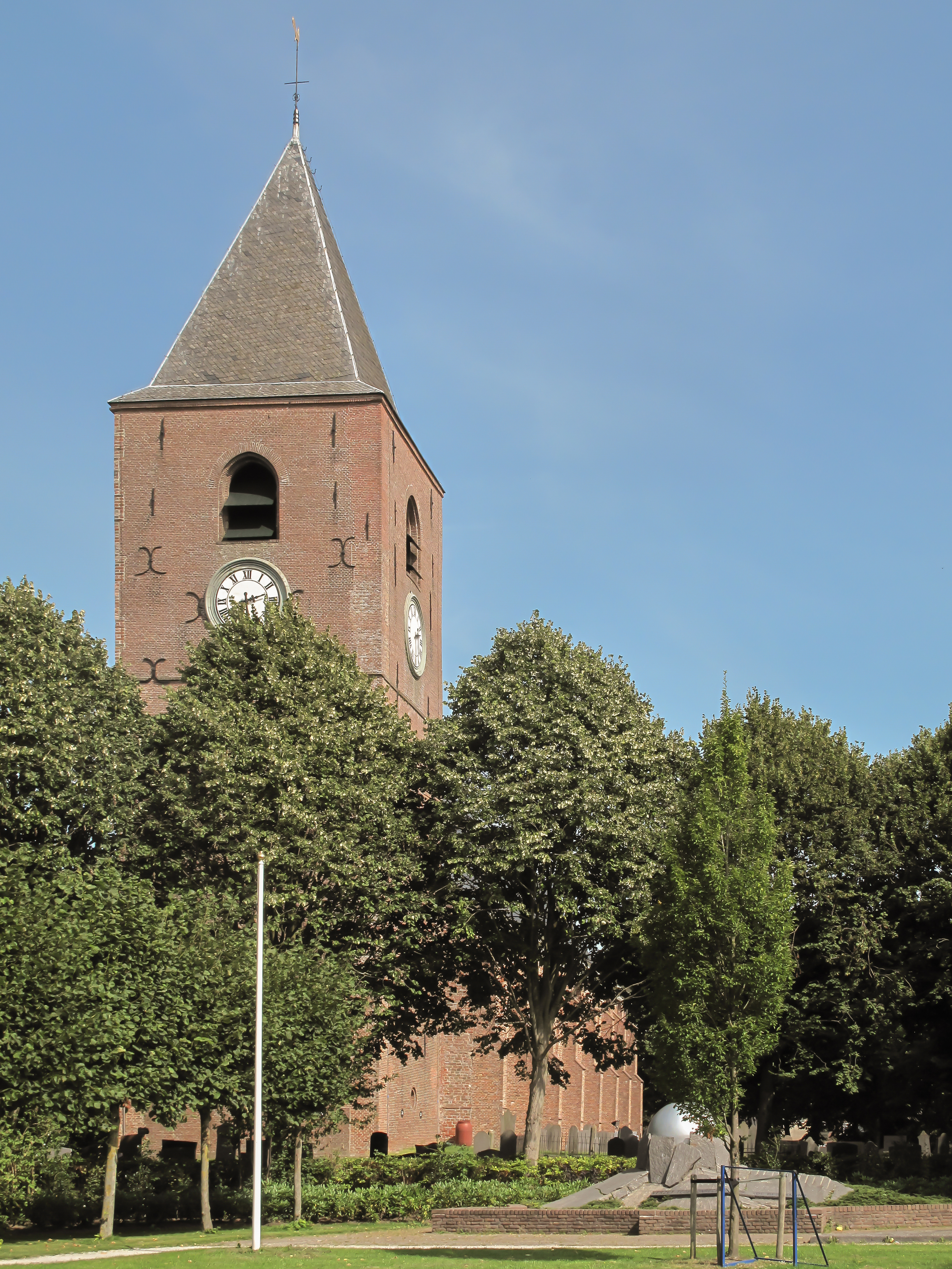
- Maria Church

- Flag Coat of arms

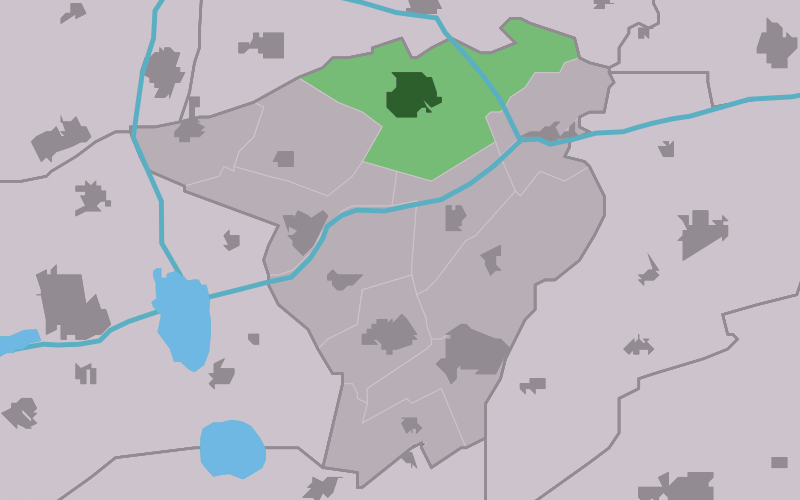
- Location in Achtkarspelen municipality

- Location in the Netherlands
- Country: Netherlands
- Province: Friesland
- Municipality: Achtkarspelen

Area
  - Total: 18.55 km^{2} (7.16 sq mi)
- Elevation: 0.1 m (0.33 ft)

Population (2021)
  - Total: 5,770
  - Density: 311/km^{2} (806/sq mi)
- Time zone: UTC+1 (CET)
  - Summer (DST): UTC+2 (CEST)
- Postal code: 9285
- Dialing code: 0511-0512
- Website: Official

Buitenpost (Bûtenpost in West Frisian) is a village in north-east Friesland in the Netherlands.

It lies approximately halfway between the cities of Leeuwarden (the capital of Friesland) and Groningen, in the northern part of the municipality of Achtkarspelen. With 5,762 inhabitants, Buitenpost is the second largest settlement in the municipality.

Buitenpost is home to the Netherlands' largest botanical herbal garden.

== History ==
The village was first mentioned in 1388 as Post, and means outside bridge. Buiten (outside) was added to distinguish from the hamlet of Lutkepost. Buitenpost is a road village which developed along the main road from Leeuwarden to Groningen, and became the capital of the grietenij (predecessor of a municipality) Achtkarspelen.

The tower of the Protestant church was constructed around 1200 and enlarged in the 16th century. The church dates from the 15th century, but was damaged in a fire in 1594, and restored between 1611 and 1613. There were two stinses (villas) near Buitenpost: Herbrandastate which was demolished in 1780 and Haersmastate which was demolished around 1910. In 1840, it was home to 882 people.

In 1866, Buitenpost railway station was opened in the village. Wind mill De Mûnts is a polder mill constructed in 1871. Its purpose was to remove the excess water from the low-lying polder. The mill was located in Oosterhoogebrug, Groningen, and was needed for the construction of the Eems Canal. On 7 July 1952, it was scheduled for demolition, but was bought by Wolter Bakker and moved to Buitenpost to replace an engine powered pumping station.

== Notable buildings ==
- The Protestant church of Buitenpost

== Gallery ==
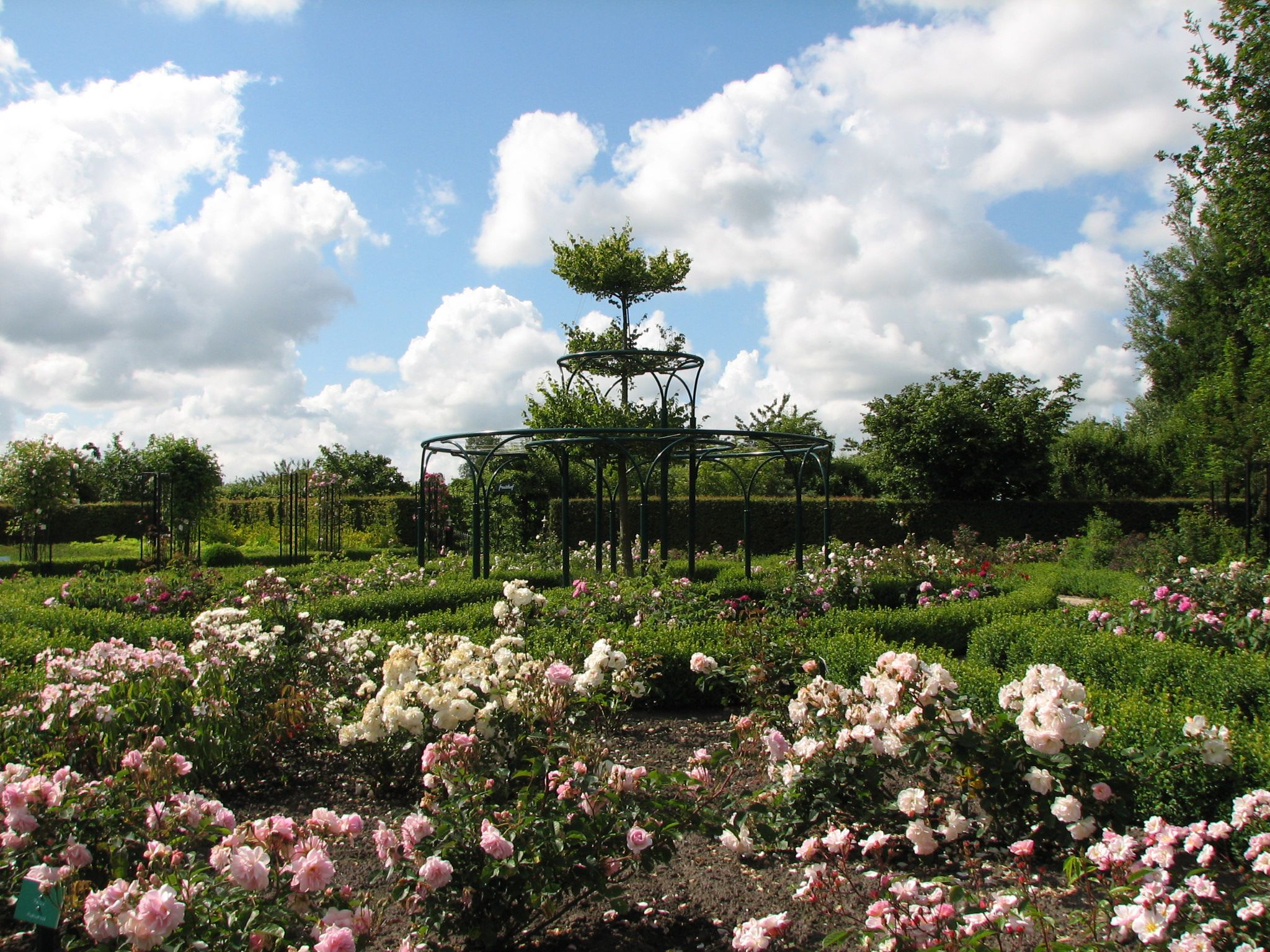
Rosarium in the Botanische Tuin De Kruidhof

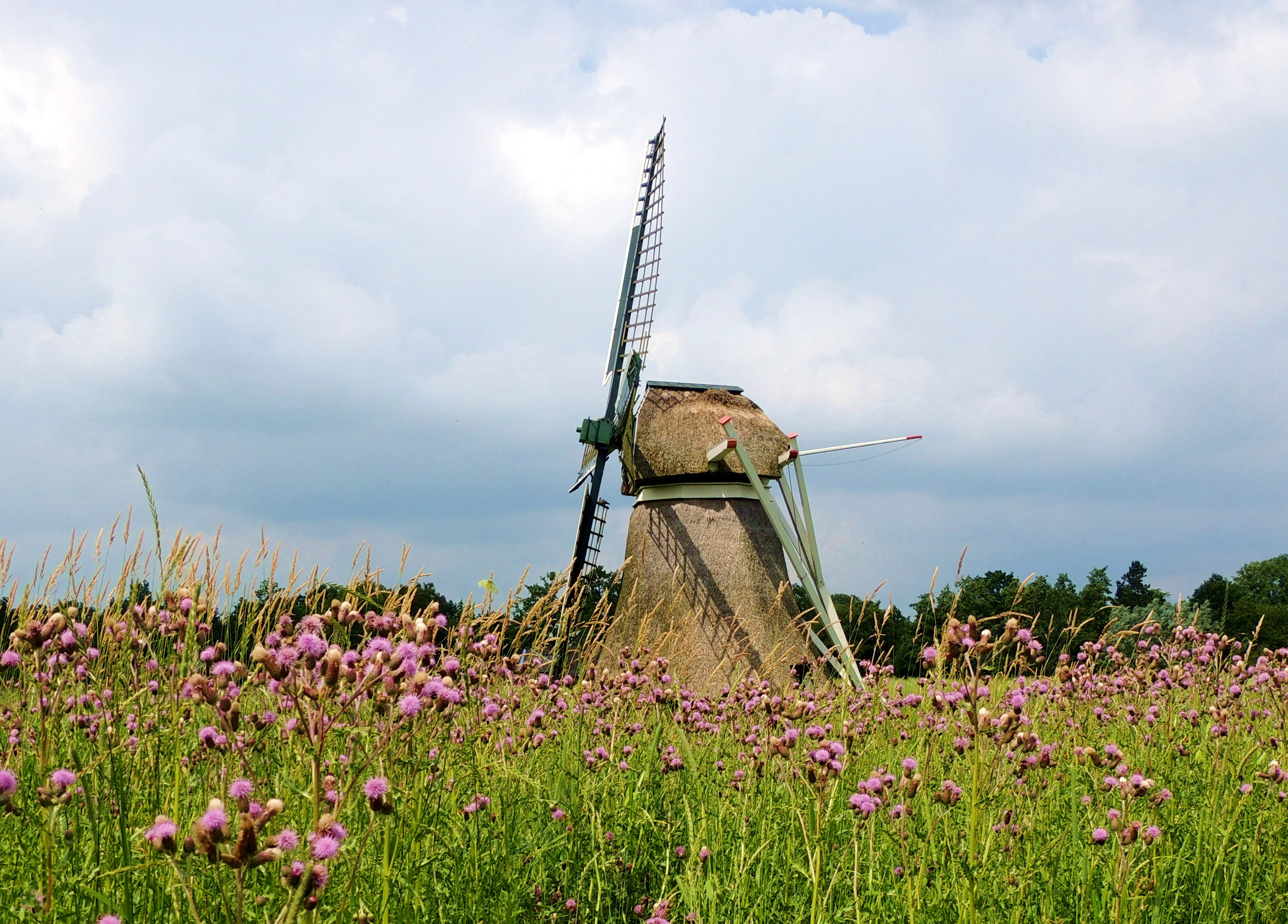
De Mûnts, Buitenpost

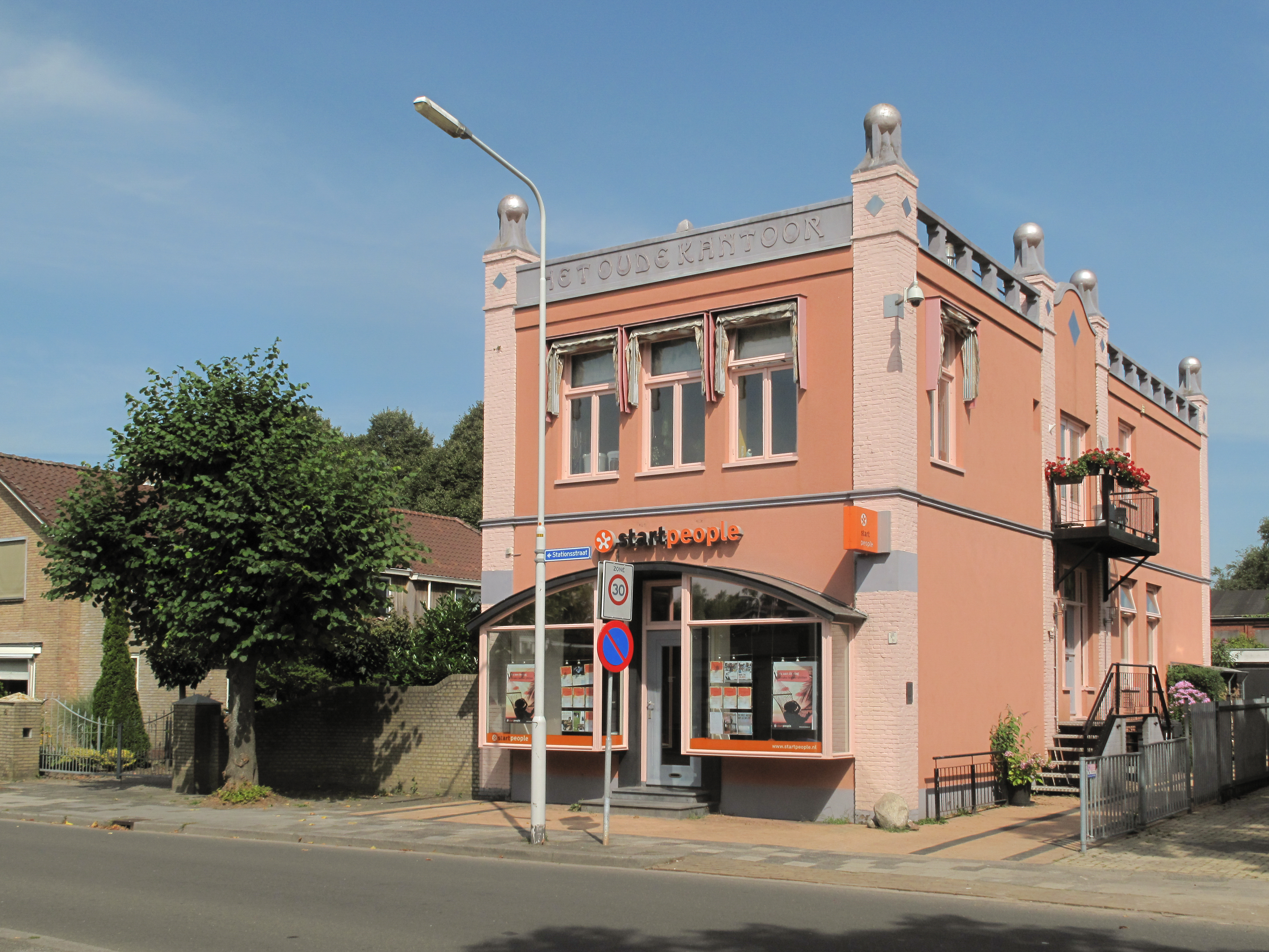
Employment agency in monumental building

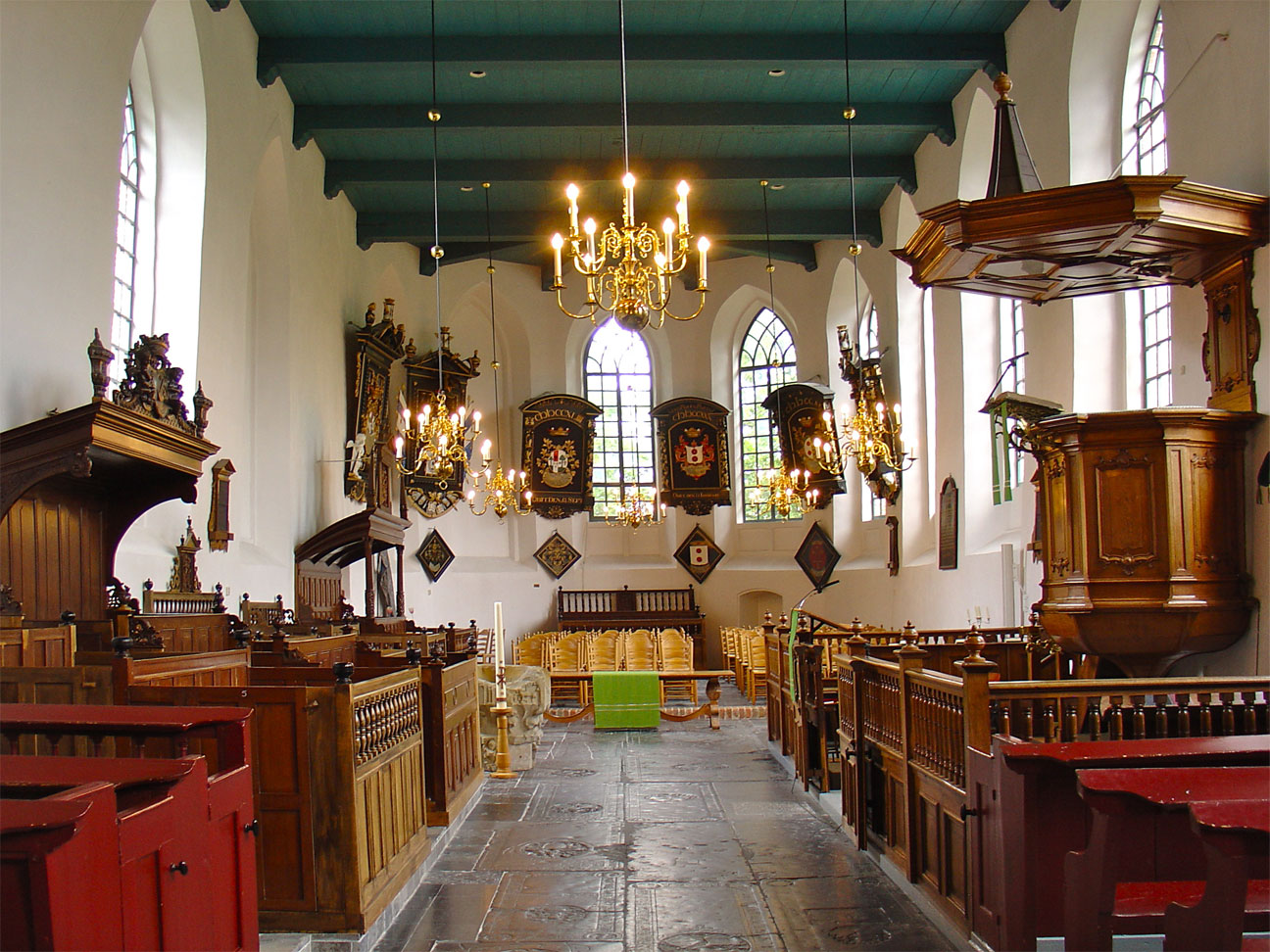
Church interior (Buitenpost)

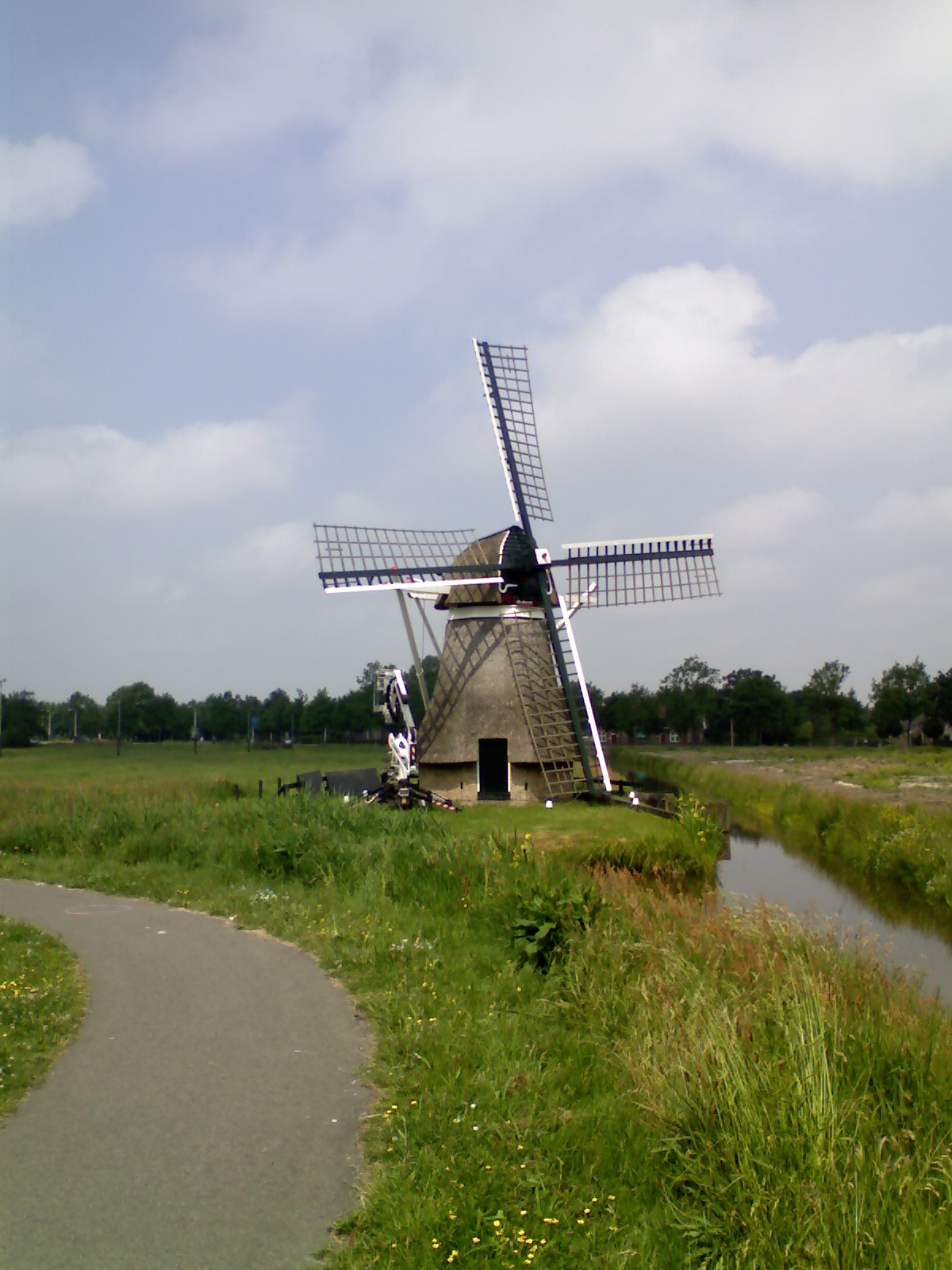
Windmill (Buitenpost)

== Transportation ==
- Buitenpost railway station
