= Schildwolde =

- Village
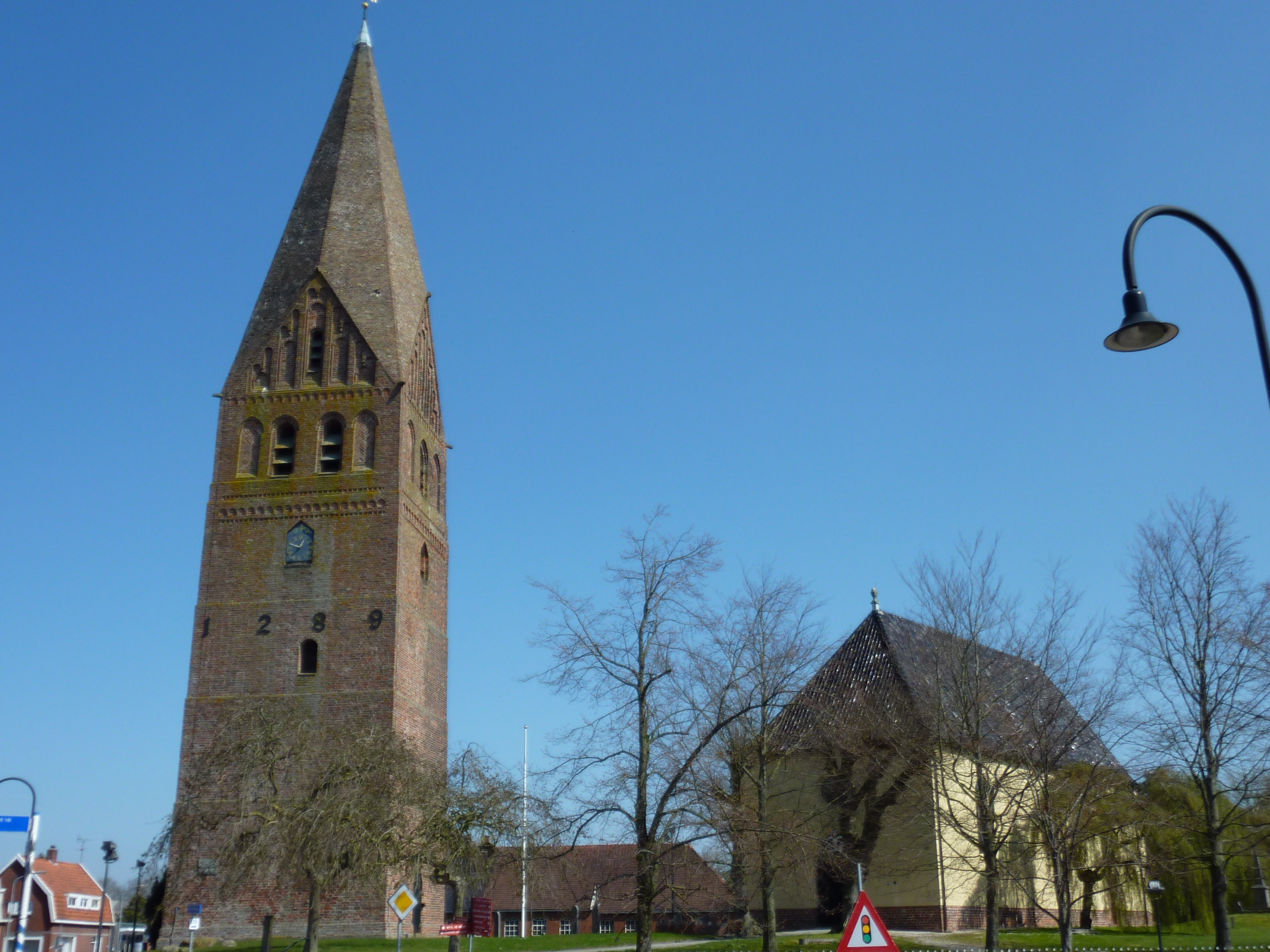
- Church tower at Schildwolde

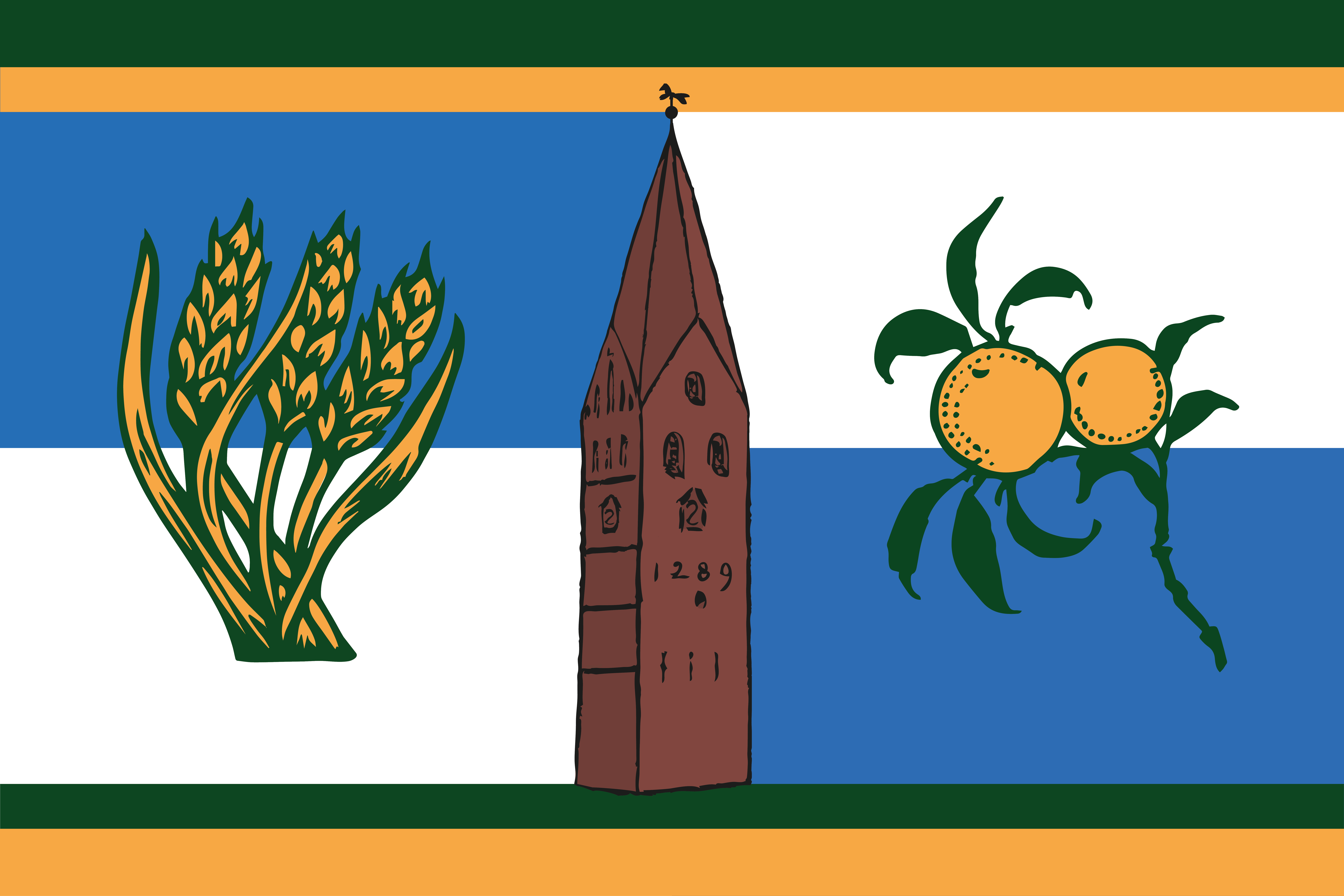
- Flag

- Location in province of Groningen in the Netherlands Schildwolde (Netherlands)
- Coordinates: 53.2324°N 6.8140°E
- Country: Netherlands
- Province: Groningen
- Municipality: Midden-Groningen

Area
  - Total: 17.80 km^{2} (6.87 sq mi)
- Elevation: 0 m (0 ft)

Population (2021)
  - Total: 1,685
  - Density: 94.66/km^{2} (245.2/sq mi)
- Time zone: UTC+1 (CET)
  - Summer (DST): UTC+2 (CEST)
- Postal code: 9626
- Dialing code: 0598

Schildwolde (Gronings: Schewôl) is a village in the Dutch province of Groningen. It is part of the municipality of Midden-Groningen. It is known for its detached church tower from the 13th century.

== History ==
Schildwolde was first mentioned in the 10th or 11th century as Scelduualda. The origin of the name is unclear and probably means swampy forest. In 1204, the Premonstratensian monastery of Gratiae Sanctae Mariae was founded in Schildwolde. It was originally a double monastery for monks and nuns. Later, only the convent remained. In 1223 or 1224, there was a dispute between the monastery of Schildwolde and the monastery of Wittewierum, and angry peasants burned down the monastery and church, but the tower remained standing.

The current tower displays 1289 as its year of construction, however it contains older parts, and the year was probably added during a 1829 reconstruction. The tower is 55 metres (180 ft) tall, and has a 9 metres (30 ft) square base. The convent was destroyed in 1594. In 1686, a Dutch Reformed Church was built next to the tower, however the two buildings are detached. Every year, from 20:00 on 31 December until 08:00 on 1 January, the bells in the tower are rung continuously to chase away evil spirits. On the night of 1964 to 1965, one of the bells was torn after 12 hours of service, and had to be repaired.

In 1909, Schildwolde had a population of 897 people and was part of the municipality of Slochteren. Between 1929 and 1941, there was a joint railway station with Hellum in Schildwolde on the line to Weiwerd. In 2017, it became part of the municipality of Midden-Groningen.

== Notable people ==
- Hendrik Goeman Borgesius (1847–1917), politician and former Speaker of the House of Representatives

== Gallery ==
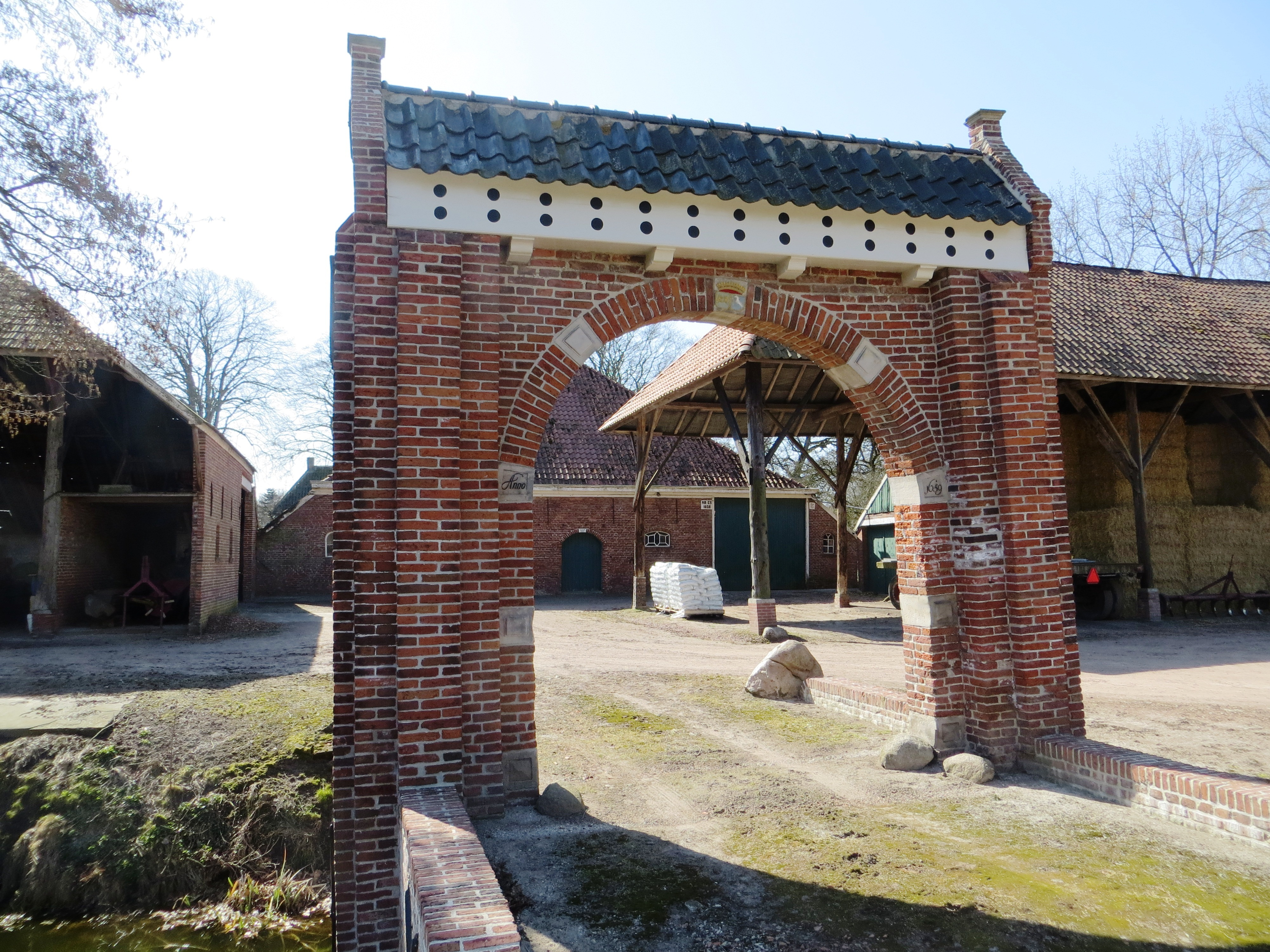
Gate to a farm from 1695

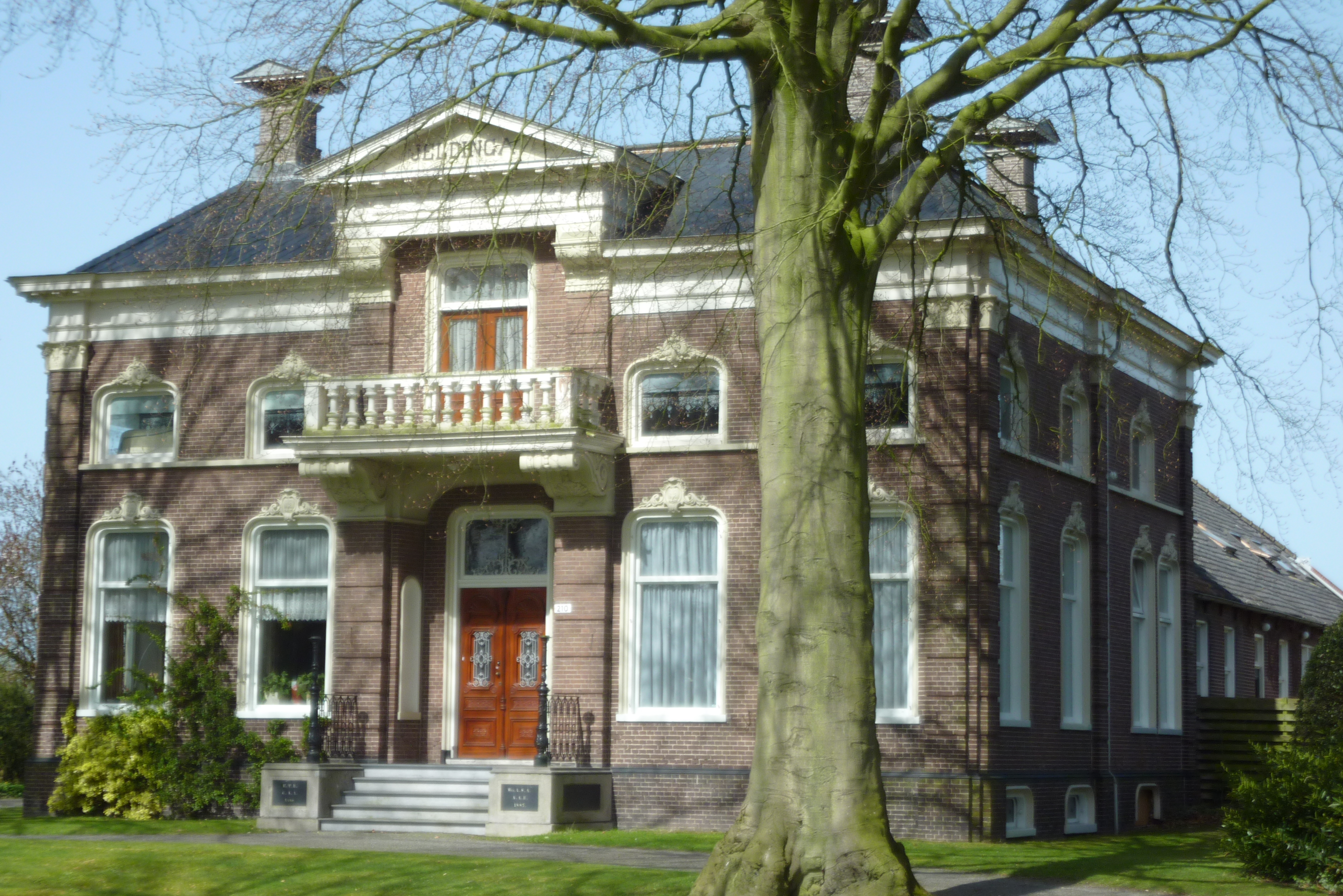
House of Jeldinga

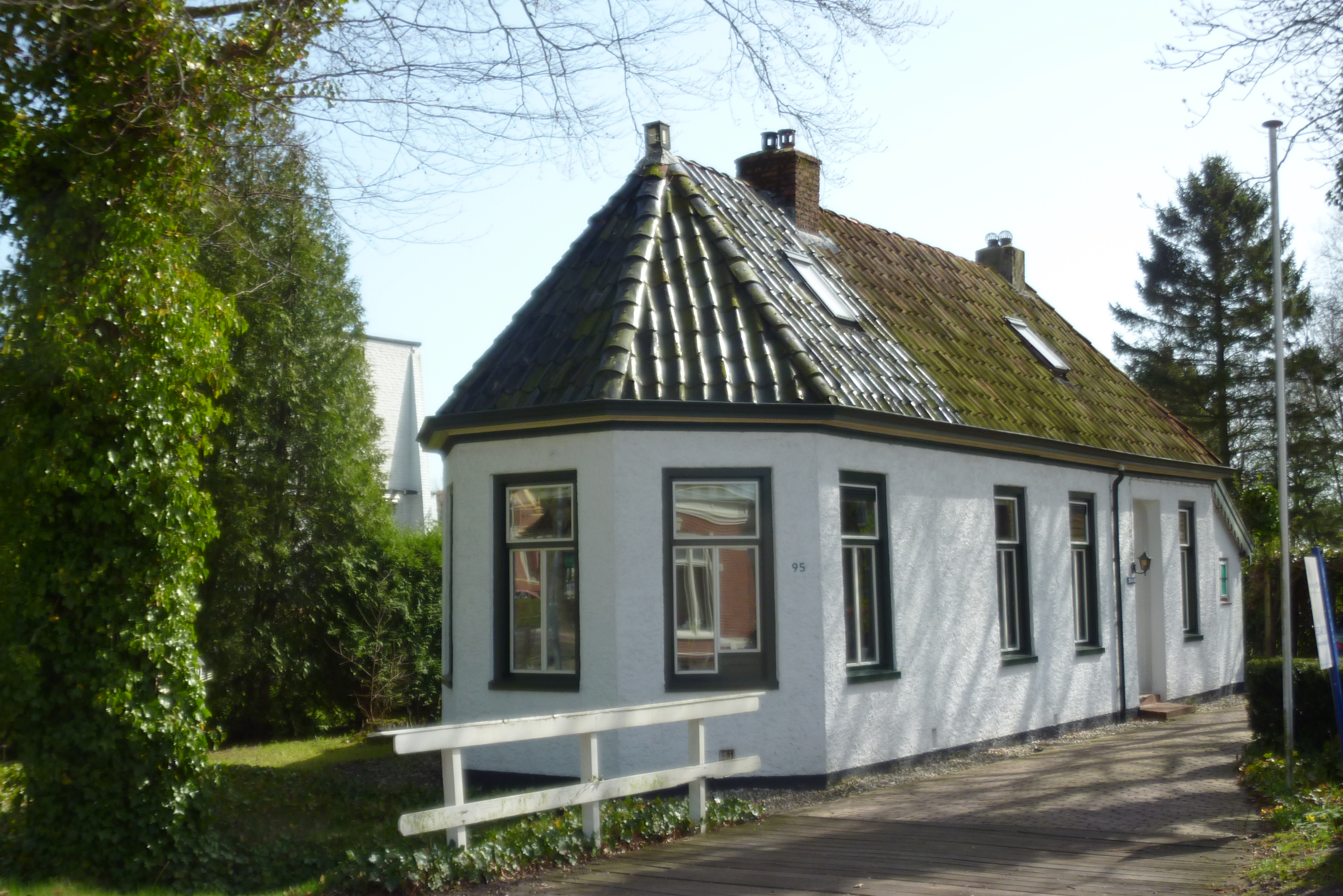
Toll house
