= Fraeylemaborg =

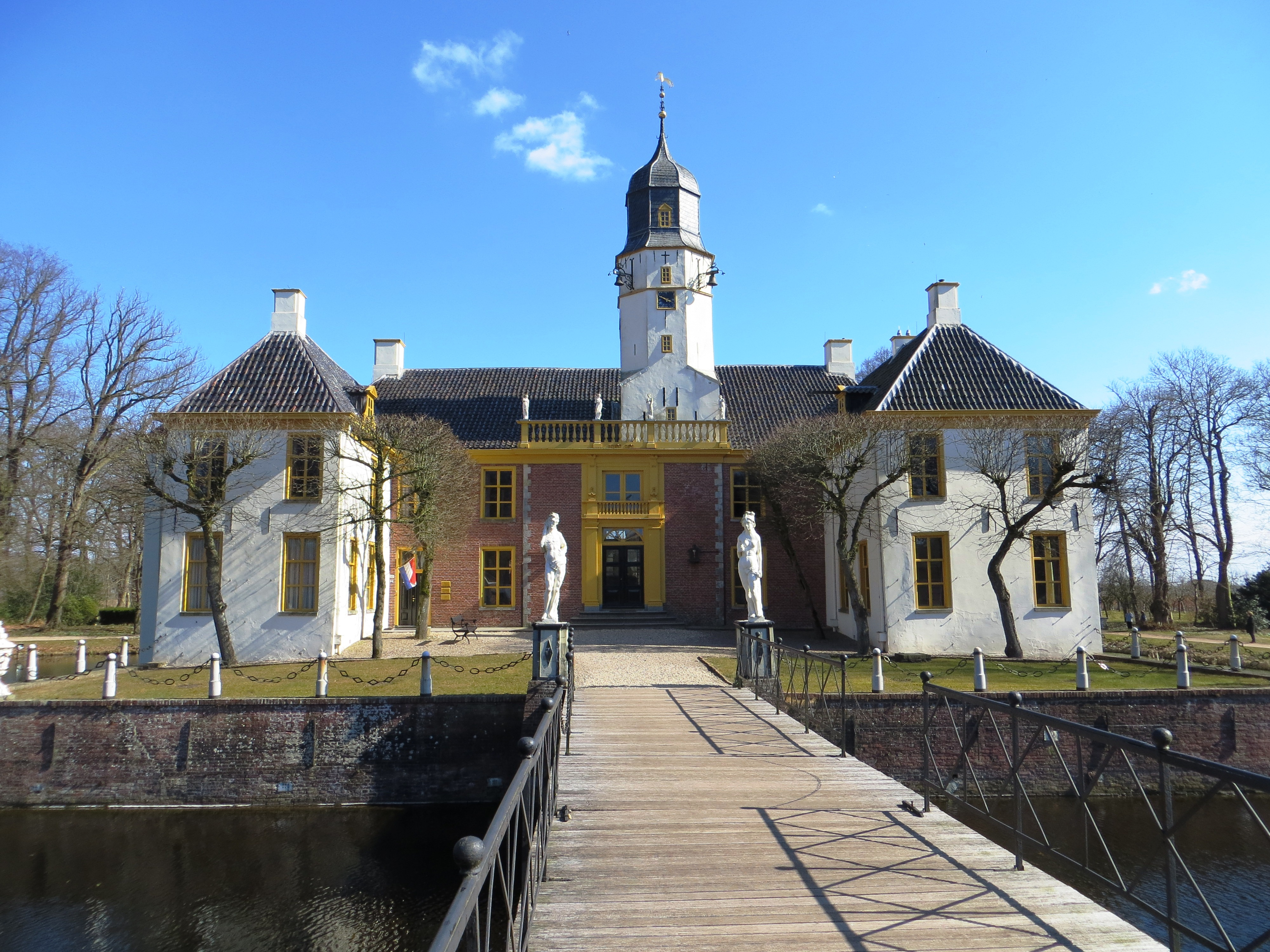
- The Fraeylemaborg in 2013

- Location of the museum in the province of Groningen
- Location: Hoofdweg 30; Slochteren, Netherlands
- Coordinates: 53.2154°N 6.8096°E
- Type: Historic house museum
- Visitors: 31,509 (2014)
- Director: Marjon Edzes-Posthumus
- Curator: Henny van Harten-Boers
- Website: www.fraeylemaborg.nl

The Fraeylemaborg (Dutch pronunciation: [ˈfraːiləmaːˌbɔr(ə)x]) is a borg in the village of Slochteren in the Netherlands. At present the Fraeylemaborg is a historic house museum. The museum had 31,509 visitors in 2013.

== Building history ==
Fraeylemaborg is the most important of the borgen in the province of Groningen. These strong houses or keeps were built in the Middle Ages to store harvests and to protect their produce from robbers. Besides churches, these structures were the only buildings that used durable stone and masonry. In due time they grew to become centres of power and wealth. The Fraeylemaborg is located in the middle of the town of Slochteren which upon its discovery in 1959 gave its name to the largest gasfield in the world.

In 1475, there was already a farm with the name Frealemaheerd. In the archives of 1504, the name is found of one Remmer Fraeylema. The building originates from the 16th century. The left wing was built in the 17th century. In 1680, the borg was sold by Evert Rengers, son of the former lord of the manor, because of his family debts. It was bought by Henric Piccardt (married to Anna Elizabeth Rengers, Evert's sister), who borrowed the necessary funds from Stadtholder William III. Piccardt extensively rebuilt the borg and he also landscaped a huge formal garden in the style of Louis XIV's France. After Piccardt's death the borg fell into disrepair. In 1781, the Fraeylemaborg was sold to Hendrik de Sandra Veldman. He rebuilt it into the shape it has today. Among his innovations was the removal of two towers which had graced the front square.

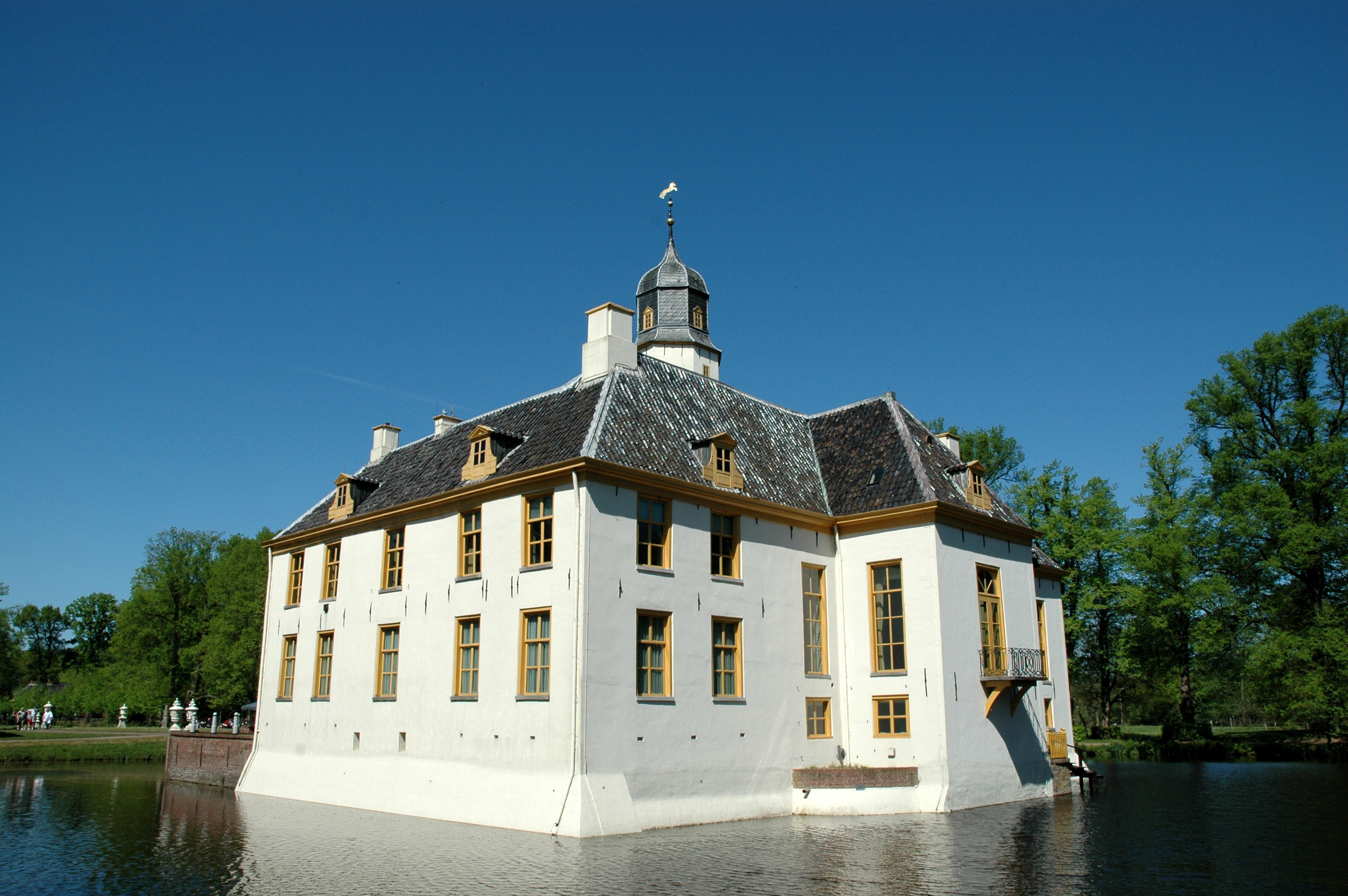
Rear of the borg

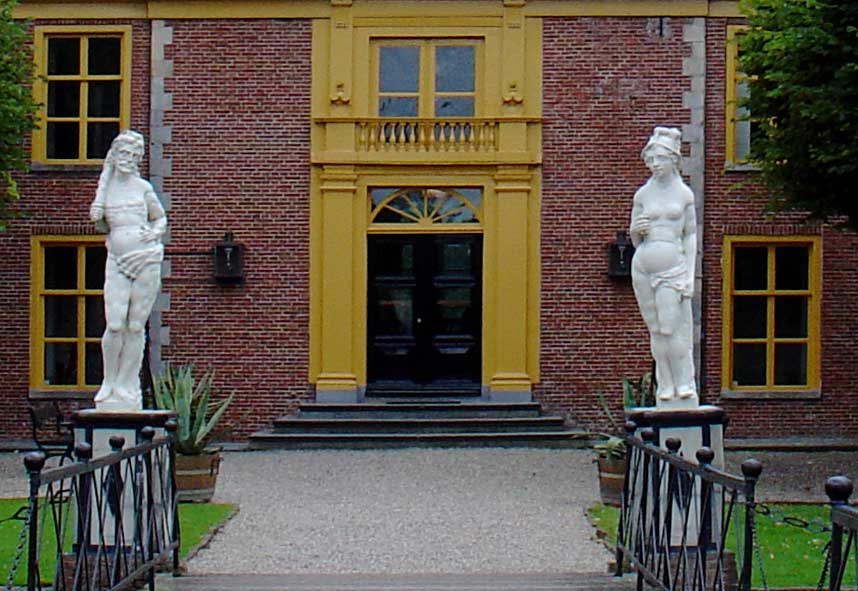
Heracles & Pallas Athene

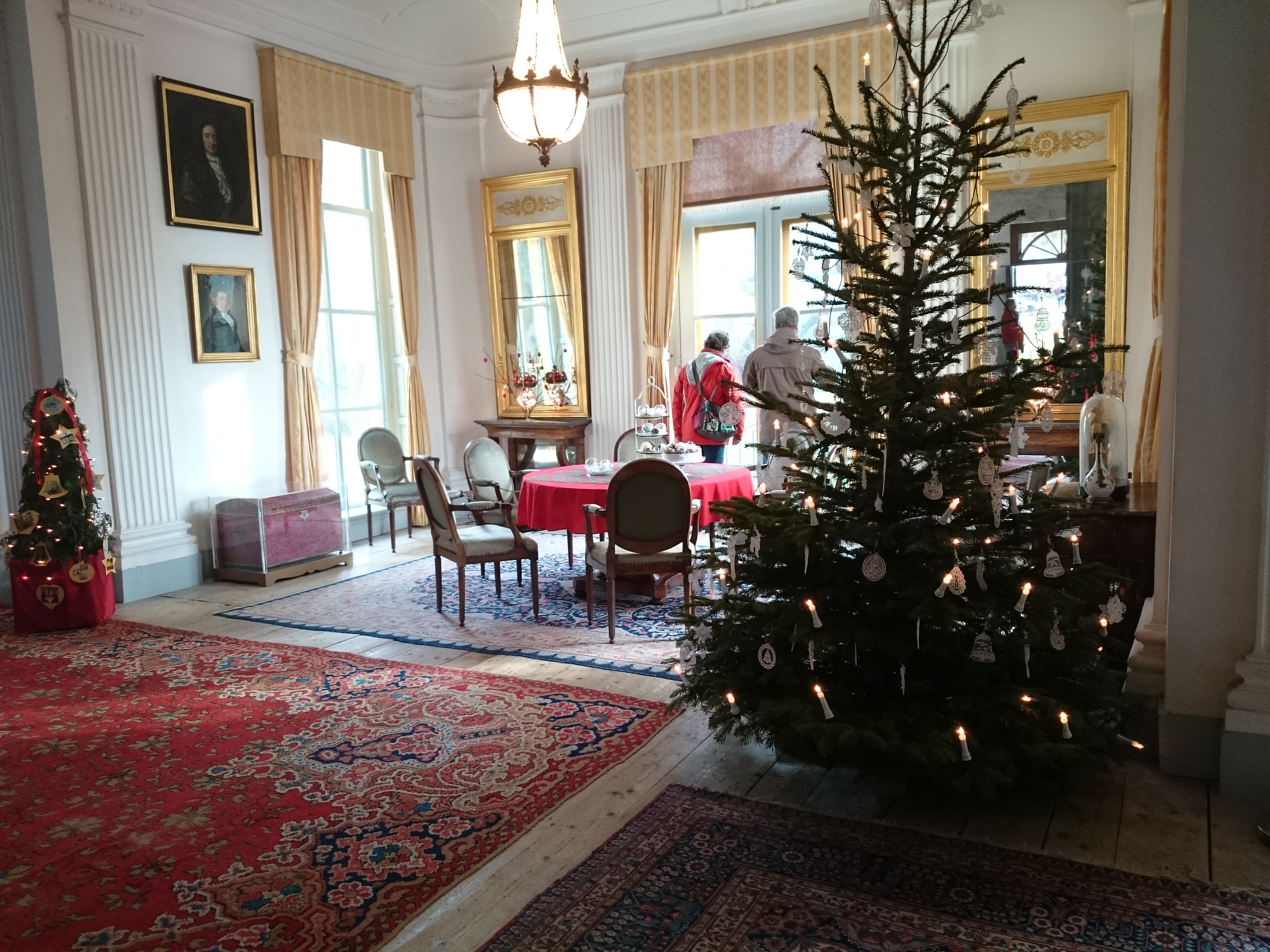
Big hall during Christmas time

== Garden ==
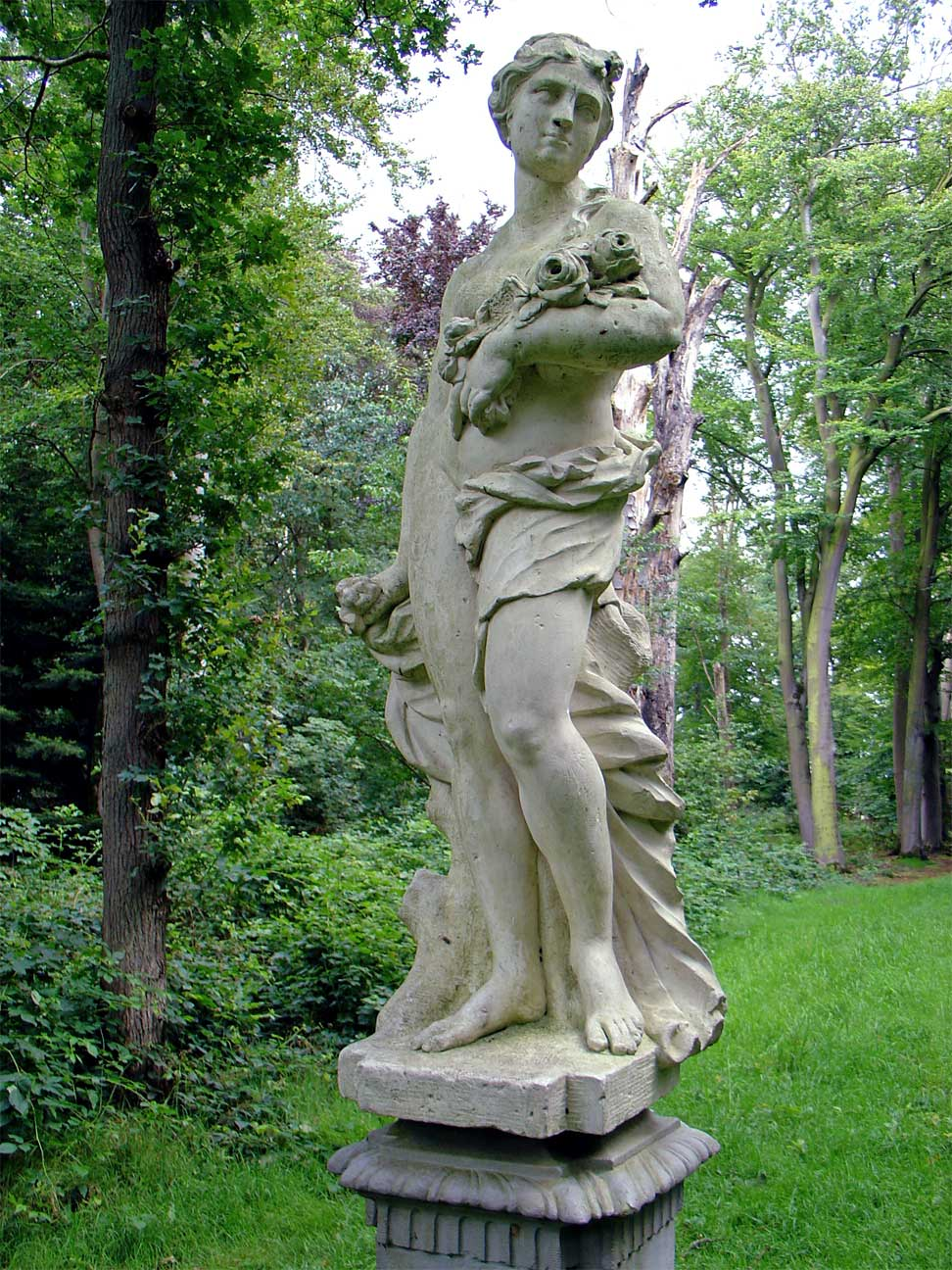
Garden

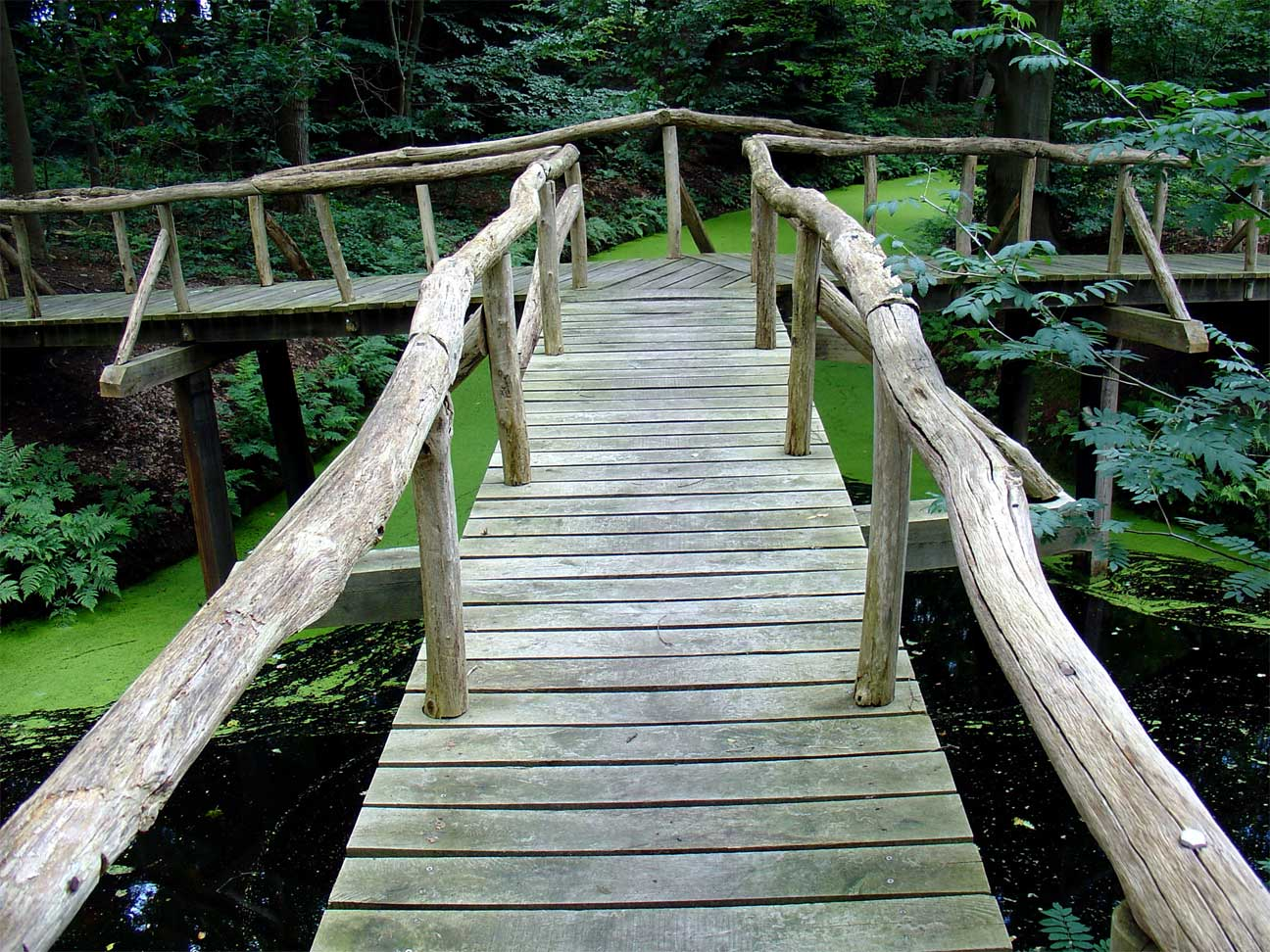
Garden

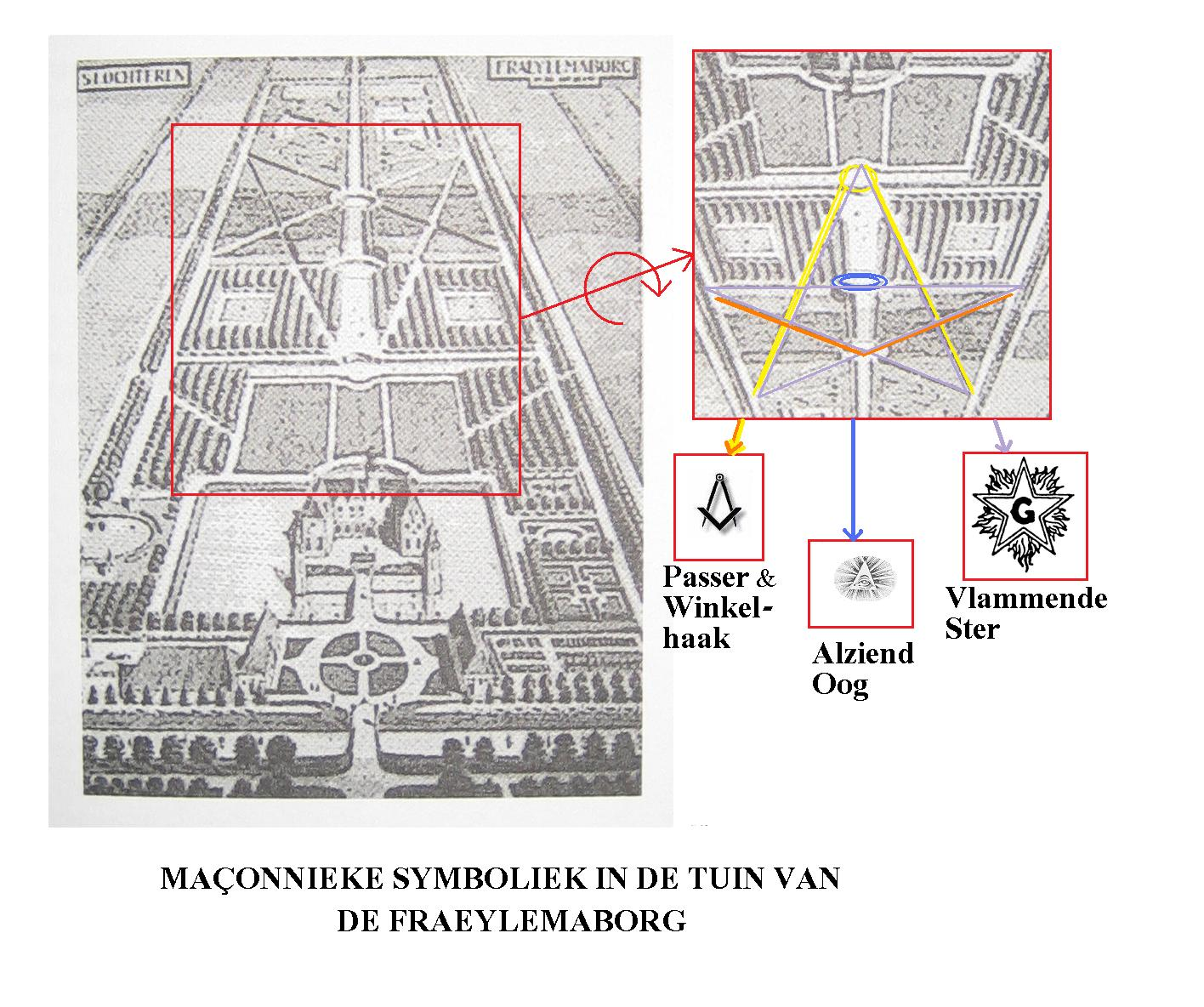
Masonry

== Administration ==
Year	Visitors	Year	Visitors
2005	21,500	2010	28,264
2006	31,322	2011	26,245
2007	27,528	2012	33,191
2008	27,305	2013	29,106
2009	26,862	2014	31,509

Marjon Edzes-Posthumus is the museum director and Henny van Harten-Boers is the curator of the Fraeylemaborg.

In the period 2006–14, the museum had between 26,245 and 33,191 visitors per year. The museum had 31,509 visitors in 2014. It is one of the most-visited museums in the province of Groningen.

The Fraeylemaborg is a member of Museumhuis Groningen (Groningen Museum House), which is an umbrella organization for museums and heritage institutions in the province of Groningen.
