= Slochteren =

- Village and former municipality
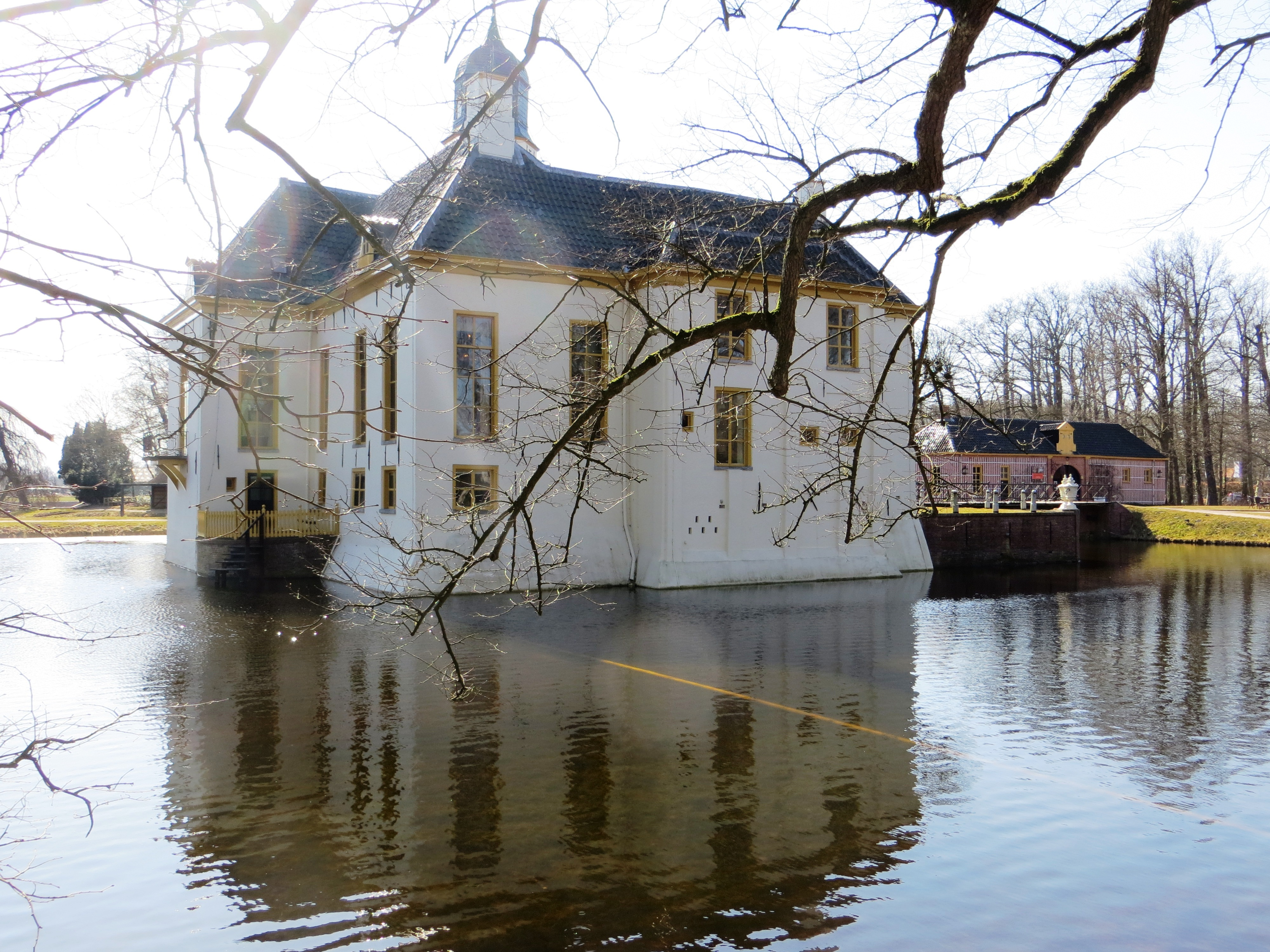
- Fraeylemaborg in Slochteren

- Flag Coat of arms

- Location in Groningen
- Coordinates: 53°13′N 6°48′E
- Country: Netherlands
- Province: Groningen
- Municipality: Midden-Groningen

Area
  - Total: 16.86 km^{2} (6.51 sq mi)
- Elevation: −1 m (−3.3 ft)

Population (2021)
  - Total: 2,140
  - Density: 127/km^{2} (329/sq mi)
- Demonym: Slochtenaar
- Time zone: UTC+1 (CET)
  - Summer (DST): UTC+2 (CEST)
- Postcode: 9621
- Area code: 0598

Slochteren (Dutch pronunciation: [ˈslɔxtərə(n)]) is a village and former municipality with a population of 15,546 in the province of Groningen in the northeast of the Netherlands. On 1 January 2018, Slochteren merged with Hoogezand-Sappemeer and Menterwolde, forming the municipality Midden-Groningen.

The former municipality can be characterized as a chain of small villages dividing a mostly agricultural polder landscape, and a connected string of mostly artificial wetlands and lakes called the 'Roegwold'. An area reclaimed from farmland not too long ago in an effort to bring back a piece of local landscape mimicking a time prior to human intervention, and in doing so also providing a resting place and breeding ground for bird populations. Having an agricultural background for at least a thousand years, besides farmers and farm workers, the community houses for the most part commuters to nearby towns like Hoogezand, Groningen and Delfzijl. The mansion, or 'borg', the Fraeylemaborg (A stronghold of the local land holding Groninger nobility) is also located in Slochteren, the oldest parts of which date back to the middle ages, and so does it's distinctly long and narrow, once privately owned, forest, 'Slochterbos', housing some of the provinces oldest trees, after most had been cut down by ancient settlers.

== Geography ==
The population centres in the former municipality are:

- Denemarken
- Froombosch
- Harkstede
- Hellum
- Kolham
- Lageland
- Luddeweer
- Overschild
- Schaaphok
- Scharmer
- Schildwolde
- Siddeburen
- Slochteren
- Steendam
- Tjuchem
- Woudbloem

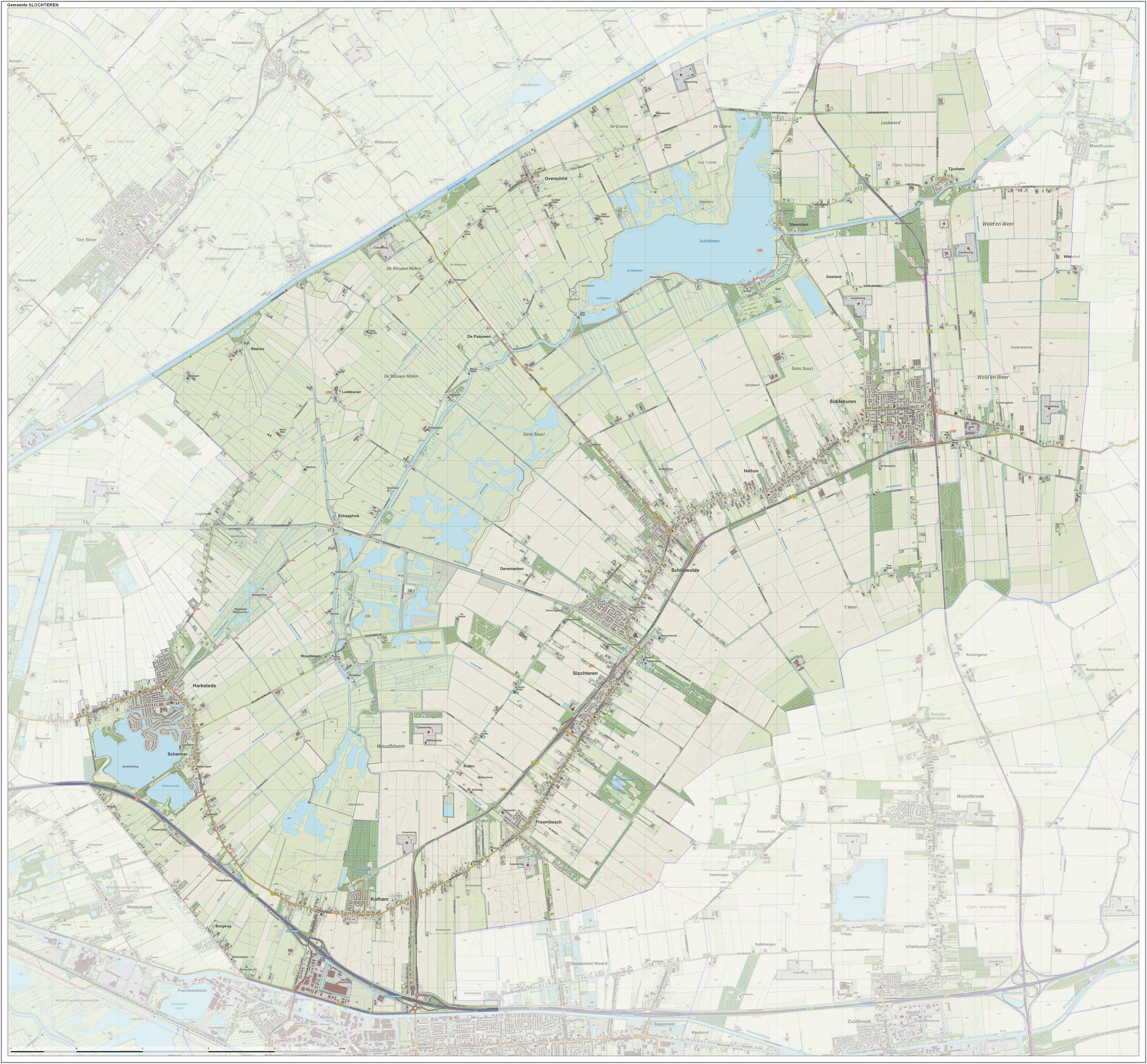

Topographic map of the municipality of Slochteren, June 2015

== Natural gas field ==
Slochteren is in the center of the giant Groningen gas field, discovered in 1959, ensuring the position of the Netherlands as a major energy exporting country. The estimated gas reserves in 2009 were 2,700 km^{3} (650 cu mi).

== Gallery ==
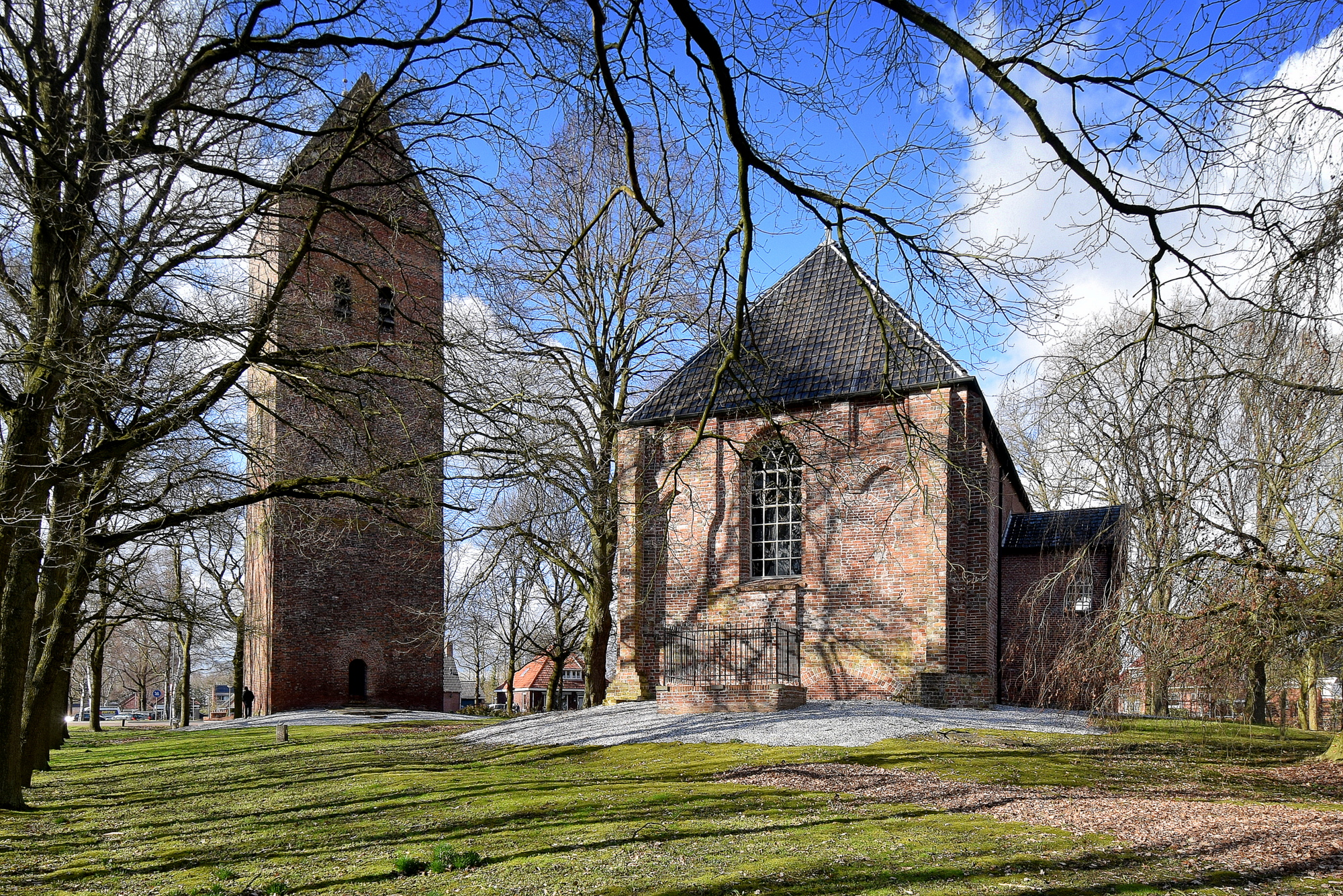
Protestant Church

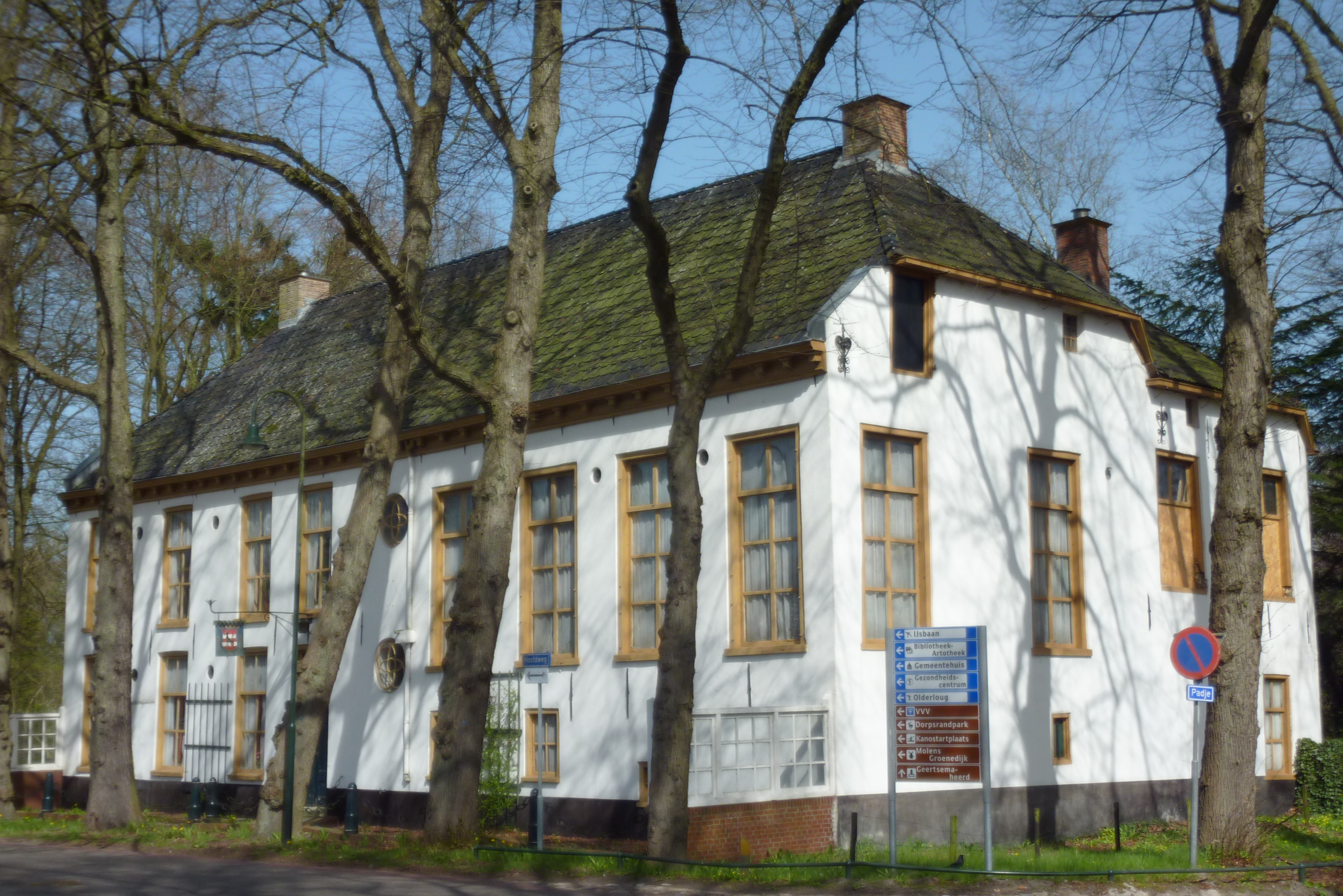
Former courthouse of Slochteren

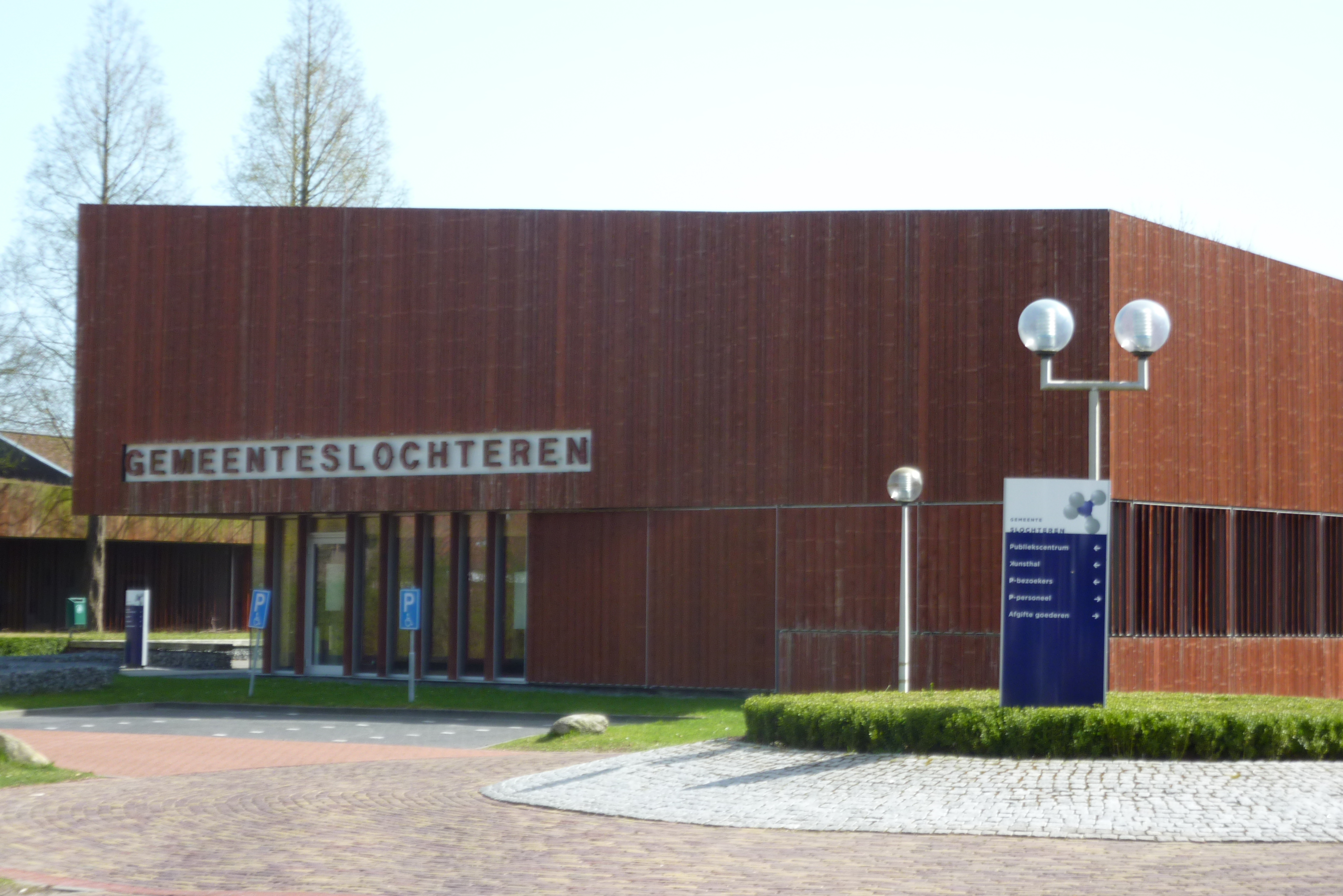
Town hall

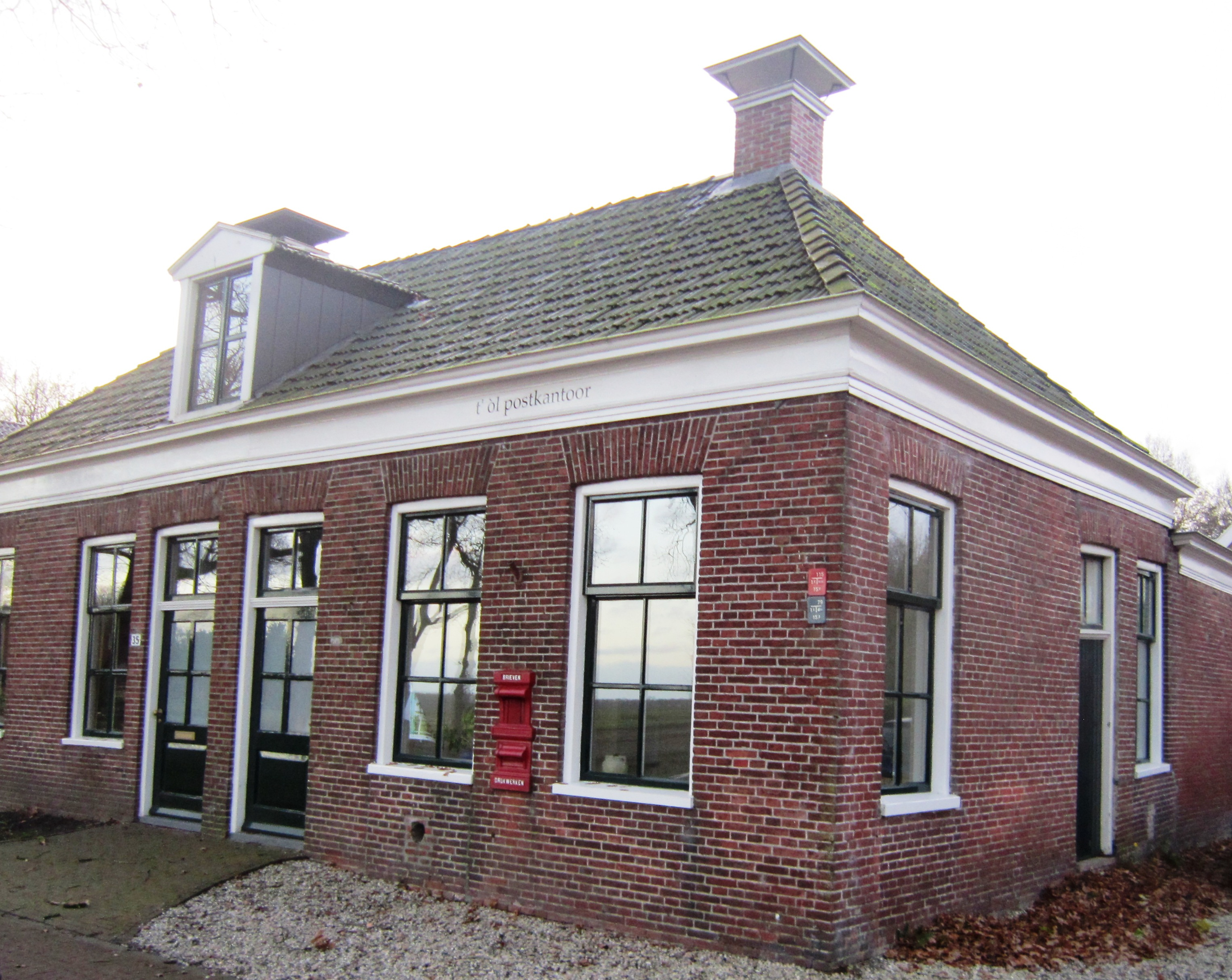
Former post office
