= Hoogezand-Sappemeer =

- Former municipality

- Location in Groningen
- Coordinates: 53°9′N 6°45′E
- Country: Netherlands
- Province: Groningen
- Municipality: Midden-Groningen
- Established: 1949
- Ceased to exist: 2018

Area
  - Total: 72.99 km^{2} (28.18 sq mi)
  - Land: 66.71 km^{2} (25.76 sq mi)
  - Water: 6.28 km^{2} (2.42 sq mi)
- Elevation: 2 m (6.6 ft)

Population (January 2021)
  - Total: data missing
- Time zone: UTC+1 (CET)
  - Summer (DST): UTC+2 (CEST)
- Postcode: 9600–9614, 9630–9633
- Area code: 0598

Hoogezand-Sappemeer (Dutch pronunciation: [ɦoːɣəˌzɑnt sɑpəˈmeːr]) is a former municipality in the Northeastern Netherlands. It was the third most-populous municipality in the province of Groningen, after Groningen and Oldambt. It was formed in 1949 by the merger of the former municipalities of Hoogezand (well-known for its ship building industry) and Sappemeer. On 1 January 2018, Hoogezand-Sappemeer merged with Slochteren and Menterwolde, forming the new municipality Midden-Groningen.

== Geography ==
Population centres in the municipality were:

- Achterdiep
- Borgercompagnie
- Borgweg
- Foxham
- Foxhol
- Foxholsterbosch
- Hoogezand
- Jagerswijk
- Kalkwijk
- Kiel-Windeweer
- Kleinemeer
- Kropswolde
- Lula
- Martenshoek
- Meerwijck
- Nieuwe Compagnie
- Sappemeer
- Tripscompagnie
- Waterhuizen
- Westerbroek
- Wolfsbarge

== Gallery ==
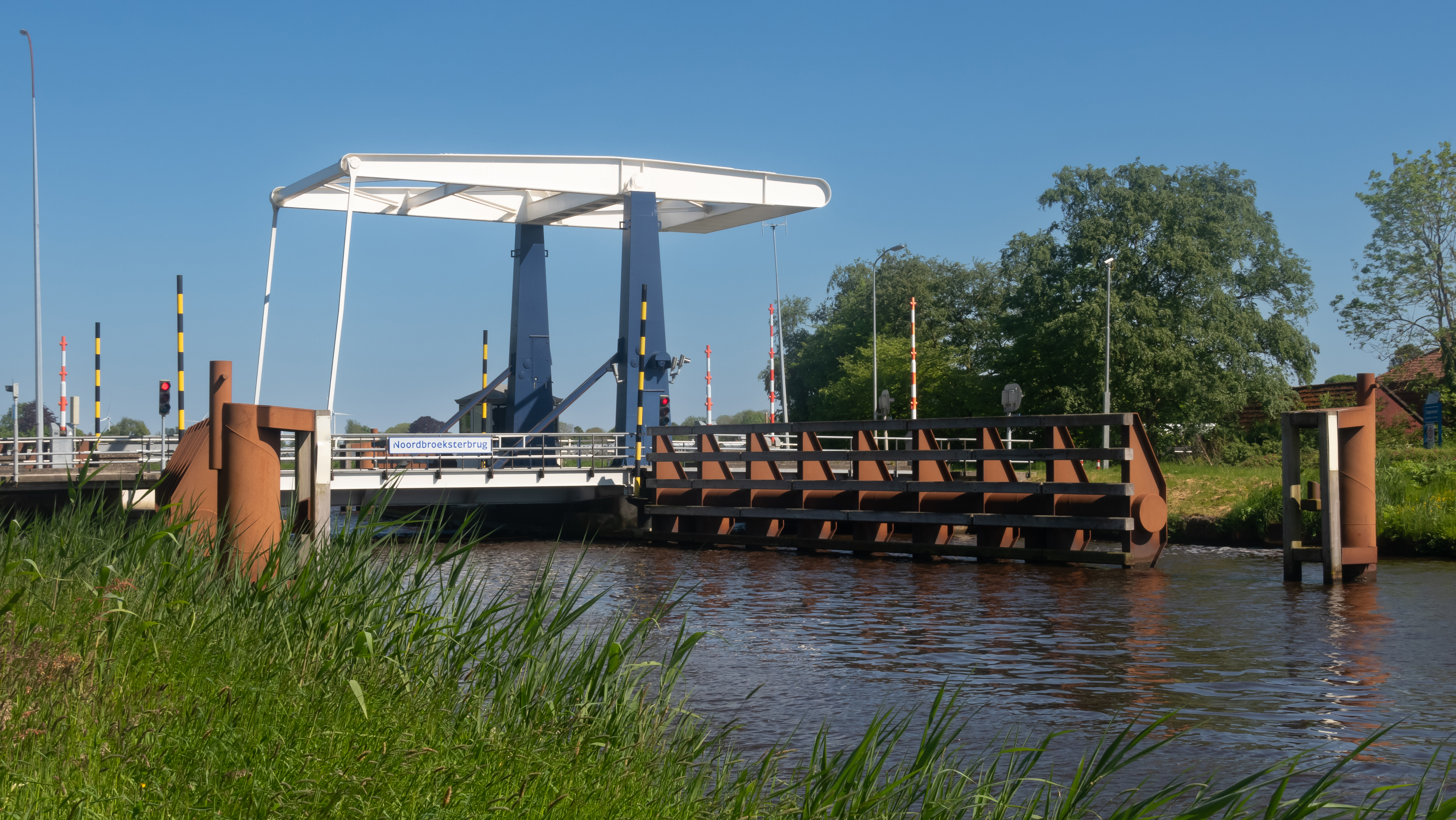
Sappemeer, bridge: the Noordbroeksterbrug

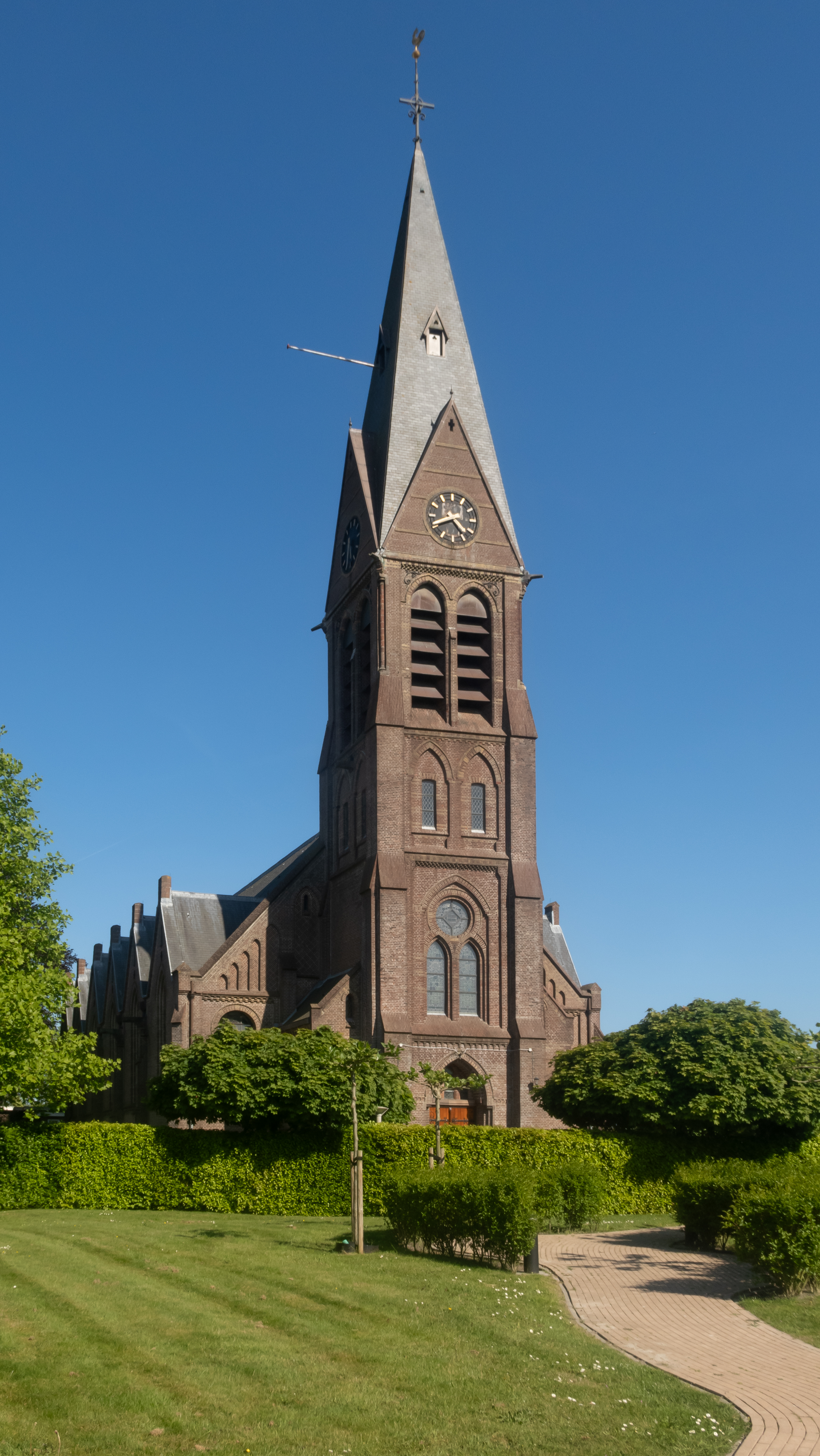
Sappemeer, church: the Sint-Willibrorduskerk

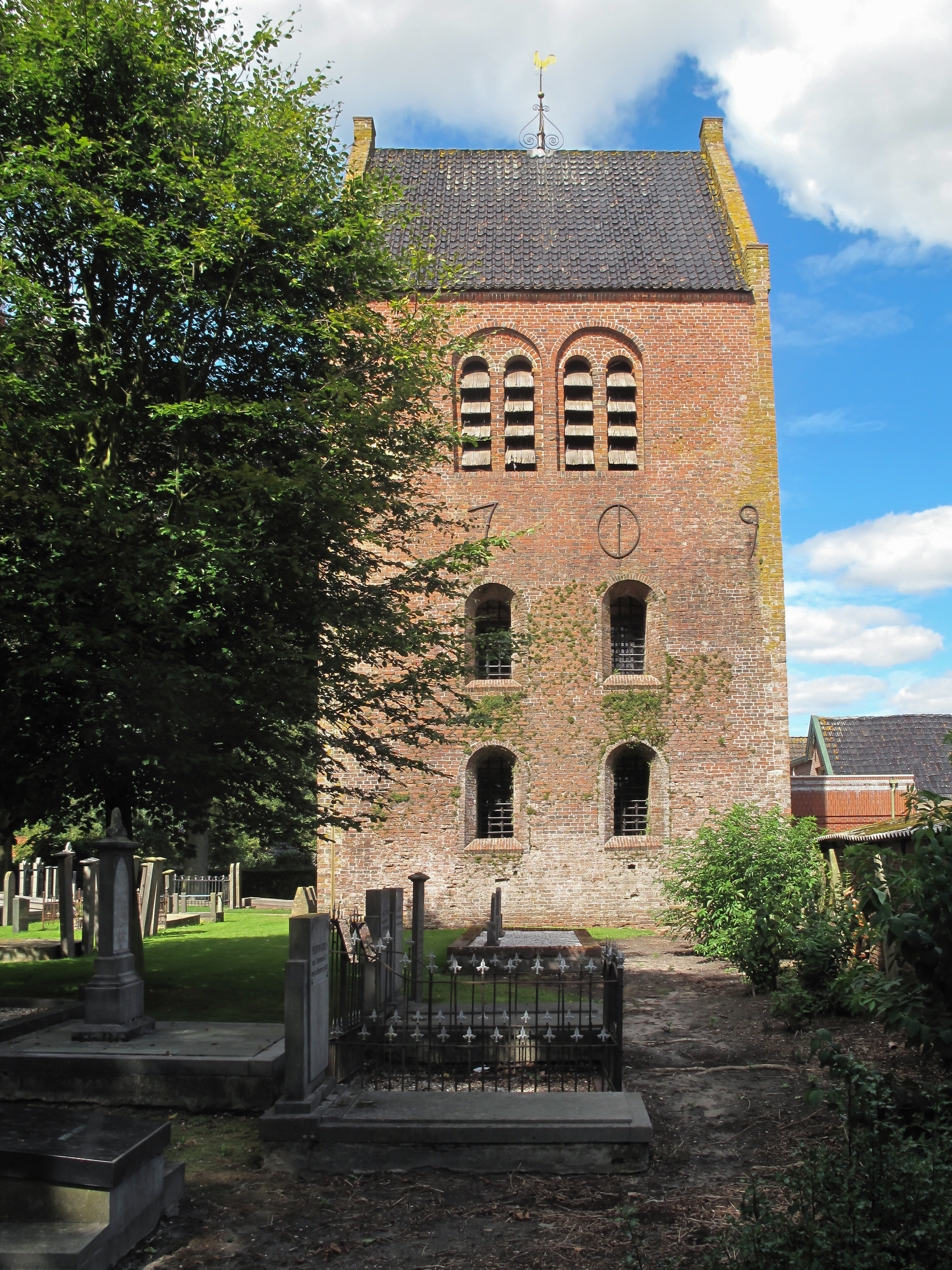
Zuidbroek, clock tower from reformed church

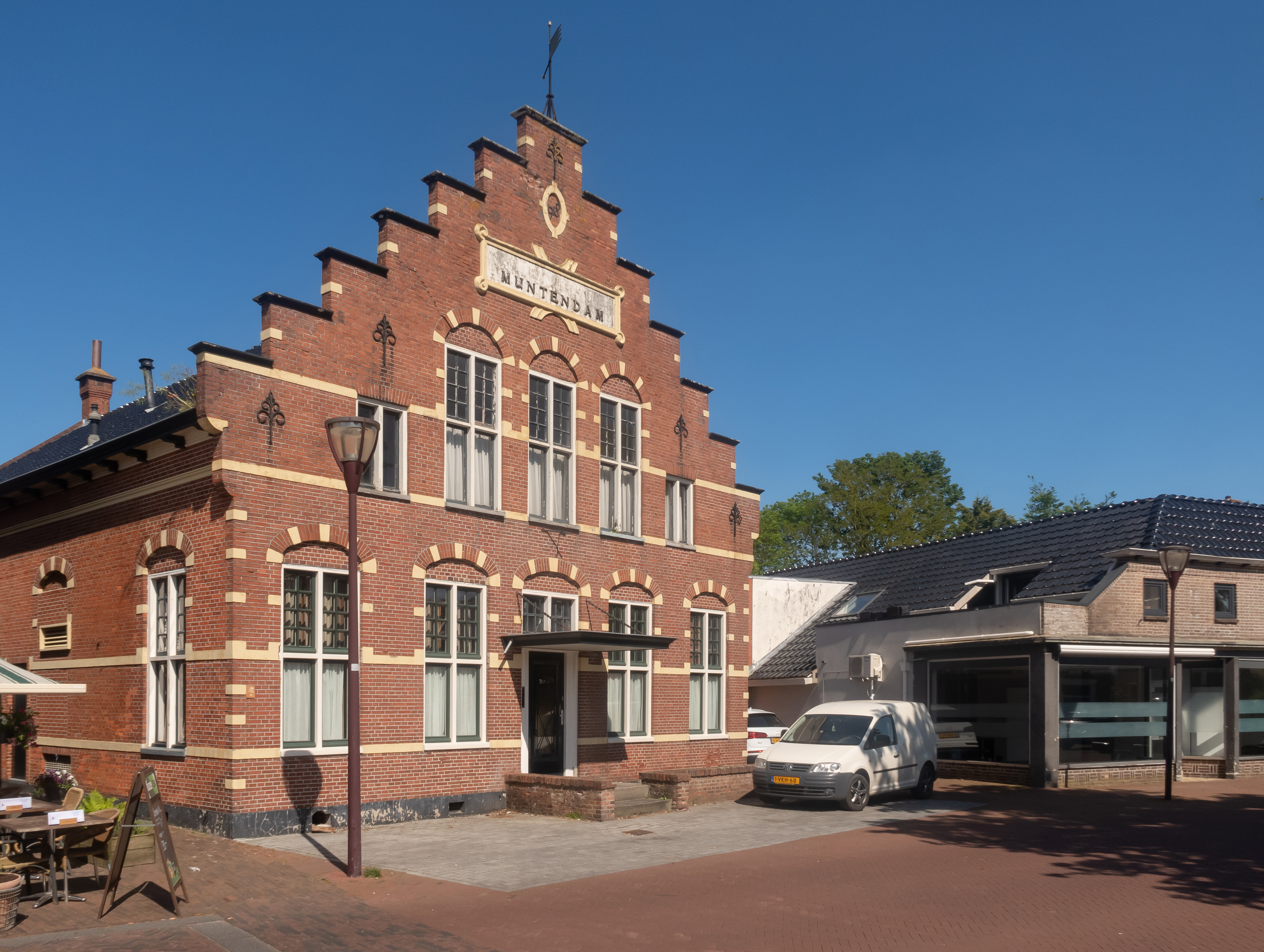
Muntendam, former townhall

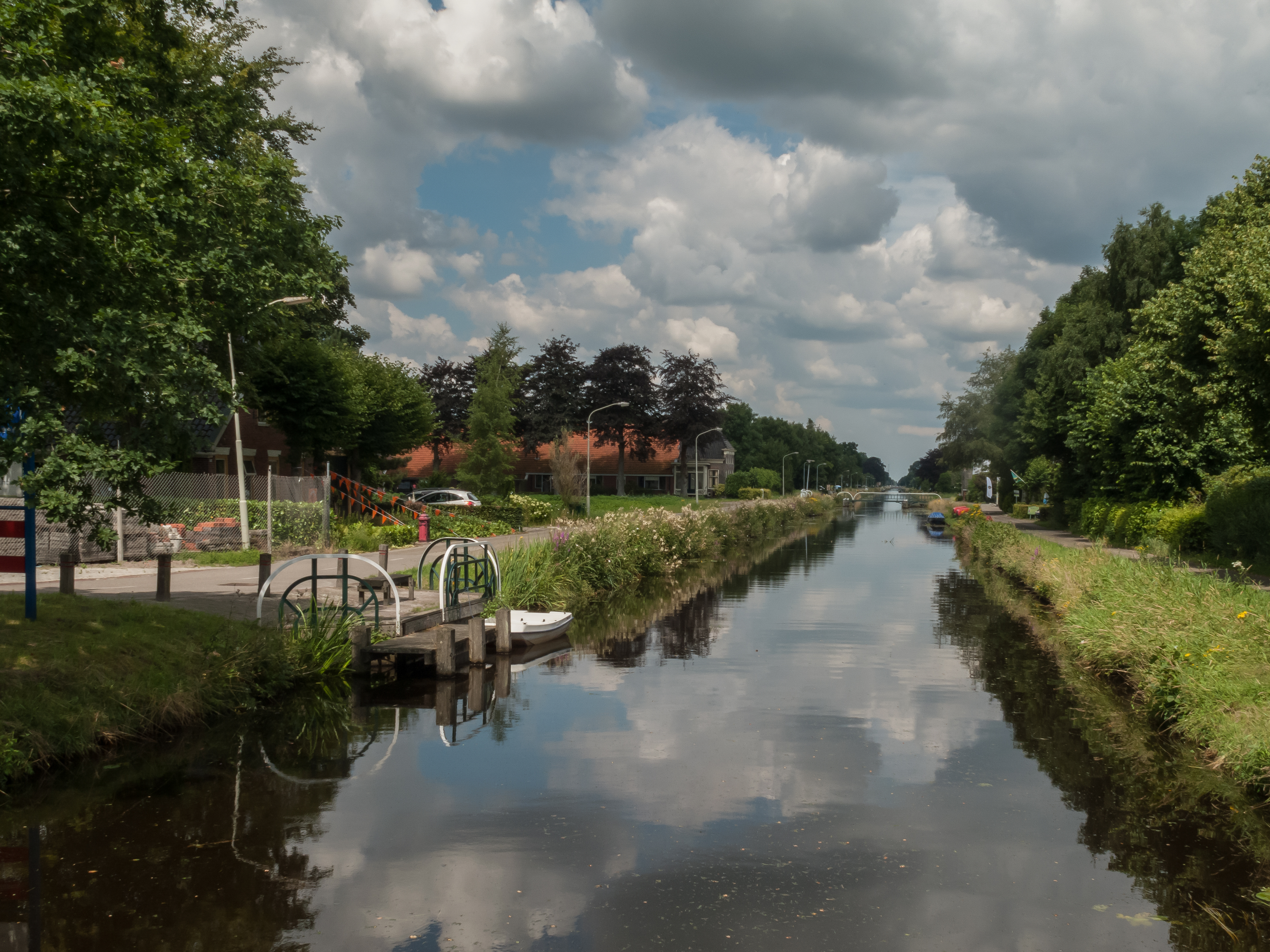
Kiel-Windeweer, view to the hamlet

== Transportation ==
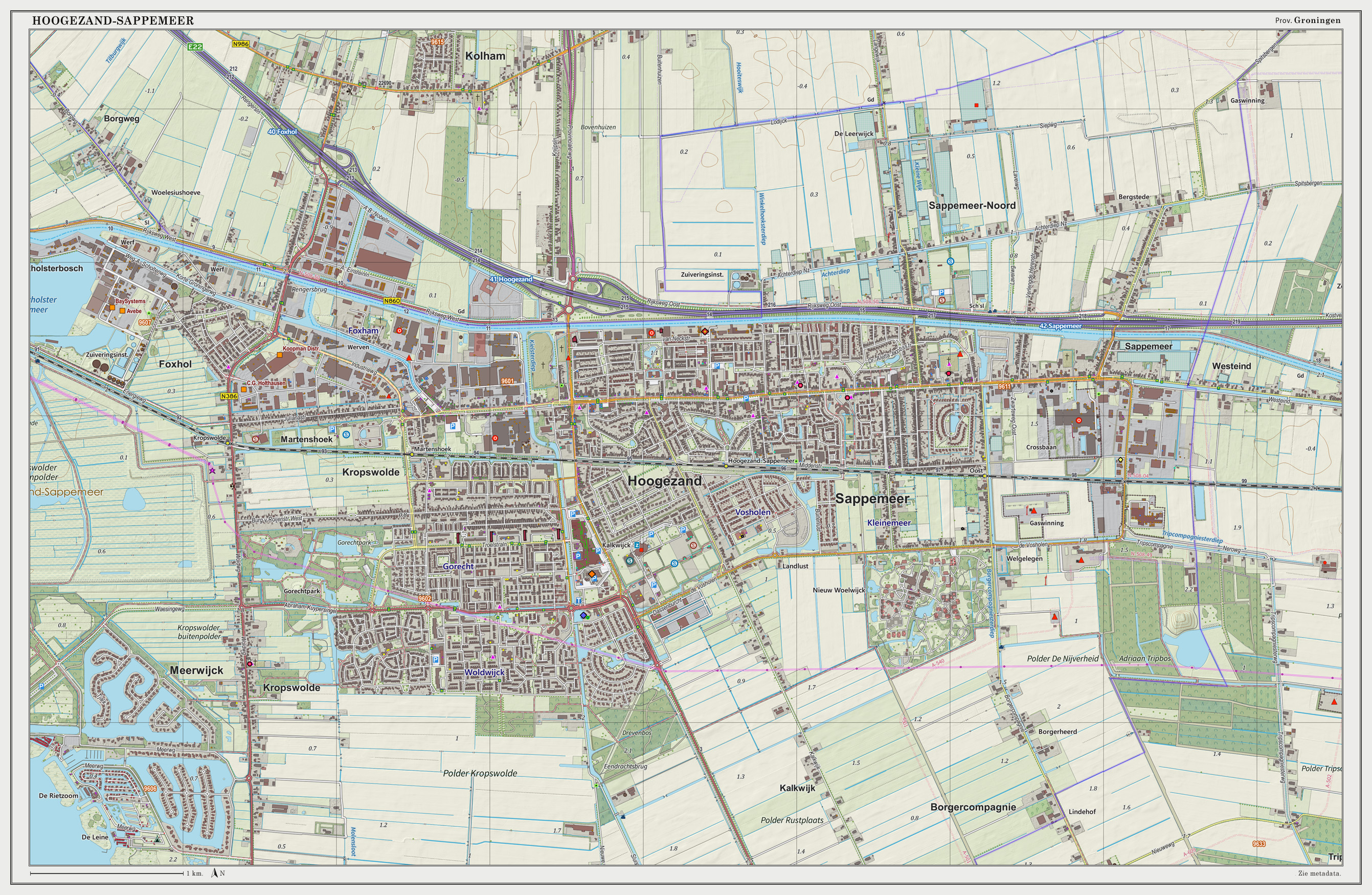
Dutch topographic map of Hoogezand-Sappemeer (town), June 2014

The A7 motorway (European Highway E 22, Amsterdam-Groningen-Germany) crosses the municipality. There is also a railway line providing service to Groningen and Nieuweschans/Leer(Germany). Trains serve four stations in the municipality, Kropswolde, Martenshoek, Hoogezand-Sappemeer, and Sappemeer Oost. Since 2007, trains will stop 4 times an hour.
