= Kropswolde railway station =

Railway station in the Dutch village of Kropswolde

Kropswolde
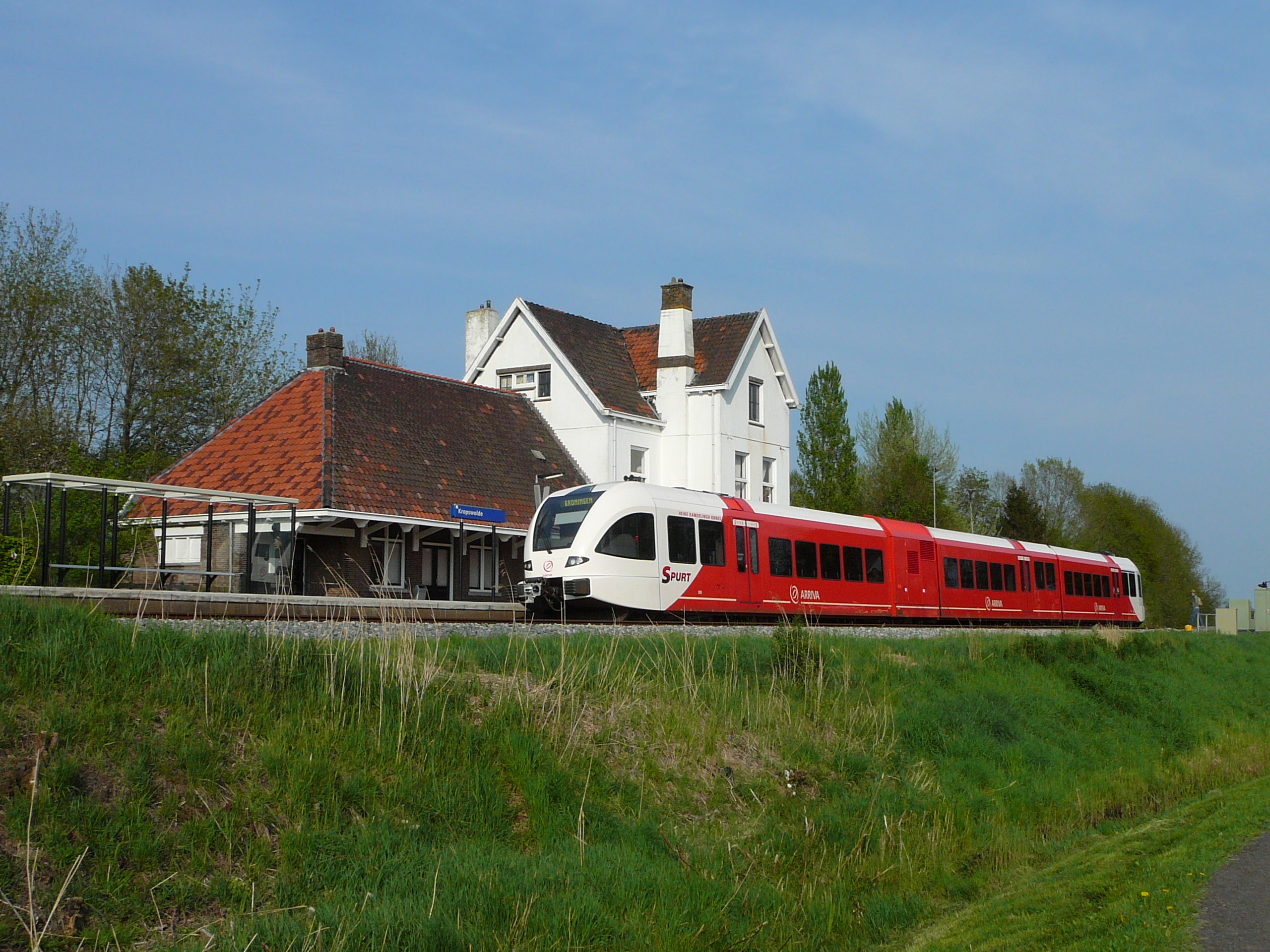
- Kropswolde railway station in 2008

General information
- Location: Woldweg 46; Foxhol, Netherlands
- Coordinates: 53°09′42″N 6°43′17″E
- Owner: NS Stations
- Line: Harlingen–Nieuweschans railway
- Platforms: 2
- Tracks: 2
- Train operators: Arriva

Other information
- Station code: Kw

History
- Opened: 1 May 1868

Services
| Preceding station | Arriva Netherlands | Following station |
|---|---|---|
| Groningen Europapark towards Groningen | Stoptrein 20100 | Martenshoek towards Leer |
| Groningen Europapark towards Groningen | Stoptrein 37500 | Martenshoek towards Bad Nieuweschans |
| Groningen Europapark towards Groningen | Stoptrein 37800 | Martenshoek towards Veendam |
Location
- Location within Netherlands

Kropswolde (Dutch pronunciation: [krɔpsˈʋɔldə]; abbreviation: Kw) is an unstaffed railway station in Foxhol near Kropswolde in the Netherlands. The station was opened on 1 May 1868 and is located on the Harlingen–Nieuweschans railway between Groningen Europapark and Martenshoek in the province of Groningen. Train services are operated by Arriva.

== Location ==
The railway station is located at the Woldweg in the village of Foxhol, just north of the village of Kropswolde, both part of the municipality of Midden-Groningen, in the province of Groningen in the northeast of the Netherlands. It is situated on the Harlingen–Nieuweschans railway between the railway stations of Groningen Europapark and Martenshoek.

== History ==
The original station building was completed in 1865. The Harlingen–Nieuweschans railway between Groningen and Winschoten including Kropswolde was opened on 1 May 1868. The original station building was replaced by the current building in 1915. In 1989 the station was slated for demolition. However, with the support of Hoogezand-Sappemeer, a group of artists renovated the station and turned its rooms into gallery and workshop spaces, with artworks produced for passengers to view.

== Building and layout ==
The station building is owned by NS Stations. It has been a national heritage site (Dutch: rijksmonument) since 2001.

The unelectrified double track railway passes through the station from west to east. At the station, there are two tracks with a platform each: platform 1 is north of the northern track and platform 2 is south of the southern track. The platforms are separated by a level crossing of the public road.

== Train services ==
| Route | Service type | Operator | Notes |
|---|---|---|---|
| Groningen - Hoogezand-Sappemeer - Zuidbroek - Veendam | Local ("Stoptrein") | Arriva | 2x per hour - 1x per hour on evenings and Sundays. |
| Groningen - Hoogezand-Sappemeer - Zuidbroek - Winschoten - Bad Nieuweschans - Leer (Germany) | Local ("Stoptrein") | Arriva | 1x per hour |
| Groningen - Hoogezand-Sappemeer - Zuidbroek - Winschoten (- Bad Nieuweschans) | Local ("Stoptrein") | Arriva | 1x per hour - 1x per 2 hours on Sundays. During morning rush hour and on evenings, a couple of runs run through to Bad Nieuweschans. |

== Bus services ==
There are no bus services at this station. The nearest bus stop is in Hoogezand.
