= Berkel-class tugboat =

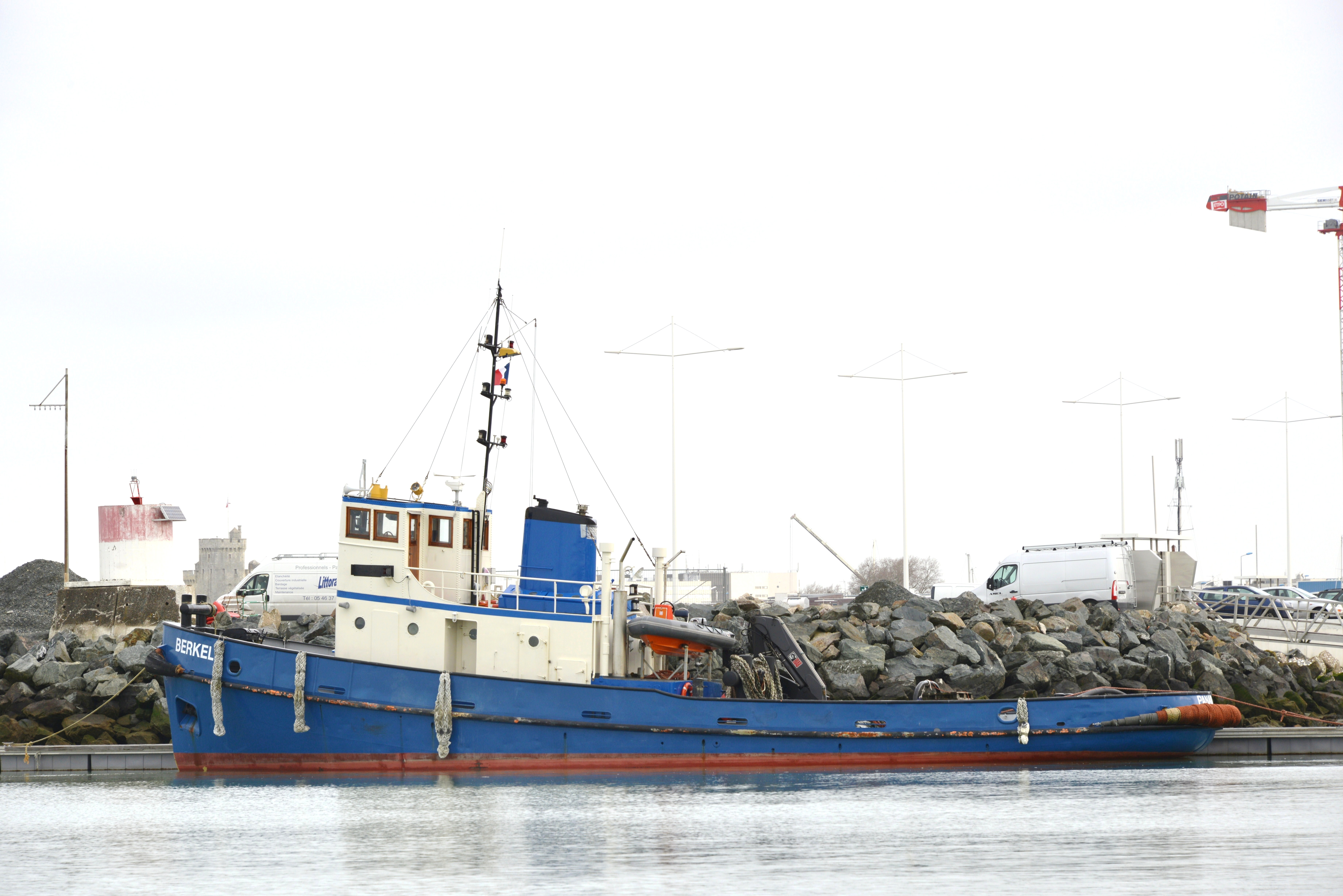
- Berkel

Class overview
- Name: Berkel class
- Builders: Scheepswerf v.h H.H. Bodewes, Millingen
- Operators: Royal Netherlands Navy
- Built: 1956-1957
- Completed: 4

General characteristics
- Type: Tugboat
- Displacement: 163 t (160 long tons)
- Length: 25.10 m (82 ft 4 in)
- Beam: 6.30 m (20 ft 8 in)
- Draft: 2.20 metres (7 ft 3 in)
- Propulsion: 1 propeller; 500 hp (370 kW); 8 cylinder Werkspoor diesel engine
- Speed: 10.8 knots (20.0 km/h; 12.4 mph)
- Crew: 5

The Berkel class (Note: They were also known as B class.) was a ship class of four tugboats that were built in the Netherlands for the Royal Netherlands Navy.

== Design and construction ==
The tugboats of the Berkel class were constructed at the shipyard of Scheepswerf v.h H.H. Bodewes in Millingen. They were equipped with firefighting and salvage installations.

== Service history ==
During their service the tugboats of the Berkel class had as main task helping larger naval ships of the Royal Netherlands Navy during their arrival and departure from Dutch harbors.

In August 1958 the four tugboats of the Berkel class together with Orkaan were used to pull the Dutch cruiser De Zeven Provinciën loose after it had run aground.

== Ships in class ==
Berkel class construction data
Pennant no.	Name	Builder	Laid down	Launched	Commissioned	Decommissioned	Fate
Y 8037	Berkel	Scheepswerf v.h H.H. Bodewes; Millingen, Netherlands	27 April 1956	26 September 1956	27 December 1956	23 September 1987	Sold on 20 March 1988 to C. Santen
Y 8038	Dintel	Scheepswerf v.h H.H. Bodewes; Millingen, Netherlands	22 May 1956	17 November 1956	23 January 1957		Sold on 29 March 1988 to C. Rijf
Y 8039	Dommel	Scheepswerf v.h H.H. Bodewes; Millingen, Netherlands	29 August 1956	22 December 1956	27 February 1957	30 March 1987	Sold on 16 June 1987
Y 8040	IJssel	Scheepswerf v.h H.H. Bodewes; Millingen, Netherlands	17 September 1956	18 January 1957	20 March 1957		Sold on 29 March 1988 to C. Santen
