= Sappemeer Oost railway station =

Railway station in Hoogezand-Sappemeer, Netherlands

Sappemeer Oost
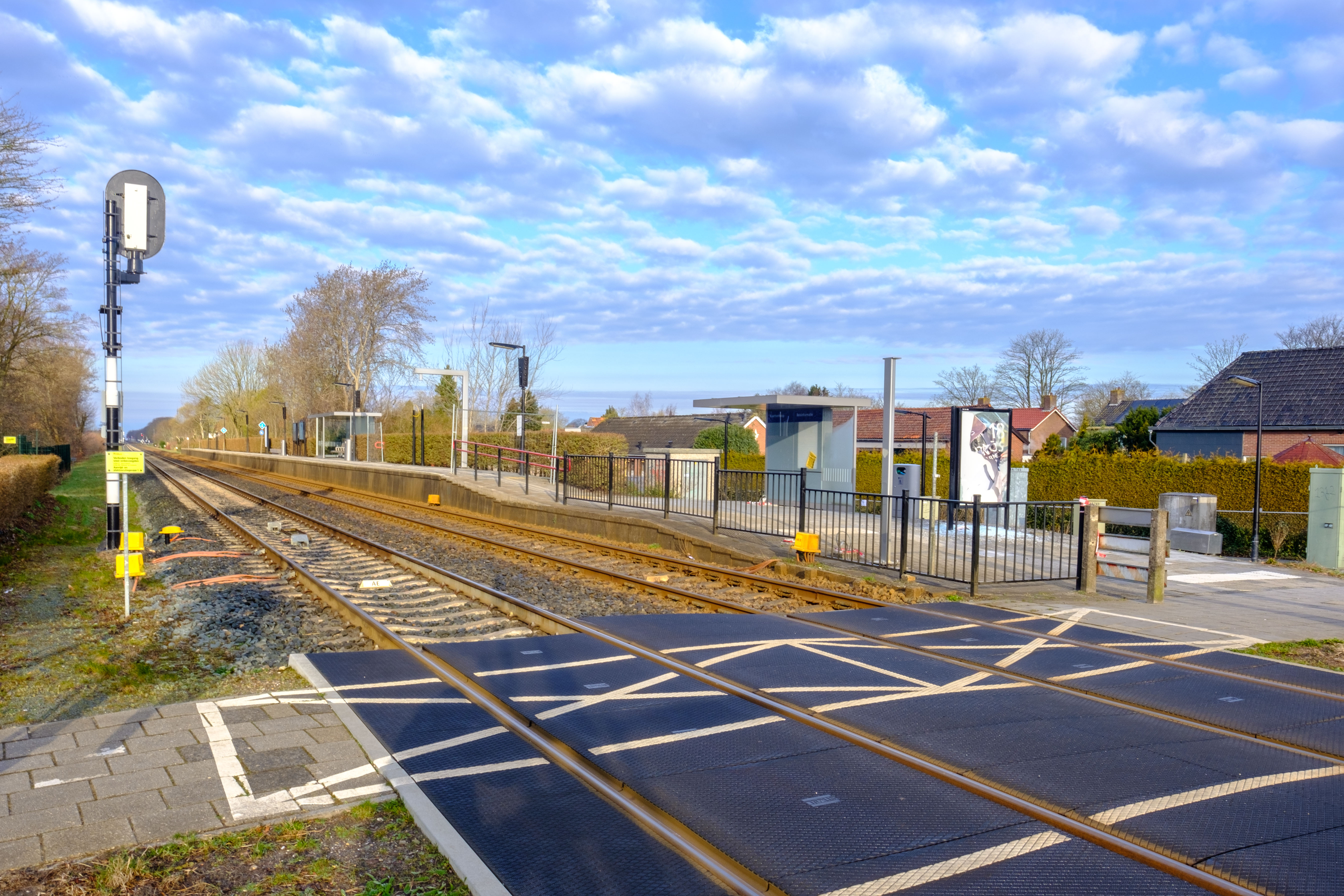

General information
- Location: Borgercompagniesterstraat; Sappemeer, Netherlands
- Coordinates: 53°09′32″N 6°47′40″E
- Owner: NS Stations
- Line: Harlingen–Nieuweschans railway
- Platforms: 2
- Tracks: 2
- Train operators: Arriva

Other information
- Station code: Spm

History
- Opened: 1 January 1887
- Closed: 13 December 2020
- Former names: Borgercompagniesterweg (1887–1900)
Location
- Location within Netherlands

Sappemeer Oost (Dutch pronunciation: [ˌsɑpəˈmeːr oːst]; abbreviation: Spm), previously named Borgercompagniesterweg (1887–1900), was an unstaffed railway station in Sappemeer in the Netherlands. It was located on the Harlingen–Nieuweschans railway between Hoogezand-Sappemeer and Zuidbroek.

Train services started on 1 January 1887 and have since been provided by Maatschappij tot Exploitatie van Staatsspoorwegen (1887–1937), Nederlandse Spoorwegen (1938–2000), NoordNed (2000–2005), and Arriva (2005–present). There was a station building between 1891 and 1973, which was replaced by a shelter. The station was definitely closed in 2020.

The station has two tracks and two platforms. Before the station was closed, there were three local train services with four trains per hour to and from Groningen, two trains to and from Veendam, and two trains to and from Bad Nieuweschans.

== Location ==
The railway station is located at the Borgercompagniesterstraat (53°09′32″N 06°47′40″E) in the village of Sappemeer in the province of Groningen in the northeast of the Netherlands. It is situated on the Harlingen–Nieuweschans railway between the railway stations of Hoogezand-Sappemeer in the west and Zuidbroek in the east. The Scholte railway stop was between Sappemeer Oost and Zuidbroek from 1933 to 1935. The distance from Sappemeer Oost westward to railway terminus Harlingen Haven is 97 km (60 mi), to Groningen 17 km (11 mi), and to Hoogezand-Sappemeer 1.6 km (0.99 mi), and eastward to Zuidbroek 4.9 km (3.0 mi), and to Bad Nieuweschans is 30 km (19 mi).

== History ==
The segment of the Harlingen–Nieuweschans railway between Groningen and Winschoten was opened on 1 May 1868, when train services started at the nearby Hoogezand-Sappemeer railway station. From 1 January 1887, trains also call at Borgercompagniesterweg, the former name of Sappemeer Oost. Initially, the trains were operated by the Maatschappij tot Exploitatie van Staatsspoorwegen (Company for the Exploitation of the State Railways). In 1891, the station building of the type Visvliet was completed.

In 1900, the railway station was renamed from Borgercompagniesterweg to Sappemeer Oost. In 1917, the station building was expanded with a third class waiting room. In 1938, the Maatschappij tot Exploitatie van Staatsspoorwegen merged with the Hollandsche IJzeren Spoorweg-Maatschappij (Hollandic Iron Railroad Company) and became the train operator Nederlandse Spoorwegen (Netherlands Railways). In 1973, the station building was demolished and replaced by a simple shelter.

Since 2000, trains have been operated by NoordNed, which became Arriva in 2005.

== Station layout ==
The double-track railway through Sappemeer is unelectrified and oriented west to east. At the station are two platforms, platform 1 on the north side of the northern track and platform 2 on the south side of the southern track, that are on separate sides of a level crossing of the public road.

== Train services ==
| Route | Service type | Operator | Notes |
|---|---|---|---|
| Groningen - Hoogezand-Sappemeer - Zuidbroek - Veendam | Local ("Stoptrein") | Arriva | 2x per hour - 1x per hour on evenings and Sundays. |
| Groningen - Hoogezand-Sappemeer - Zuidbroek - Winschoten - Bad Nieuweschans - Leer (Germany) | Local ("Stoptrein") | Arriva | 1x per hour |
| Groningen - Hoogezand-Sappemeer - Zuidbroek - Winschoten (- Bad Nieuweschans) | Local ("Stoptrein") | Arriva | 1x per hour - 1x per 2 hours on Sundays. During morning rush hour and on evenings, a couple of runs run through to Bad Nieuweschans. |

== Bus services ==
There is no bus service at this station. The nearest bus stop is Noorderstraat in Sappemeer.
