= HNLMS Orkaan =

Tugboat of the Royal Netherlands Navy

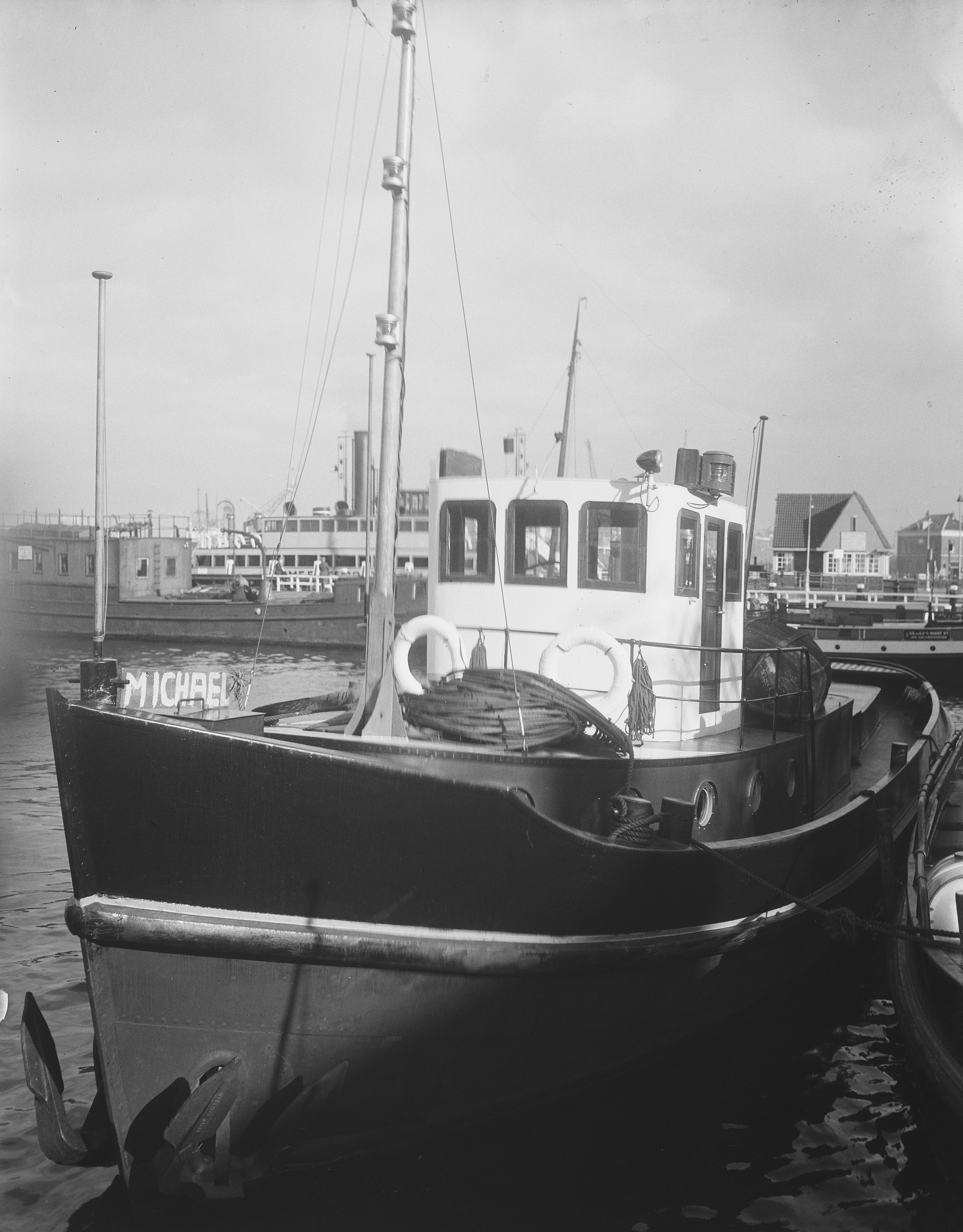
- Orkaan

History

Netherlands
- Name: Orkaan
- Operator: Royal Netherlands Navy
- Builder: Gebr. Fikkers, Martenshoek
- Laid down: 1948
- Launched: 27 January 1949
- Commissioned: 7 November 1949
- Decommissioned: 23 May 1961
- Identification: IMO number: 5402887

General characteristics
- Type: Tugboat
- Displacement: 238 t (234 long tons)
- Length: 28.60 m (93 ft 10 in)
- Beam: 6.60 m (21 ft 8 in)
- Draught: 3.6 m (11 ft 10 in)
- Propulsion: 1,200 hp (890 kW); 1 x MAN diesel engine
- Speed: 12 knots (22 km/h; 14 mph)
- Armament: 1 x 20 mm machine guns

HNLMS Orkaan (A837) was a tugboat of the Royal Netherlands Navy (RNN). She served in the RNN between 1949 and 1961. It was at the time the largest tugboat to be built in the Netherlands for the RNN.

== Design and construction ==
Orkaan was laid down in 1948 and launched on 27 January 1949 at the shipyard of Gebr. Fikkers in Martenshoek, Groningen. She was commissioned into the Royal Netherlands Navy on 7 November 1949.

The boat was equipped with a 1200 horse power MAN diesel engine. This made it possible to reach a speed of up to 12 knots.

== Service history ==
Besides acting as tugboat the Orkaan could also be used as salvage ship when necessary and was equipped with firefighting equipment.

In 1954 Orkaan helped tow the light ship Terschellingerbank to Rotterdam after it collided with a ship.

In 1961 Orkaan was sold.
