= Hoogezand-Sappemeer railway station =

Railway station in Hoogezand-Sappemeer, Netherlands

Hoogezand-Sappemeer
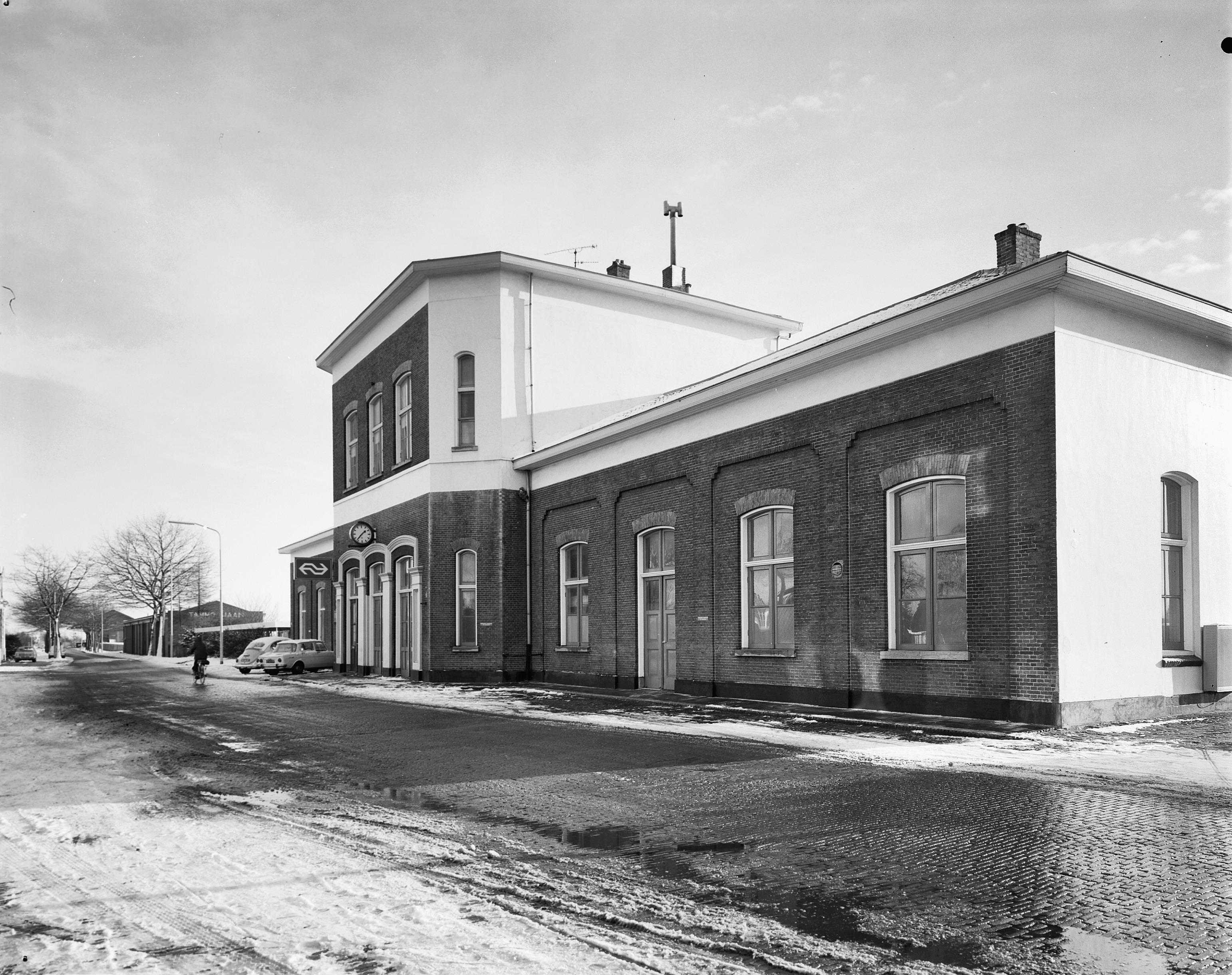
- Station building in 1973

General information
- Location: Stationsweg 4, Hoogezand, Netherlands
- Coordinates: 53°09′34″N 6°46′18″E
- Operator: NS Stations
- Line: Harlingen–Nieuweschans railway
- Platforms: 2
- Tracks: 2
- Train operators: Arriva
- Bus operators: Taxi de Grooth

Other information
- Station code: Hgz

History
- Opened: 1 May 1868

Services
| Preceding station | Arriva Netherlands | Following station |
|---|---|---|
| Martenshoek towards Groningen | Stoptrein 20100 | Sappemeer Oost towards Leer |
| Martenshoek towards Groningen | Stoptrein 37500 | Sappemeer Oost towards Bad Nieuweschans |
| Martenshoek towards Groningen | Stoptrein 37800 | Sappemeer Oost towards Veendam |
Location
- Location within Netherlands

Hoogezand-Sappemeer (Dutch pronunciation: [ɦoːɣəˌzɑnt sɑpəˈmeːr]; abbreviation: Hgz) is an unstaffed railway station in Hoogezand in the Netherlands. It is located on the Harlingen–Nieuweschans railway between Martenshoek and Sappemeer Oost in the province of Groningen. Train services started in 1868 and the current station building was completed in 1989. There are currently three train services, all operated by Arriva. Among the direct destinations are Groningen to the west, Veendam to the southeast, and Winschoten, Bad Nieuweschans, and Leer (Germany) to the east.

== Location ==
The railway station is located at the Stationsweg in the municipality of Midden-Groningen in the south of the province of Groningen in the northeast of the Netherlands. It is situated on the Harlingen–Nieuweschans railway between the railway stations Martenshoek and Sappemeer Oost.

== Building and layout ==
The former station building was completed in 1865. It was designed by Karel Hendrik van Brederode. The building was demolished in 1989.

The signal box from the station is now at the Railway Museum in Utrecht.

The current station building was completed in 1989. It was designed by Rob Steenhuis.

At the station, the double track has two separate platforms.

== Train services ==
| Route | Service type | Operator | Notes |
|---|---|---|---|
| Groningen - Hoogezand-Sappemeer - Zuidbroek - Veendam | Local ("Stoptrein") | Arriva | 2x per hour - 1x per hour on evenings and Sundays. |
| Groningen - Hoogezand-Sappemeer - Zuidbroek - Winschoten - Bad Nieuweschans - Leer (Germany) | Local ("Stoptrein") | Arriva | 1x per hour |
| Groningen - Hoogezand-Sappemeer - Zuidbroek - Winschoten (- Bad Nieuweschans) | Local ("Stoptrein") | Arriva | 1x per hour - 1x per 2 hours on Sundays. During morning rush hour and on evenings, a couple of runs run through to Bad Nieuweschans. |

== Bus services ==
| Line | Route | Operator | Notes |
|---|---|---|---|
| 515 | Hoogezand-Sappemeer Station - Sappemeer Achterdiep - Hoogezand Centrum (town centre) - Hoogezand Gorecht - Hoogezand Zuiderkroon | Taxi de Grooth | Mon-Sat during daytime hours only (with 2 extra runs once a month on shopping nights ("koopavonden"). |
