= Scholte railway stop =

Scholte

General information
- Location: Netherlands
- Coordinates: 53°9′32″N 6°48′16″E
- Line: Harlingen–Nieuweschans railway
- Train operators: Staatsspoorwegen

History
- Opened: 1 January 1933
- Closed: 1 January 1935
Location
- Location within Netherlands

Scholte (Dutch pronunciation: [ˈsxɔltə]) was a railway stop (Dutch: stopplaats) in the province of Groningen in the Netherlands. It was situated on the Harlingen–Nieuweschans railway between the railway stations of Sappemeer Oost and Zuidbroek. It was in service for the employees of the company Scholten between 1933 and 1935.
