= Martenshoek railway station =

Railway station in Martenshoek, Netherlands

Martenshoek
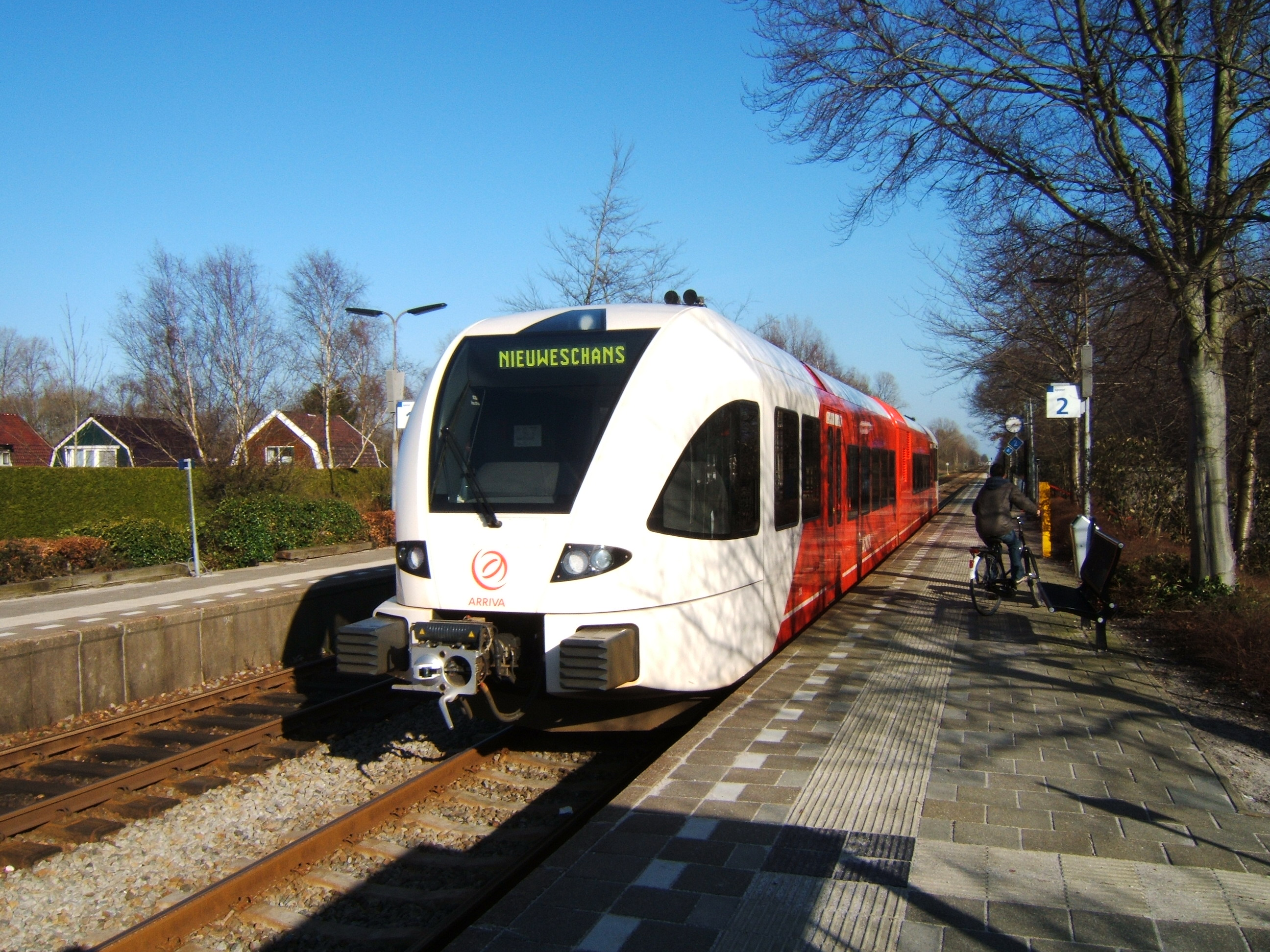
- Martenshoek railway station in 2007

General information
- Location: Spoorstraat 39; Martenshoek, Netherlands
- Coordinates: 53°09′38″N 6°44′24″E
- Line: Harlingen–Nieuweschans railway
- Platforms: 2
- Tracks: 2

Other information
- Station code: Mth

History
- Opened: 1 Jan 1905

Services
Preceding station	Arriva Netherlands	Following station
Kropswolde towards Groningen	Stoptrein 20100	Hoogezand-Sappemeer towards Leer
Kropswolde towards Groningen	Stoptrein 37500	Hoogezand-Sappemeer towards Bad Nieuweschans
Kropswolde towards Groningen	Stoptrein 37800	Hoogezand-Sappemeer towards Veendam
Location
- Location within Netherlands

Martenshoek (Dutch pronunciation: [ˌmɑrtənsˈɦuk]; abbreviation: Mth) is an unstaffed railway station in Martenshoek in the Netherlands. The station opened on 1 Jan 1905 and is located on the Harlingen–Nieuweschans railway between Groningen and Nieuweschans. The services are operated by Arriva.

== Location ==
The railway station is located at the Spoorstraat in Martenshoek, part of the municipality of Midden-Groningen, in the province of Groningen in the northeast of the Netherlands. It is situated on the Harlingen-Nieuweschans railway between the railway stations of Kropswolde and Hoogezand-Sappemeer, both also in the municipality of Midden-Groningen.

== History ==
Train services started at Martenshoek on 1 Jan 1905. Initially, trains were operated by the Maatschappij tot Exploitatie van Staatsspoorwegen, until it merged with the Hollandsche IJzeren Spoorweg-Maatschappij to form the Nederlandse Spoorwegen in 1938. The station building was demolished and replaced by a shelter in 1970. The Nederlandse Spoorwegen operated the trains until 2000, when first NoordNed (2000–2005) and later Arriva (2005–present) received the concession for the northern railway lines of the Netherlands.

== Layout ==
At the station, there are two tracks and two platforms. Platform 1 is north of the tracks, serving trains towards Groningen, and platform 2 is south of the tracks, serving trains towards Bad Nieuweschans.

== Train services ==
Route	Service type	Operator	Notes
Groningen - Hoogezand-Sappemeer - Zuidbroek - Veendam	Local ("Stoptrein")	Arriva	2x per hour - 1x per hour on evenings and Sundays.
Groningen - Hoogezand-Sappemeer - Zuidbroek - Winschoten - Bad Nieuweschans - Leer (Germany)	Local ("Stoptrein")	Arriva	1x per hour
Groningen - Hoogezand-Sappemeer - Zuidbroek - Winschoten (- Bad Nieuweschans)	Local ("Stoptrein")	Arriva	1x per hour - 1x per 2 hours on Sundays. During morning rush hour and on evenings, a couple of runs run through to Bad Nieuweschans.

== Bus services ==
Line	Route	Operator	Notes
44	Harkstede - Scharmer - Kolham - Hoogezand - Kropswolde - De Groeve - Zuidlaren - Westlaren - Tynaarlo - Vries	CTS	Rush hours only, with a few extra runs just after morning rush hour and just before the start of the afternoon rush hour.
74	Groningen - Westerbroek - Hoogezand - Kielwindeweer - Bareveld - Stadskanaal - Musselkanaal - Valthermond - Valthe - Weerdinge - Emmen	Qbuzz	
174	(Groningen - Westerbroek - Hoogezand - Sappemeer -) Zuidbroek - Muntendam - Veendam	Taxi de Grooth and Qbuzz	The route between Groningen and Zuidbroek is only served during rush hours. No service after 22:50 (weekdays), on Saturday evenings (entirely), Sunday mornings and after 22:20 (Sunday evenings).
515	Hoogezand-Sappemeer Station - Sappemeer Achterdiep - Hoogezand Centrum (town centre) - Hoogezand Gorecht - Hoogezand Zuiderkroon	Taxi de Grooth	Mon-Sat during daytime hours only (with 2 extra runs once a month on shopping nights ("koopavonden").
