= Kropswolde =

- Village
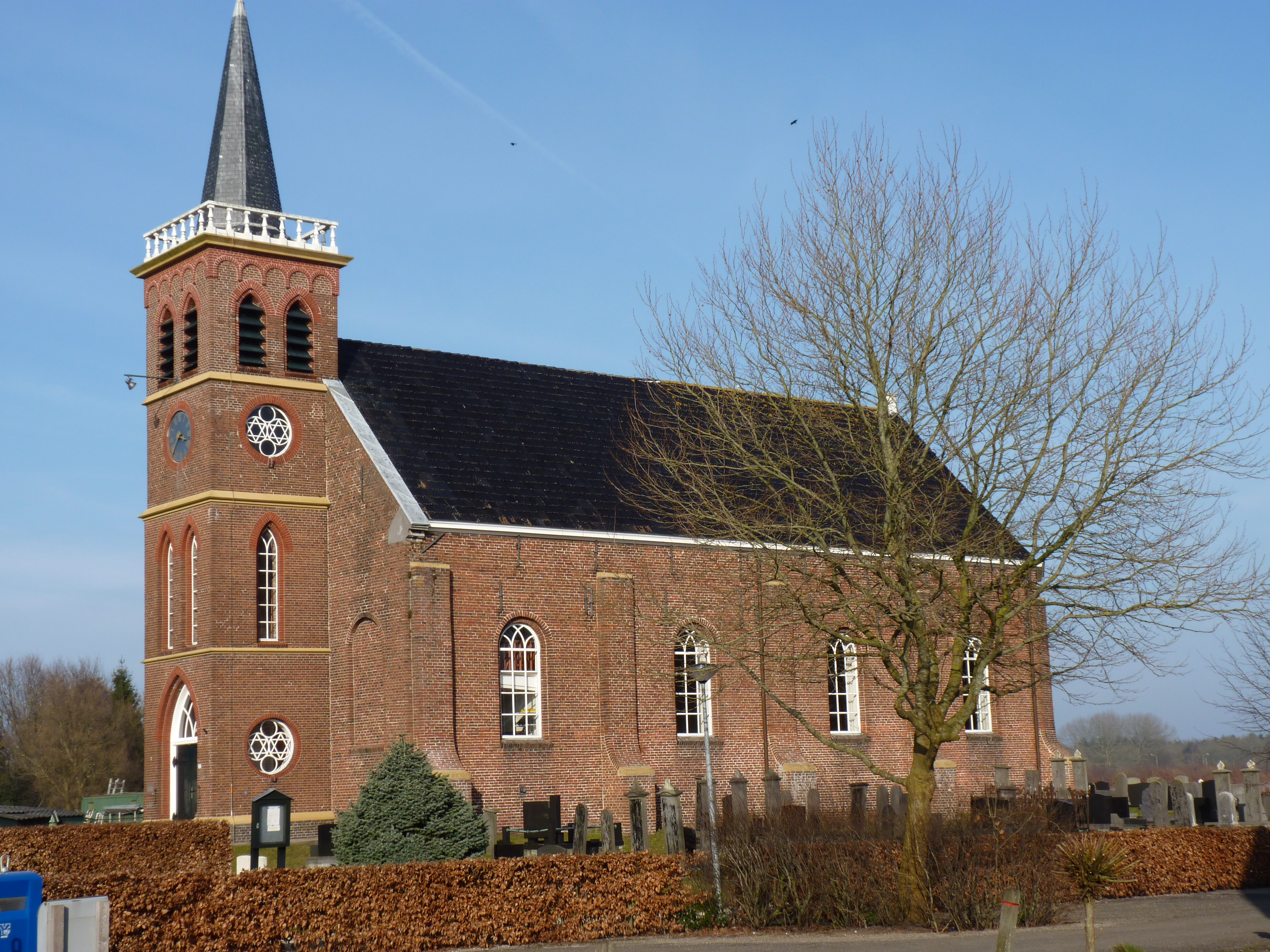
- Protestant Church in 2011

- Location of Kropswolde in the province of Groningen
- Coordinates: 53°8′45″N 6°43′23″E
- Country: Netherlands
- Province: Groningen
- Municipality: Midden-Groningen

Area
  - Total: 16.03 km^{2} (6.19 sq mi)
- Elevation: 1.0 m (3.3 ft)

Population (2021)
  - Total: 1,635
  - Density: 102.0/km^{2} (264.2/sq mi)
- Time zone: UTC+1 (CET)
  - Summer (DST): UTC+2 (CEST)
- Postal code: 9606
- Dialing code: 0598

Kropswolde (Dutch pronunciation: [krɔpsˈʋɔldə]) is a village in the Dutch province of Groningen. It is located in the municipality of Midden-Groningen, about 3 km southwest of the town of Hoogezand and 5 km northeast of the town of Zuidlaren.

== History ==
The village used to be a part of the jurisdiction of "Gorecht". The first confirmed mention of the village is in a charter from the year 1249 where it is called "Crepeswalda". Later it is also mentioned as Crepeswolda, Crepiswald, Crep(p)eswolde, Creppeswolde or Crepelliswald.

The name Kropswolde probably relates to the old-Frisian word *krepel ("cripple or limping"). Other explanations point to a family name *Gripo or to the old-Saxion or old-Dutch word krop or croppe that can mean curvature in the landscape. It has even been speculated that the name comes from the name of an ancient tribal chief named Cruptorix, with reference to the Annals of Tacitus (Lib.IV.73) that mention a villa named Cruptorigis (= "belonging to Cruptorix") in the woods of Baduhenna that could be found in the North of the Netherlands.[2]

From the 13th until the 15th century, Kropswolde developed into a peat colony, with most of the land owned by different monastic orders. Citizens of the city of Groningen also had peat digs there. The peat was transported to the city over the Hunze river. Traffic over the Hunze was controlled by the "Schuitenschuiversgilde" ("boat pushers guild"), founded in 1403 to transport all the peat from the areas surrounding Kropswolde. Apart from them, only inhabitants of Kropswolde, Wolfsbarge and Westerbroek were allowed to transport peat, providing their ships had less capacity than those of the guild.

During the 17th, 18th and early 19th century a number of country houses and manor farms were built in Kropswolde for high-ranking citizens from Groningen and Hoogezand. The church, which still exists, was built in 1773. Its tower dates back to 1888.

Until the early 20th century there was enough peat to process. Afterward, the land was mainly used for agriculture.

At the time of the Batavian Republic in 1798, Kropswolde was temporarily combined with Lula and Kiel-Windeweer.

== Gallery ==
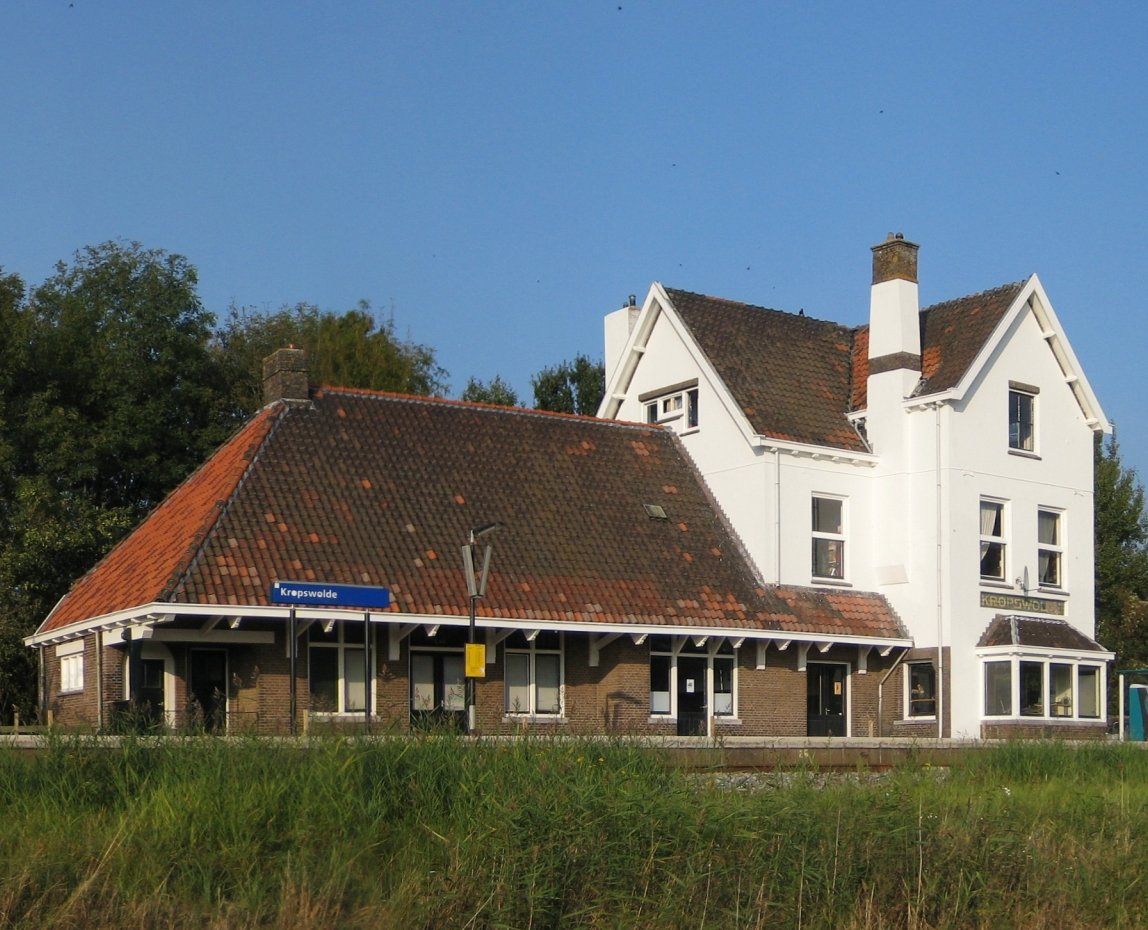
Kropswolde railway station

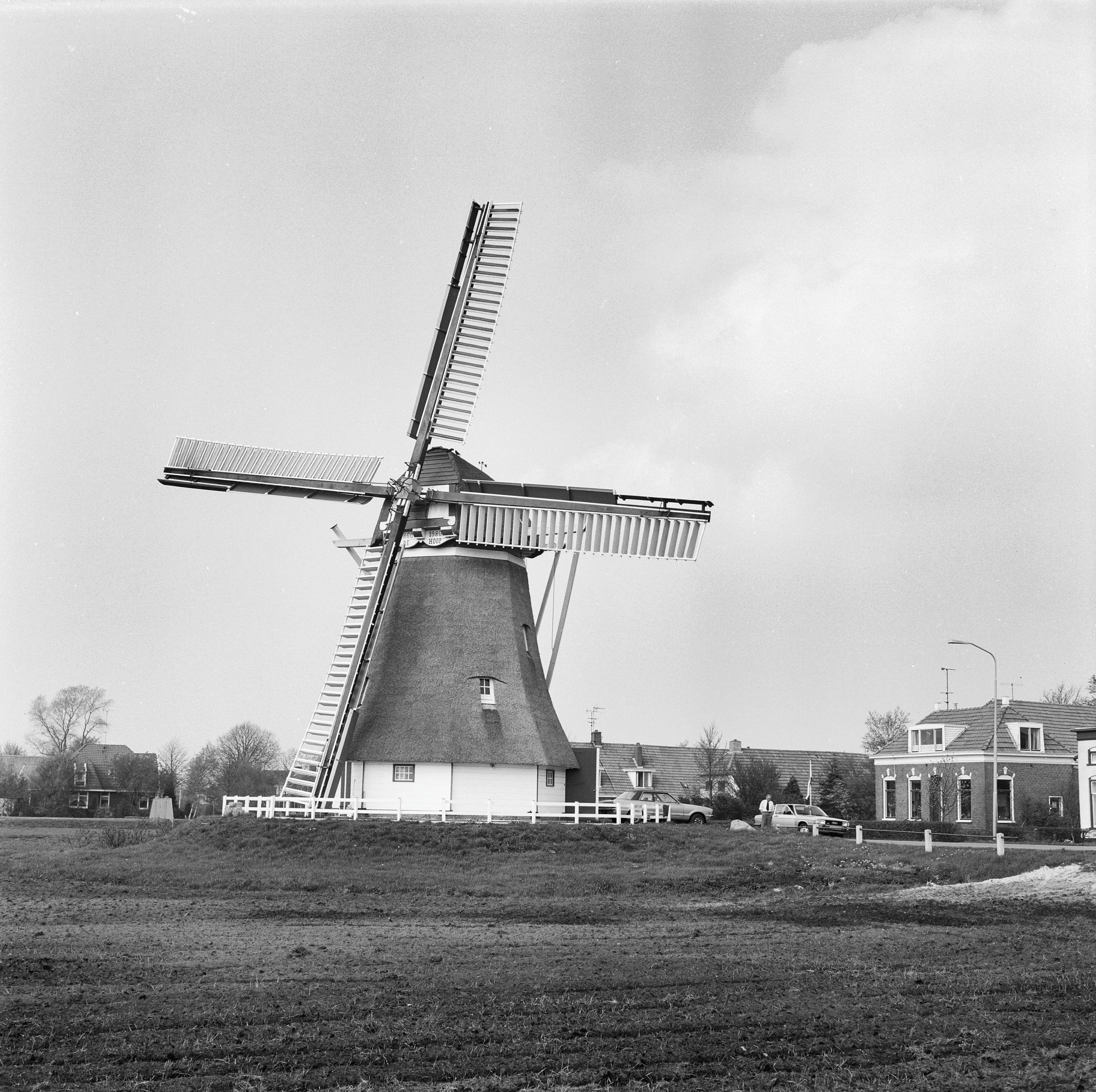
Grist mill De Hoop
