= Martenshoek =

- Neighbourhood and former village
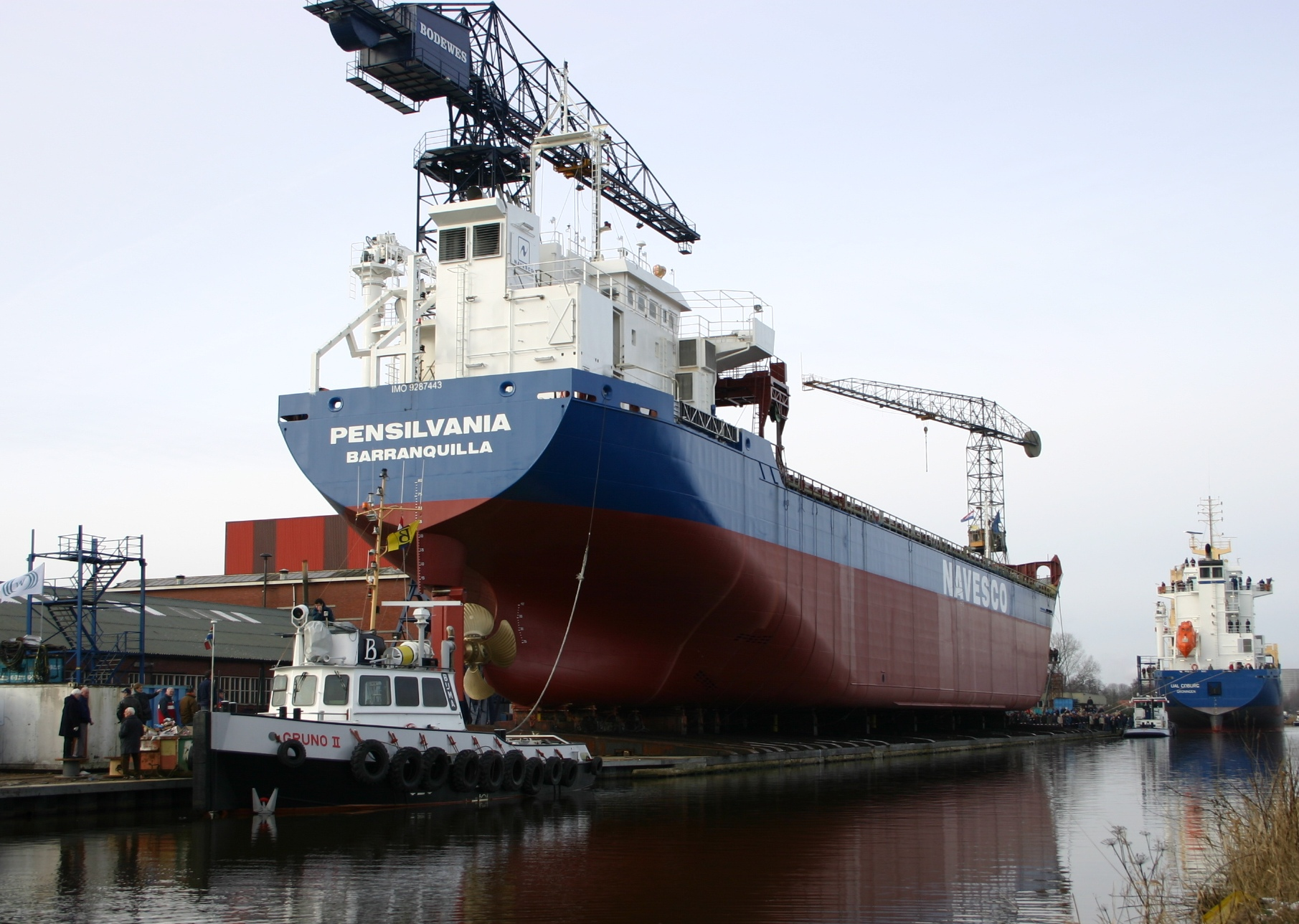
- Pensilvania in Martenshoek shortly before launch

- Location of Martenshoek in the province of Groningen Martenshoek (Netherlands)
- Coordinates: 53°9′45″N 6°44′24″E
- Country: Netherlands
- Province: Groningen
- Municipality: Midden-Groningen

Area
  - Total: 1.76 km^{2} (0.68 sq mi)
- Elevation: 1.9 m (6.2 ft)

Population (2021)
  - Total: 1,260
  - Density: 716/km^{2} (1,850/sq mi)
- Time zone: UTC+1 (CET)
  - Summer (DST): UTC+2 (CEST)
- Postal code: 9672
- Dialing code: 0598

Martenshoek (Dutch pronunciation: [ˌmɑrtənsˈɦuk]) is a neighbourhood of Hoogezand and former village in the Dutch province of Groningen. It is located in the municipality of Midden-Groningen, about 2 km west of the town of Hoogezand.

== History ==
The village was first mentioned in 1652 as St. Martenshoek, and means "neighbourhood with Martin of Tours as a patron saint". Martenshoek developed near the sluice on the Winschoterdiep. It was the gateway to the peat colonies, and developed into a trade and industry centre.

Martenshoek was home to 570 people in 1840. In 1905, a railway station opened in the village.

Martenshoek forms a single urban area with Hoogezand and is considered a neighbourhood of Hoogezand. A large part of the neighbourhood consists of industry.

== Transportation ==
Railway station: Martenshoek

== Gallery ==
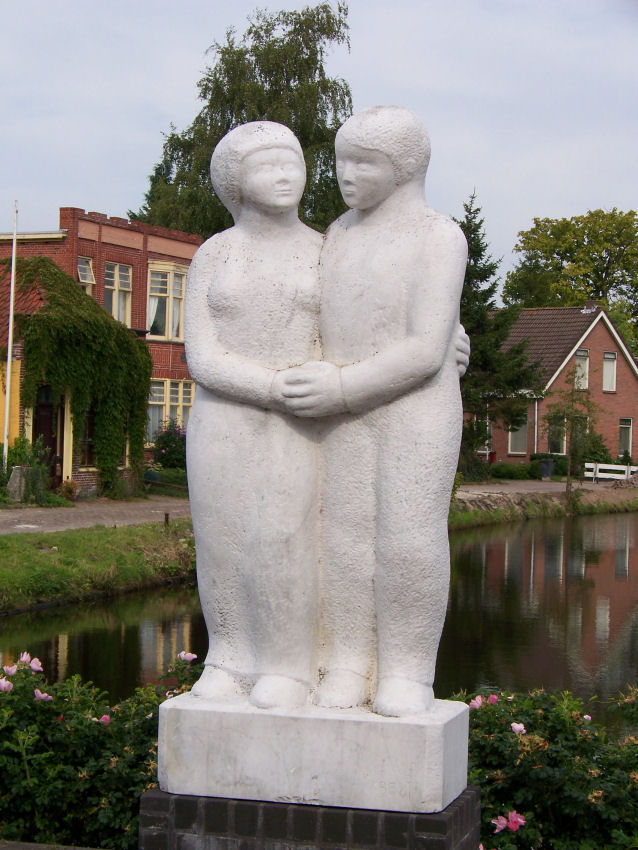
Statue in Martenshoek

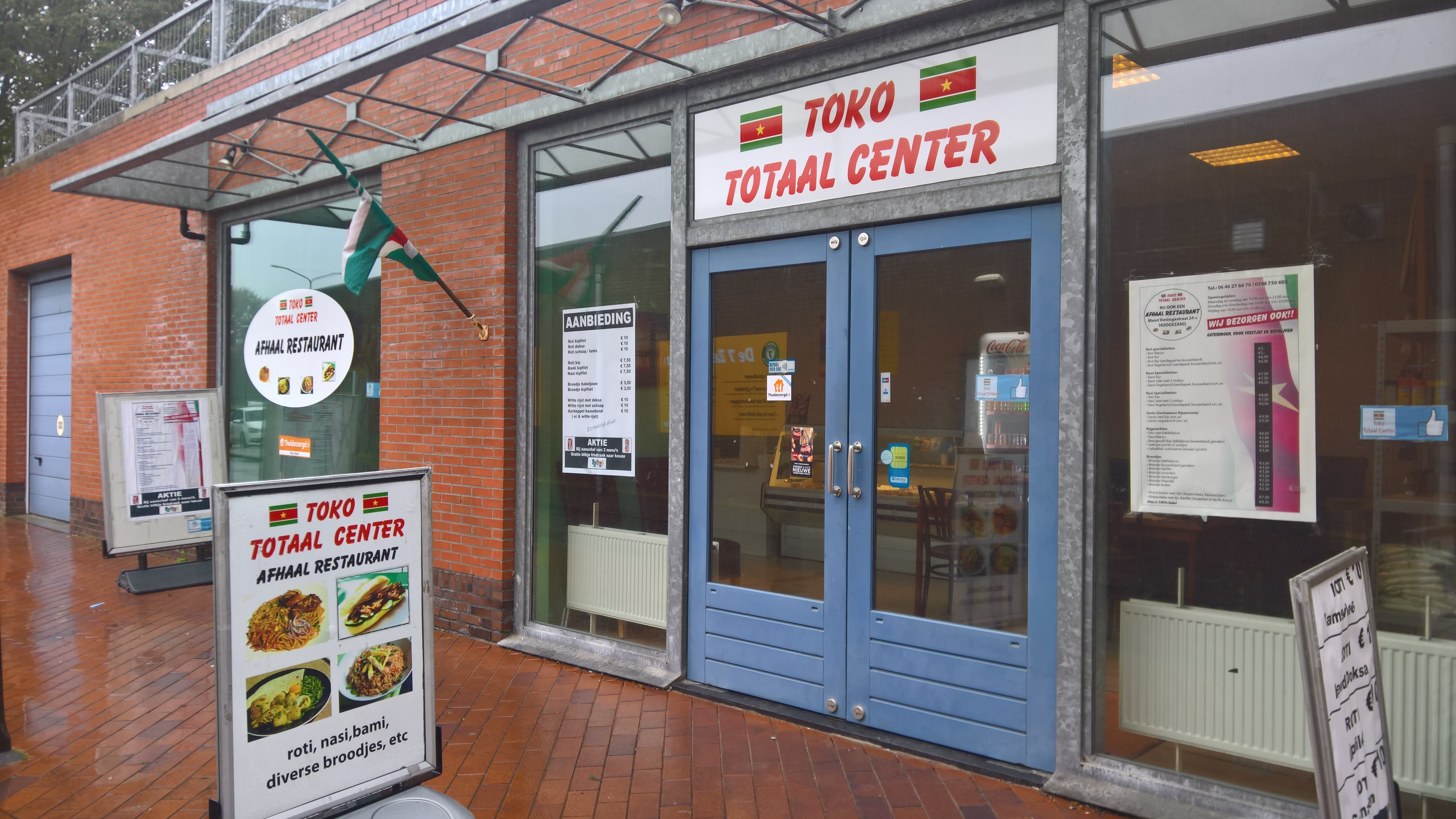
Surinamese take away

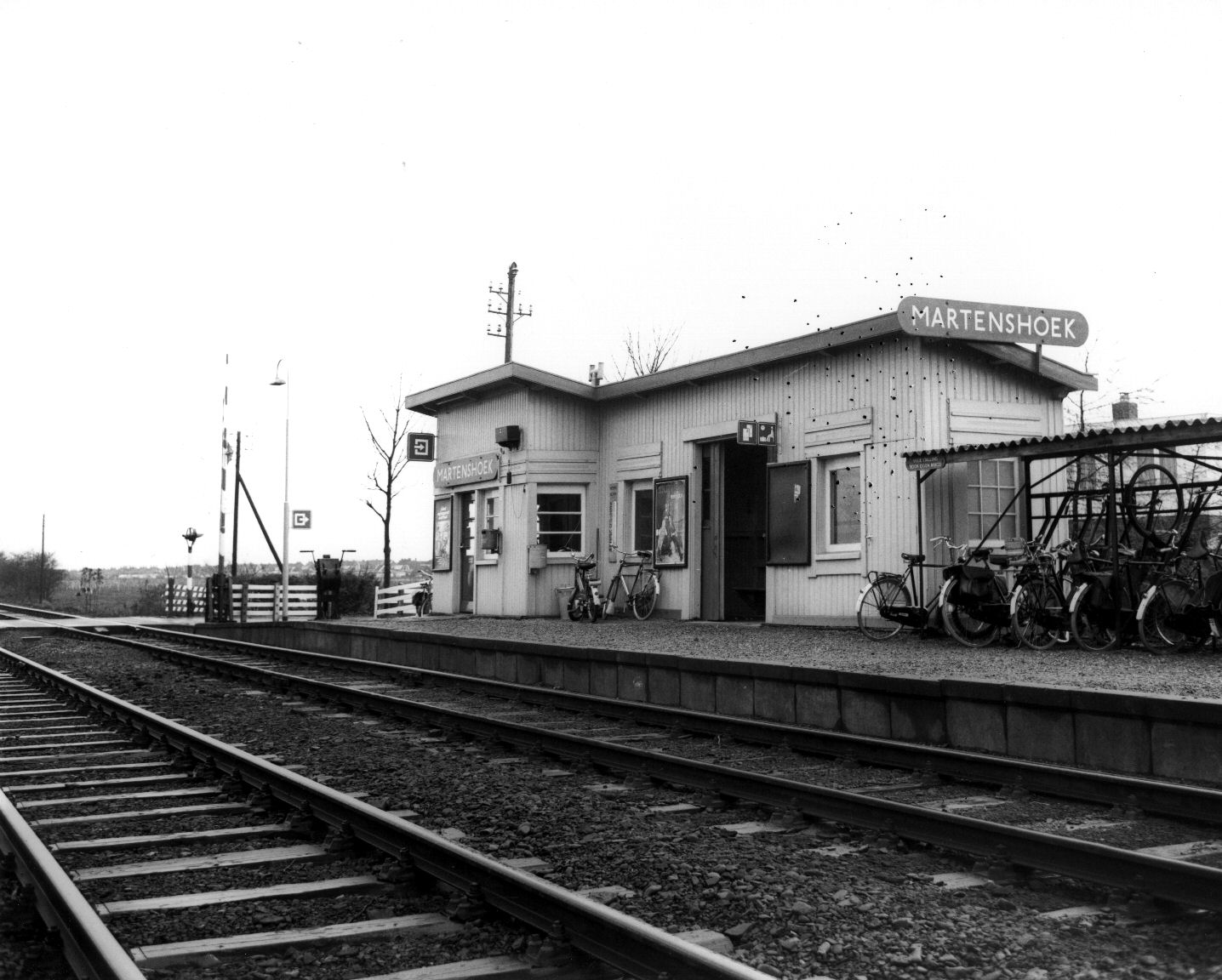
Railway station Martenshoek on the Harlingen–Nieuweschans railway
