= Sappemeer =

- Town
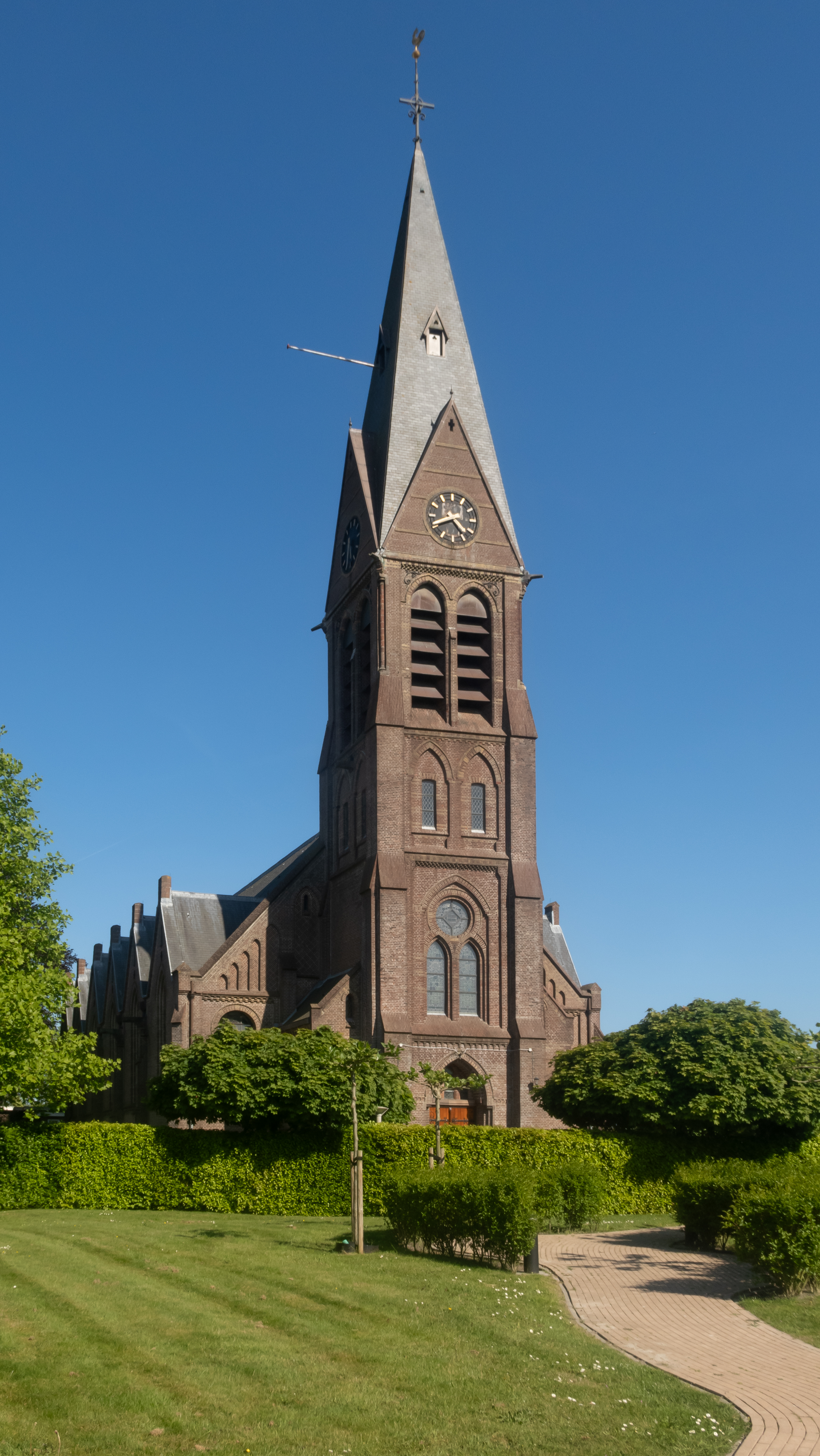
- Roman Catholic Church in 2012

- Flag Coat of arms

- Location of Sappemeer in the province of Groningen Sappemeer (Netherlands)
- Coordinates: 53°9′48″N 6°46′36″E
- Country: Netherlands
- Province: Groningen
- Municipality: Midden-Groningen

Area
  - Total: 13.31 km^{2} (5.14 sq mi)
- Elevation: 1.7 m (5.6 ft)

Population (2021)
  - Total: 8,085
  - Density: 607.4/km^{2} (1,573/sq mi)
- Time zone: UTC+1 (CET)
  - Summer (DST): UTC+2 (CEST)
- Postal code: 9611
- Dialing code: 0598
- Major roads: A7

Sappemeer (Dutch pronunciation: [ˌsɑpəˈmeːr]) is a town in the Dutch province of Groningen. It is located in the municipality of Midden-Groningen to the east of Hoogezand.

Sappemeer was a separate municipality until 1949, when it merged with Hoogezand. The village is the European headquarters of the Japanese Kikkoman Corporation, which began operations in 1997 and now produces over 40 million litres of soy sauce per annum at the site.

Dutch physician and feminist Aletta Jacobs was born in the village.

== Gallery ==
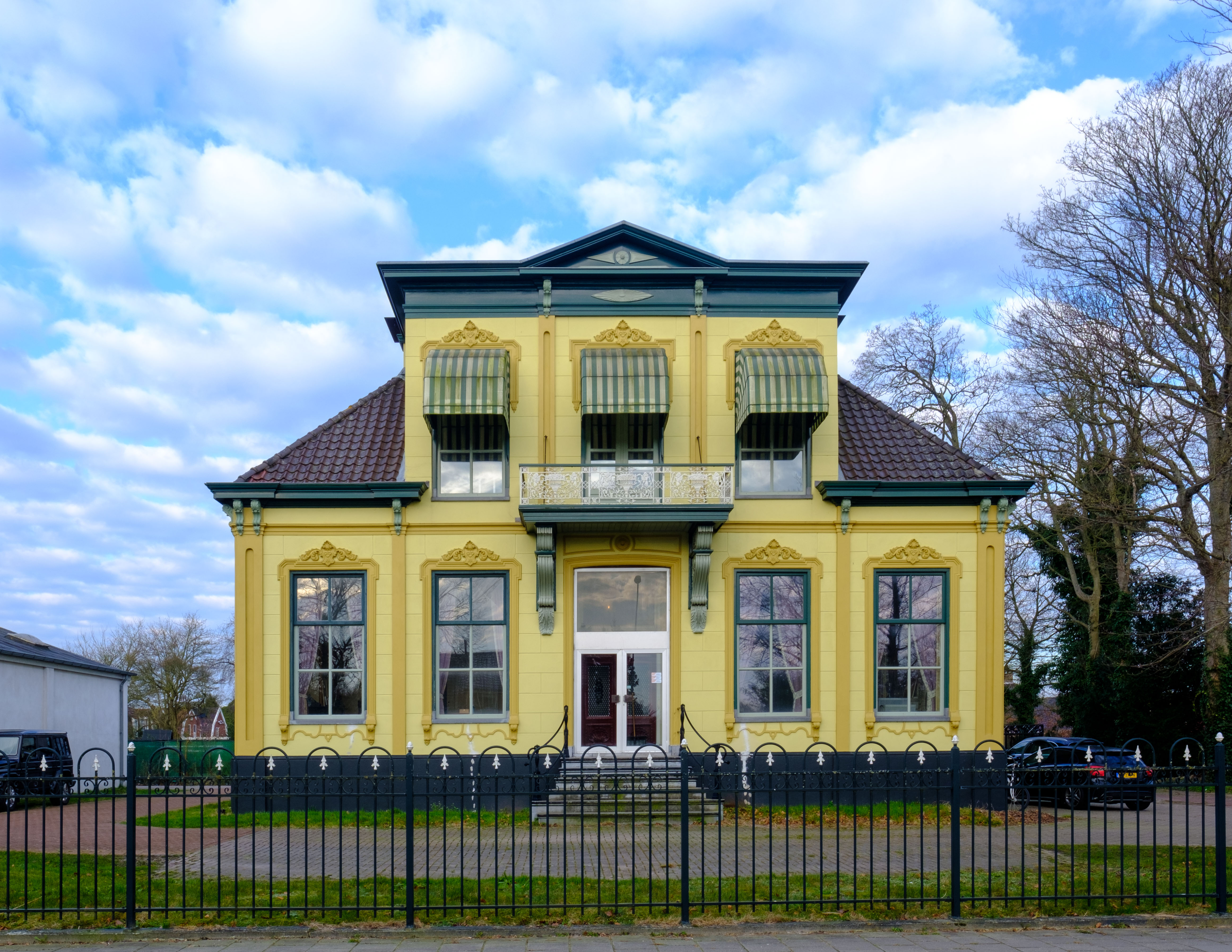
Villa in Sappemeer

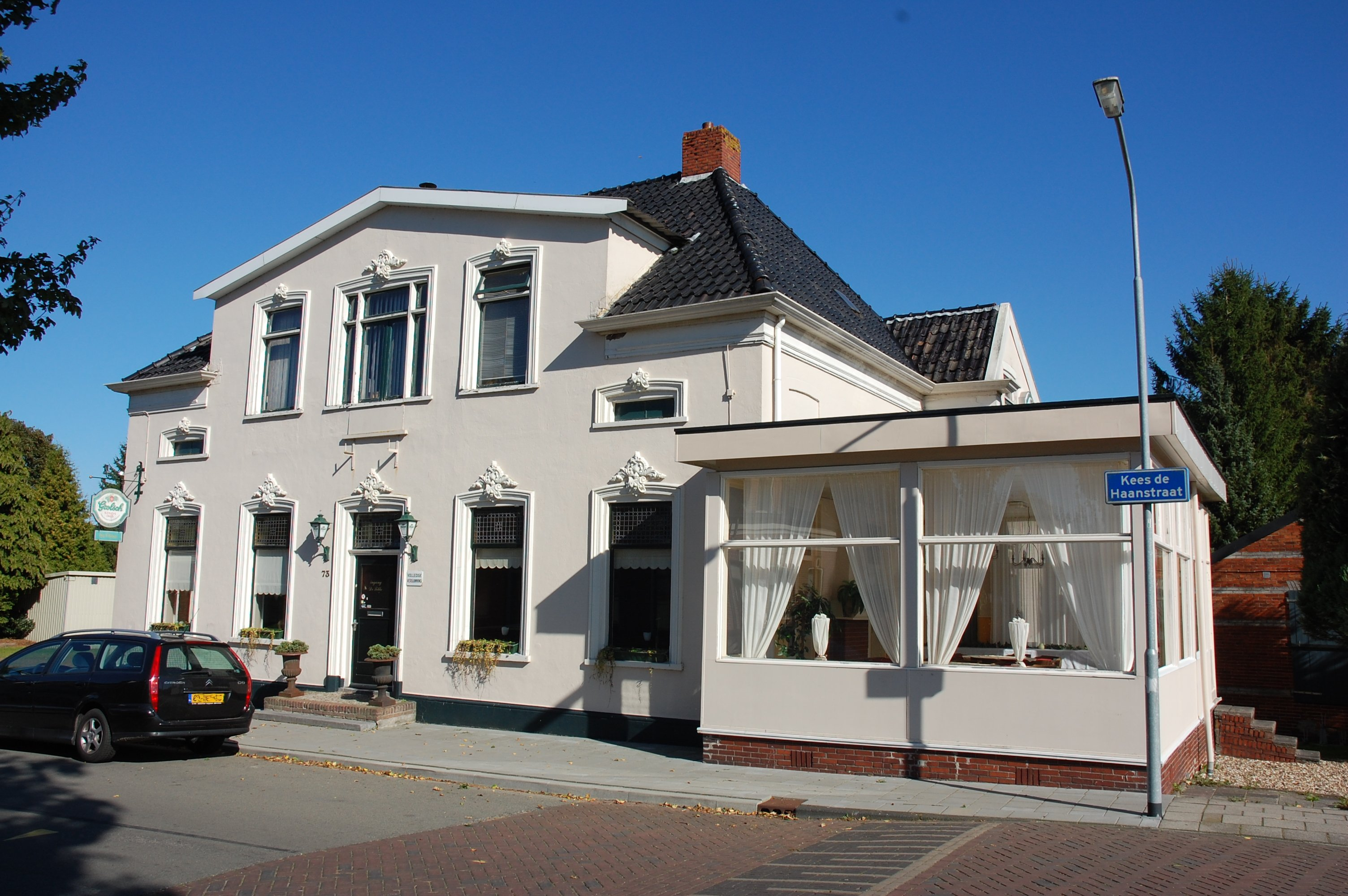
Pub in Sappemeer

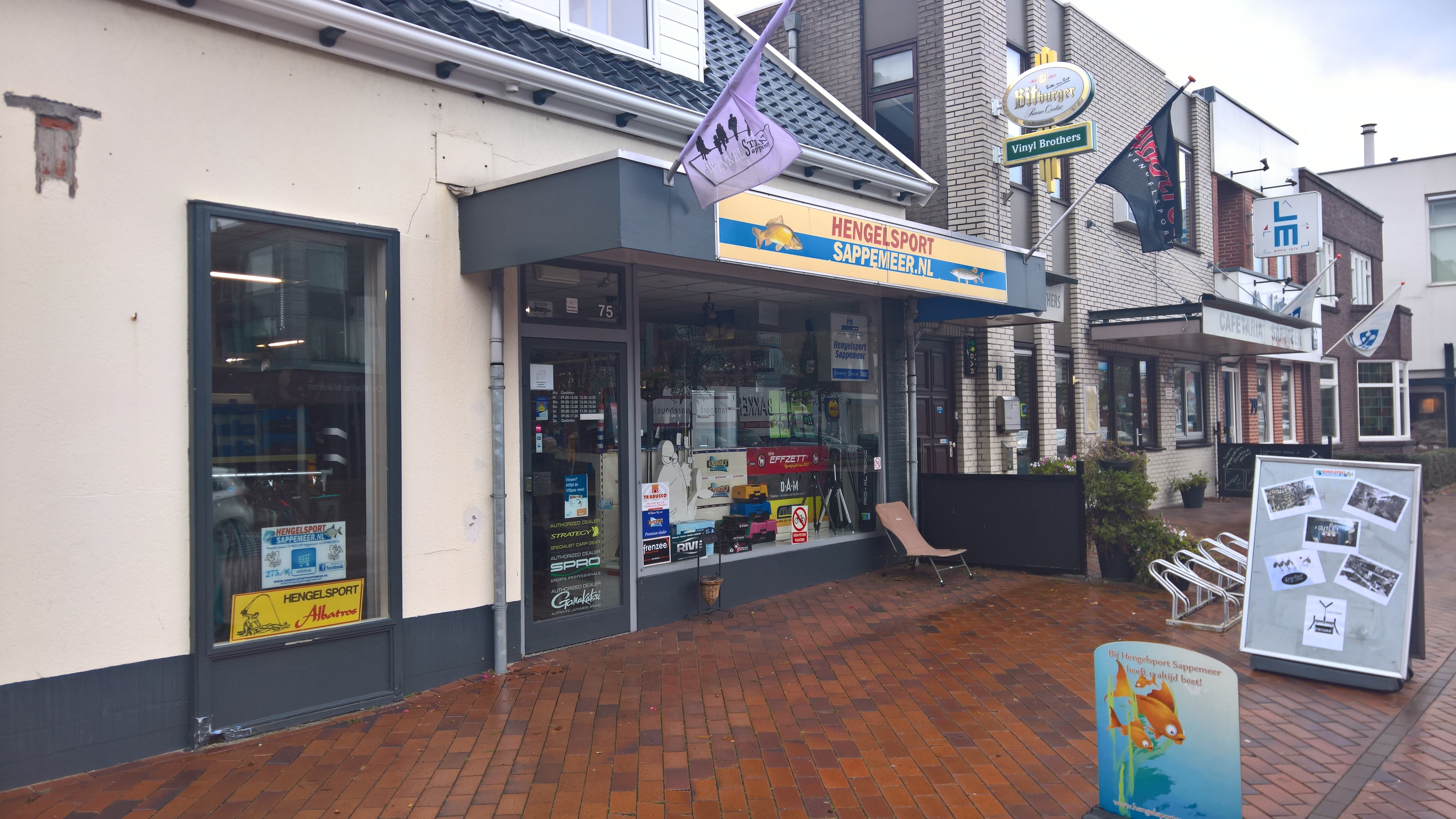
Shops in Sappemeer

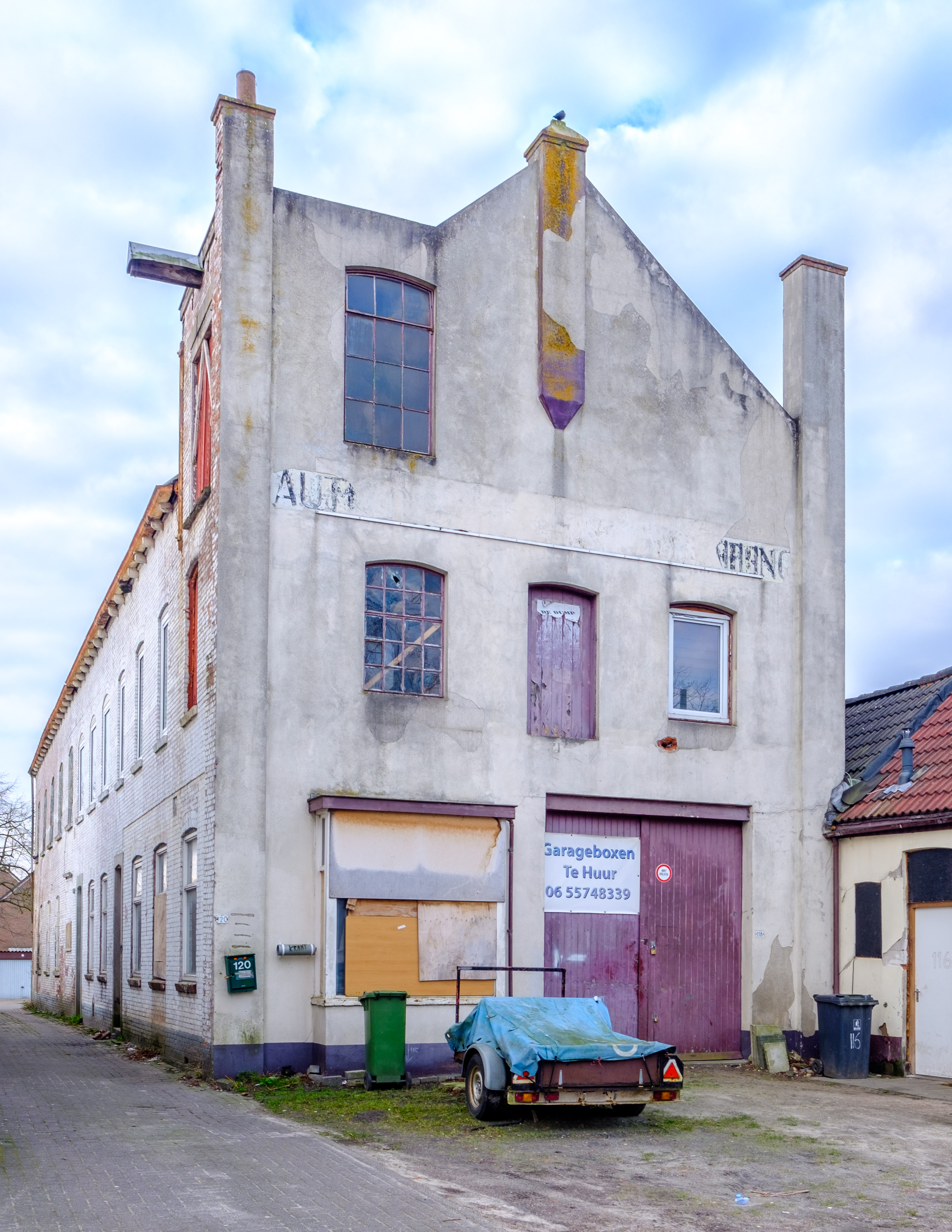
Former factory
