= NS Stations =

Dutch company

NS Stations (Dutch pronunciation: [ɛnˈɛs staːˈɕɔns]) is a Dutch company that owns and manages over 400 railway stations in the Netherlands. It is a subsidiary of national rail operator Nederlandse Spoorwegen (NS). A subsidiary company of NS Stations is NS Stations Retailbedrijf (formerly Servex; founded in 1973), which uses the brands Automaten, Brasserie Het Station, Burger King (taken over by HMSHost), Café T, Café T espresso, C'est du pain, HEMA, Kiosk, La Place (taken over by HMSHost), mr. Pizza, Pizza Hut, Restauratie, Rituals, Smullers, Swirl's, and Wizzl, and owns Stationsfoodstore, which is an Albert Heijn franchise operating about 22 "AH to go" convenience stores on stations. Wizzl also sells train tickets. They are typically at small stations which have no separate ticket window or counter; an exception is Rotterdam, with a Wizzl at the back side of the station, while separate ticket windows are at the front side only.

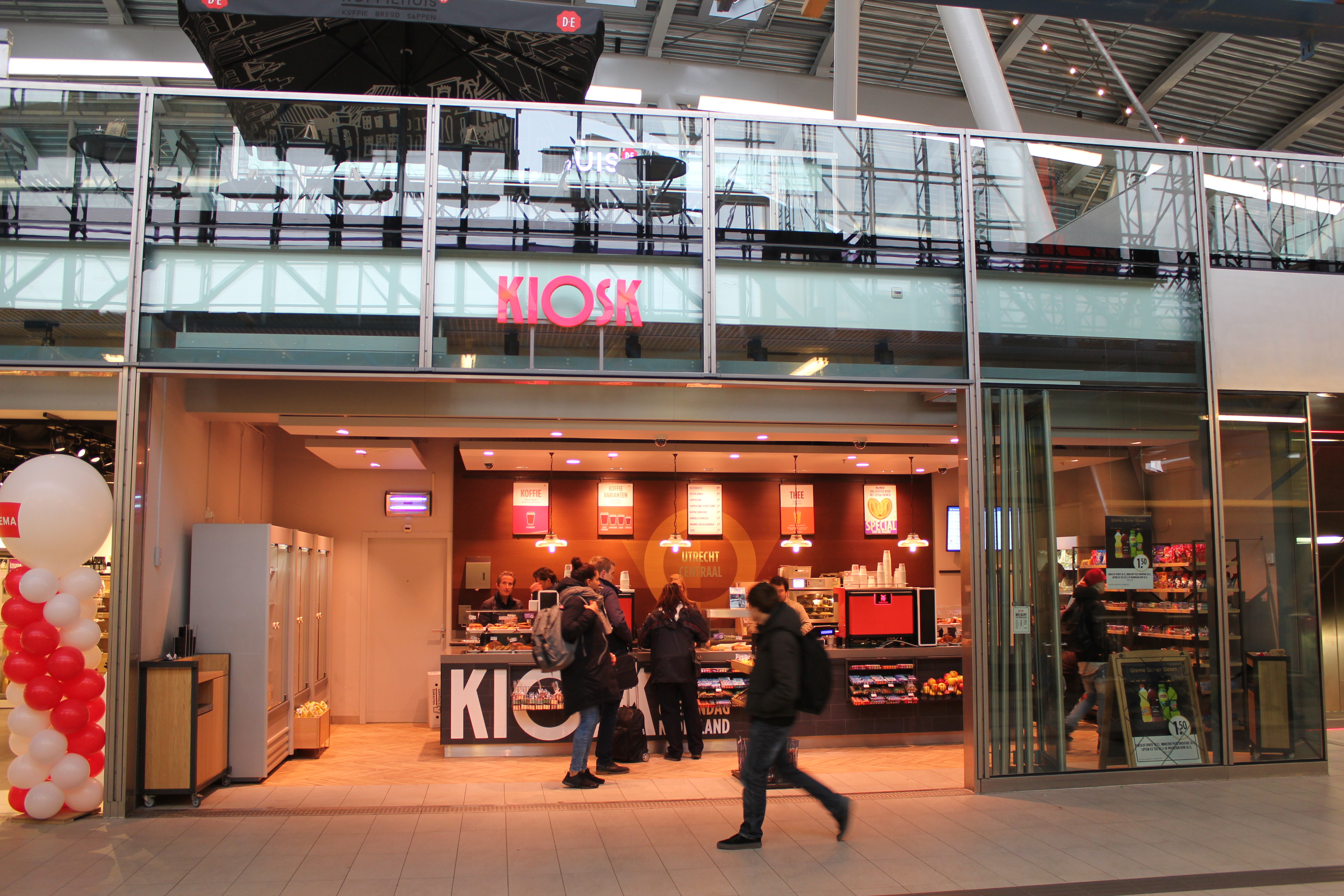
A Kiosk convenience store at Utrecht Centraal railway station

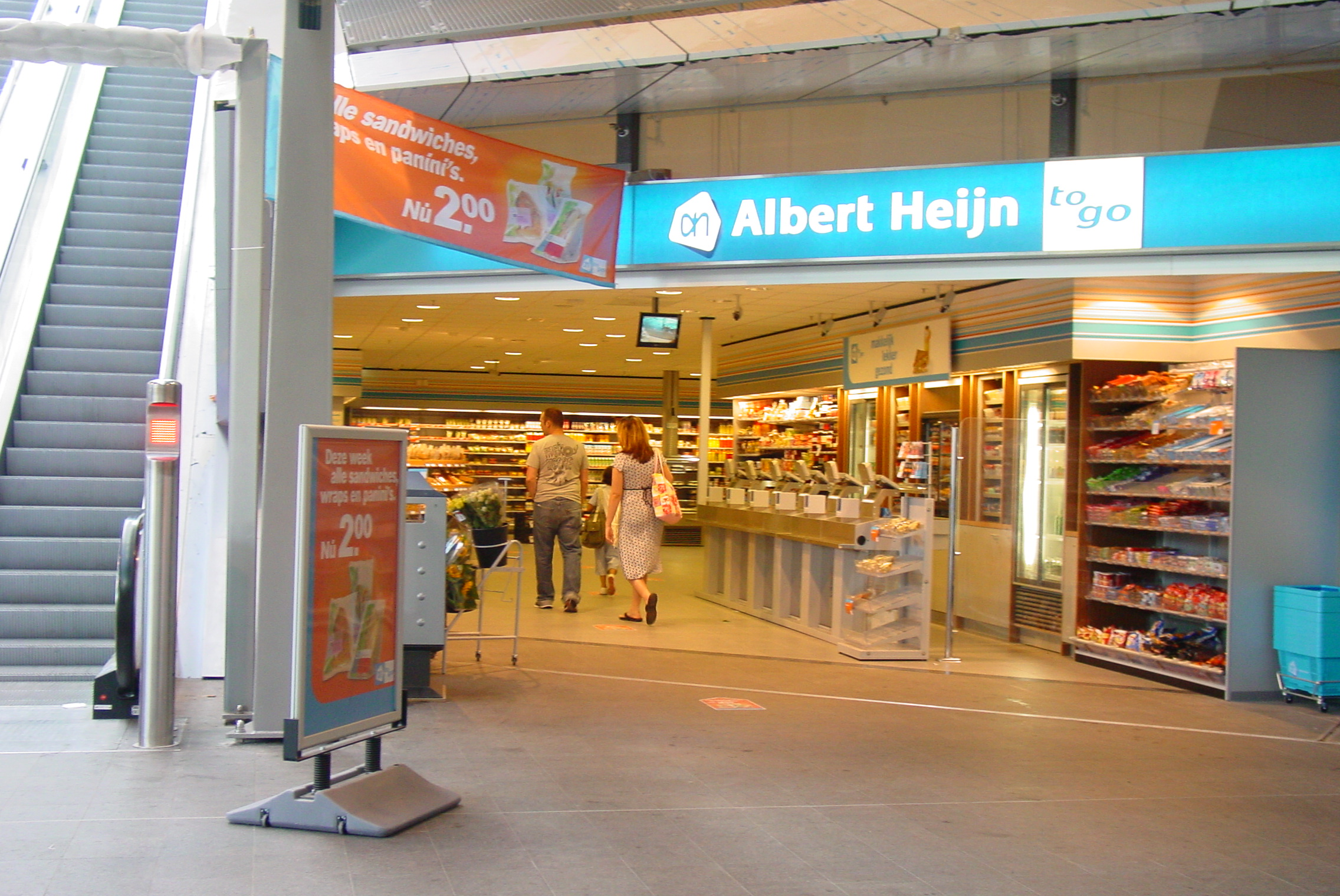
An "AH to go" convenience store at Amsterdam Bijlmer ArenA station

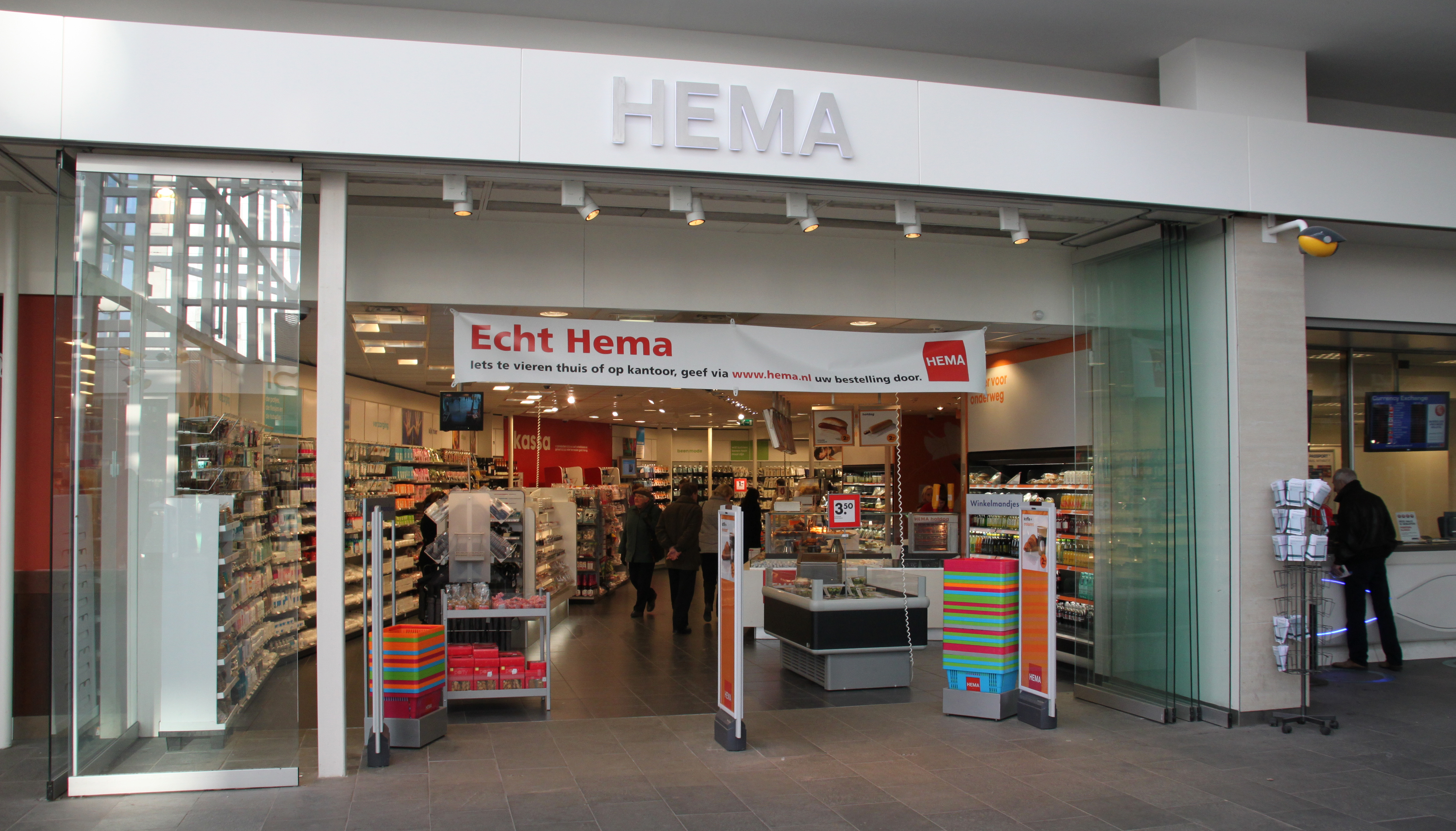
A HEMA store at Leiden Centraal railway station

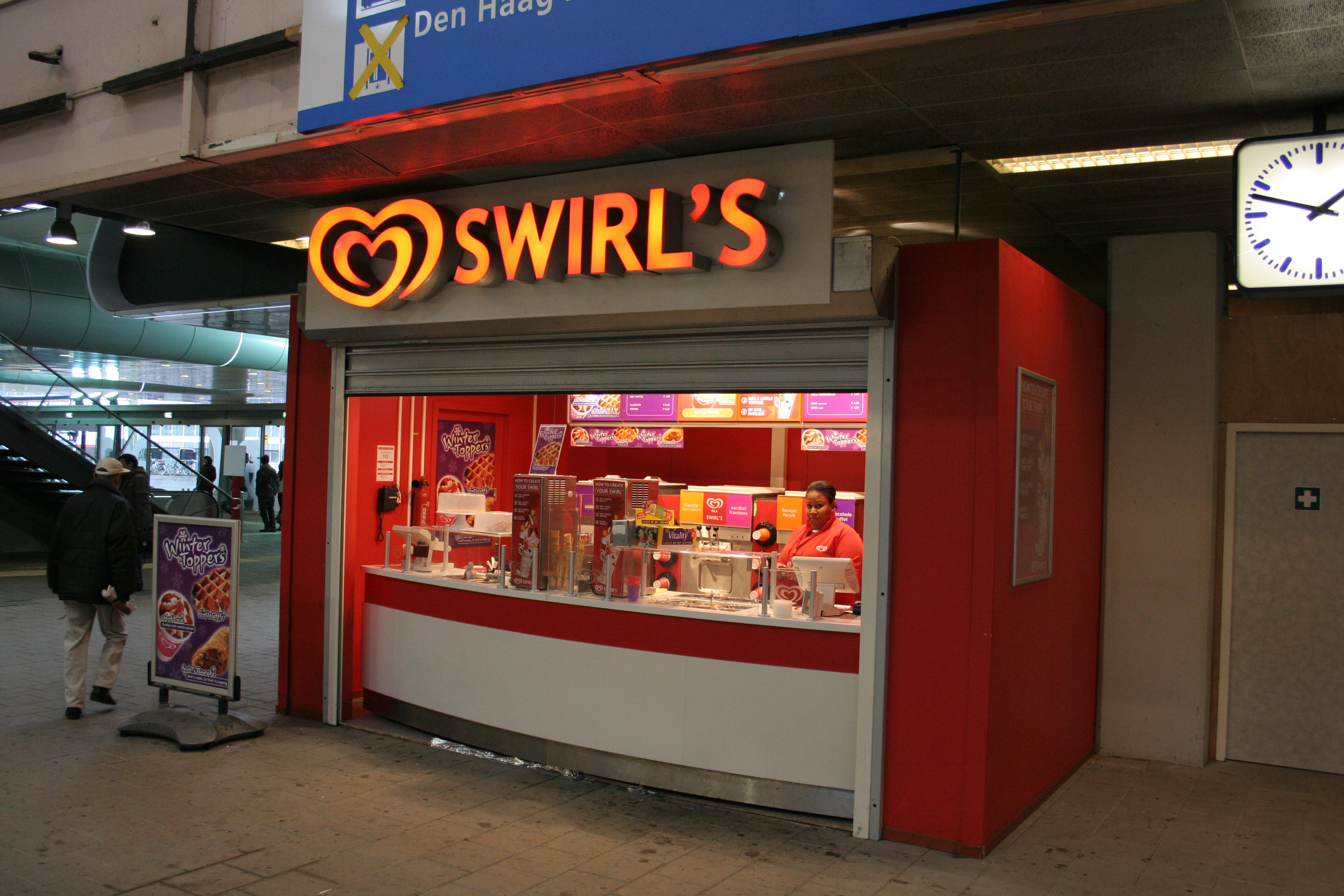
A Swirl's ice cream parlour at Den Haag Centraal railway station
